= 19th (Service) Battalion, Royal Welsh Fusiliers =

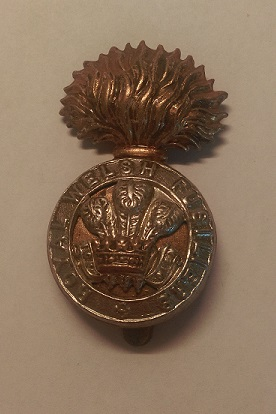
- Cap badge of the Royal Welsh Fusiliers
- Active: 1 February 1915–6 February 1918
- Allegiance: United Kingdom
- Branch: New Army
- Type: Bantam battalion
- Role: Infantry
- Size: One Battalion
- Part of: 40th Division
- Garrison/HQ: Deganwy
- Nickname: North Wales Bantams
- Patron: Welsh National Executive Committee
- Engagements: German retreat to the Hindenburg Line; Battle of Bourlon Wood

Commanders
- Notable commanders: Lt-Col James F. Plunkett, DSO**, MC, DCM

The North Wales Bantams, later the 19th (Service) Battalion, Royal Welsh Fusiliers was a Welsh Bantam battalion recruited in World War I as part of 'Kitchener's Army' from men who were below the normal minimum height required by the British Army. It formed part of the Welsh Bantam Brigade, later 119th Brigade, and served on the Western Front. It saw a good deal of action along the Hindenburg Line and at Bourlon Wood before being broken up early in 1918 to provide reinforcements to other units.

== Recruitment ==
Alfred Leete's recruitment poster for Kitchener's Army.

On 6 August 1914, less than 48 hours after Britain's declaration of war, Parliament sanctioned an increase of 500,000 men for the Regular British Army, and the newly appointed Secretary of State for War, Earl Kitchener of Khartoum issued his famous call to arms: 'Your King and Country Need You', urging the first 100,000 volunteers to come forward. This group of six divisions with supporting arms became known as Kitchener's First New Army, or 'K1'. K2, K3 and K4 followed shortly afterwards. However, these were soon joined by groups of men from particular localities or backgrounds who wished to serve together. Starting in London and Liverpool, the phenomenon of 'Pals battalions' quickly spread across the country, as local recruiting committees offered complete units to the War Office (WO), which constituted the Fifth New Army (K5). One such organisation was the 'Welsh National Executive Committee' (WNEC), which on 10 October 1914 was authorised to form a complete Welsh Army Corps of two divisions.

Meanwhile, a large number of otherwise medically fit volunteers were being turned away because they did not meet the minimum height requirement of the prewar Regular Army, of 5 feet 3 inches (160 cm). Alfred Bigland, the Member of Parliament for Birkenhead, persuaded Kitchener that this pool of potential manpower should be tapped, and he was given authority to raise a battalion of 'Bantams' (named after the small but pugnacious fighting cock). Three Bantam battalions were quickly raised at Birkenhead for the Cheshire Regiment, many of them coal miners who had travelled long distances to enlist, including from Wales, and the scheme spread to other areas. The WO authorised each military district to recruit a battalion, attached to whichever regimental depot had sufficient capacity.

The WNEC accordingly began recruiting Bantams. On 1 February 1915 it gained approval for a single Bantam company to be raised at Deganwy in North Wales, where volunteering had been slow among the Welsh-speaking nonconformist communities. Recruitment was steady but unspectacular: on 15 February the unit's strength was 1 officer and 30 other ranks (ORs), rising to 98 ORs a week later. However, by the end of March it consisted of 442 all ranks and had been expanded to a full battalion of the local regiment, the Royal Welsh Fusiliers (Note: Although the regiment preferred the spelling 'Welch', this was not officially accepted until 1921.) (RWF) as its 19th (Service) Battalion. In April the local press reported that North Wales landowner Colonel Owen Lloyd Jones Evans of Broomhall, Chwilog, was to be appointed its commanding officer. He had been commissioned into the local militia regiment, the Royal Carnarvon Rifles (later 4th (Royal Carnarvon Militia) Battalion, RWF) in 1877 and had risen to command it in 1899 before retiring with the honorary rank of colonel. He began actively recruiting for the battalion, which numbered 783 by 25 April, but it was not until a month later that he was officially gazetted as Temporary Lieutenant-Colonel in command of the battalion, backdated to 27 April. Recruitment continued and by 6 September it numbered 1145 all ranks.

However, the battalion had to reject many physically unfit or under-age recruits, which were a problem for all bantam units after the initial volunteer rush of fit miners and other manual workers had waned. The Royal Welsh Fusiliers was nicknamed the 'Birmingham Fusiliers' because of the number of men it normally recruited from the English Midlands, and a modern analysis of the 19th Battalion's make-up shows that only around 40 per cent of the men came from Wales; large numbers of the bantams came from Lancashire, Staffordshire, and other English counties. However, the officers of 19th RWF were predominantly Welsh. All Kitchener units suffered shortages of uniforms, kit and weapons in their early days. Until khaki cloth could be supplied, most of the men recruited by the WNEC were clothed in the grey Welsh cloth known as Brethyn Llwyd. However, even when khaki was available, all the bantam units had trouble obtaining uniforms and boots in smaller sizes. Each battalion raised by the WNEC received a hundred Lee–Metford rifles of Boer War vintage for training.

== Training ==
In August 1915 19th RWF left Deganwy for Prees Heath Camp, where it joined the newly-formed Welsh Bantam Brigade, the other units being the 12th (S) Bn, South Wales Borderers (SWB), and the 17th and 18th (S) Bns Welsh Regiment (WR).

The WNEC had failed in its attempt to raise two complete divisions; 38th (Welsh) Division was completed, but the second was not, and the Welsh Bantam Bde was instead assigned to 40th Division, which was intended to be a Bantam division. In September 1915 the brigade moved to Aldershot and became 119th Brigade of the division. Colonel Evans left the battalion on 12 November and later commanded 22nd (Reserve) Battalion, RWF. He was replaced in command of 19th RWF by the younger Lt-Col Bryan Jones who already had seen service on the Western Front with the Leinster Regiment. 119th Brigade moved into the training area at Blackdown Camp in December. Although 40th Division had been intended to be a second Bantam division (after 35th Division), the supply of recruits was insufficient and the other two brigades were hybrids, with just two Bantam battalions each. Worse, many of the men enlisted by these battalions were not simply undersized but actually unfit for service. 120th and 121st Brigades had to be completely reorganised with additional battalions of normal height men, holding up the division's training for several months. Once this reorganisation was completed in late February 1916 its training was intensified. In the spring there was a rumour that it would be deployed to Ireland to help suppress the Easter Rising, but this did not happen. Instead in mid-May it was warned to prepare to move to the Western Front. Men who were unfit or required for munitions work were transferred out and replaced by men from the Local Reserve battalions. Mobilisation was completed between 27 and 31 May and the battalions went by train to Southampton Docks for embarkation. 19th RWF landed at Le Havre in France on 2 June. By 9 June the division had completed its concentration in the Lillers area near Béthune.

== Service ==
On 10 June the battalion went up to the front line in the Calonne sector for a four-day introduction to trench warfare with 3rd Bde in 1st Division. Battalion HQ (BHQ), A and B Companies were attached to 2nd Royal Munster Fusiliers, C and D Companies to 1st Gloucestershire Regiment. On 18 June the battalion returned for another three-day tour with the other battalions of 3rd Bde, BHQ, C and D Companies with 2nd WR, A and B Companies with 1st SWB. During these tours the battalion suffered its first few casualties to shell and small arms fire. 40th Division then took over the Calonne sector from 1st Division on 3 July. Battalions rotated between the front line, support and reserve trenches, providing working parties for trench repairs and to assist the Royal Engineers (REs) (particularly 255th Tunnelling Company) when not in the front line. When in the line 19th RWF operated under the codename 'Warrior'. Although both armies were concentrating on the Somme Offensive further south, units in the Calonne sector still saw casualties mount up during the summer: enemy snipers and trench mortars were active. At the end of August 19th RWF received a draft of 80 reinforcements, mostly from 2nd RWF and the Welsh Horse Yeomanry as the supply of bantam reinforcements had dried up (the bantam concept died out by the end of 1916). The brigade carried out a number of trench raids, with 19th RWF attempting a small one on the night of 30 September/1 October, which failed due to the lack of experience of those participating. The battalion had more success on 19/20 October when a party succeeded in entering the enemy trenches near 'Hart's Crater' and obtaining identification of the German unit opposite.

40th Division was relieved at the end of October and went into GHQ Reserve, with 19th RWF billeted at Petit Sains. The division then marched south to join Fourth Army, with 119th Bde Group at Bellancourt. Three weeks' training was carried out before 40th Division moved into the Somme Sector, with 19th RWF going into the line at Rancourt on 31 December. Here there was complete destruction left by the previous summer's fighting. The front line troops spent the winter among a maze of smashed and flooded trenches and dugouts, under occasional bombardments. Living in these conditions the number of sick and cases of Trench foot rose sharply. Lieutenant-Col Jones was wounded on 22 January 1917, having run into an enemy patrol while visiting some isolated posts, and Major J.H.R. Downes-Powell took command of the battalion.

=== Hindenburg Line ===
Training for the battalions was stepped up during the winter, with emphasis on Lewis guns and the new 'fighting platoon' tactics. Trench-raiding by both sides resumed when the weather improved in March 1917 - 40th Division was ordered to penetrate into the German lines at least once a week. On 17 March 12th SWB raided the enemy line under cover of bad weather, and reported it only lightly held. That day the Germans had begun withdrawing from in front of 40th Division. This was part of a large-scale retreat to the prepared positions of the Hindenburg Line (Operation Alberich). The division immediately began cautiously following up, while 19th RWF remained in camp at Suzanne and Curlu, providing working parties for road repair and quarrying. 40th Division was leapfrogged in the advance on 24 March and then the whole division was set to repairing the roads and railways that had been destroyed by the retreating enemy, 19th RWF working on roads near Bouchavesnes. The commander of 119th Bde, Brigadier-General Frank Crozier found that his little Welsh miners excelled at this work. Once communications had been restored, XV Corps, to which 40th Division belonged, closed up to the Hindenburg Line during the first three weeks of April. German resistance stiffened among the fortified villages they held as outworks to their main line.

On 20 April 40th Division was ordered to take part in an attack next morning to seize one of these outworks, the village of Gonnelieu. Other than the roads being cratered, this open countryside was untouched by war and covered by long grass. Of the two brigades in the divisional front, 119th would deal with 'Fifteen Ravine' while 120th would take the ground to its left. The 'ravine' was actually a gully no more than 10 feet (3.0 m) deep. 19th RWF (right) and 12th SWB (left) led 119th Bde, followed by 18th WR in support and 17th WR in reserve. 19th RWF was deployed with A (right) and D (left) Companies in front in the new 'fighting platoon' formation and B and D respectively in support. Fifteen minutes before Zero the attackers formed up in the dark on tapes laid out well ahead of their own positions. The covering barrage opened at 04.15 and the two leading battalions followed the Creeping barrage when it moved off at 04.20, pressing forward through a German counter-barrage. 19th RWF was on all its objectives on the spur to the right of Fifteen Ravine by 05.15 and the support companies began consolidating the position while covering parties and patrols were sent out. Casualties had been negligible, but A Company began to suffer heavily during consolidation. At 15.15 2nd Rifle Brigade of the neighbouring 8th Division requested assistance in taking Gonnelieu, and A company raided a troublesome German strongpoint while the Lewis gunners and snipers suppressed the German machine guns. At the same time B Company deployed to bring covering fire to bear on the eastern part of Gonnelieu. That night 19th RWF went back into support as 17th and 18th WR took over the new line. The attackers received congratulations from Corps and Army HQs for an operation carried out with steadiness and precision. The battalion's total casualties had been 2 officers and 50 ORs killed or wounded.

19th RWF and 12th SWB were in brigade support and reserve respectively when 40th Division attacked Villers-Plouich on 24 April; together they amounted to no more than a single weak battalion. At one point 119th Bde was warned to wheel to help 120th Bde's stalled attack on Beaucamps, with 19th RWF and 12th SWB warned to move east of Villers-Plouich but the village was successfully captured and this order was cancelled. 19th RWF ended the day in close support in Fifteen Ravine. The line of low spurs now held by 119th Bde was later dubbed 'Welsh Ridge' by the BEF. Similarly, when 19th RWF settled in front of La Vacquerie it called the position 'Fusilier Ridge'.

La Vacquerie was the last village in the area still held by the Germans was, and 40th Division took part in an operation against it on the night of 4/5 May. 119th Brigade had the task of raiding the village itself, with 12th SWB on the right and 17th WR on the left, behind whom 200 'moppers-up' of 19th RWF armed with bombs and cudgels and the Sappers of 224th Field Company, Royal Engineers, would destroy all the dugouts and cellars. The attackers formed up in No man's land and when the barrage fell at 23.00 they went forward. The raiders were held up by barbed wire and by artillery and mortar fire. As a result, the moppers-up and Sappers got mixed up in the fighting, but they carried out several demolitions before the recall signal was made at 01.00, the moppers-up helping to evacuate the wounded.

=== Summer 1917 ===
Acting Lt-Col Downes-Powell was evacuated to hospital on 8 May and was temporarily replaced by Acting Maj George Morgan until Maj Arthur White arrived from 7th King's Own Yorkshire Light Infantry to take over on 14 May. He in turn was replaced on 2 June when Lt-Col Bryan Jones returned to the command. However, Brig-Gen Crozier appears to have engineered the removal of Lt-Col Jones, who was replaced by one of Crozier's favoured officers, Lt-Col James F. Plunkett, on 6 August. 'Freddie' Plunkett had joined the Regular Army as a band boy in the early 1890s, and by 1914 was a Regimental Sergeant-Major. Unsuccessfully recommended for a Victoria Cross (VC) during the Retreat from Mons, he was commissioned as an officer in 1915 and by 1917 was a major, who had temporarily commanded other battalions in the division. (After his removal from 19th RWF, Lt-Col Bryan Jones was later killed in action while commanding a battalion of the Royal Irish Rifles.)

The division continued holding the Villers-Plouich sector during the summer, 19th RWF usually alternating with 12th SWB between the front, support and reserve positions. 40th Division maintained offensive patrols and raids, in which 119th Bde was notably successful. 19th RWF planned a raid on 'Barrier Trench' for the night of 12/13 August in which the inner belt of wire protecting the German line would be breached using a Bangalore torpedo. The 33 raiders under Capt Morgan cut through the outer wire but could not get the torpedo in place before Zero, so although the torpedo was fired the raid was called off. The following evening reconnaissance showed that the Germans had repaired the damage to the inner wire, but not the gap in the outer wire. Morgan's raiders set out with a second torpedo for another attempt, but found the enemy alertly lining their parapet so the torpedo could not be positioned. However, they found two other gaps in the inner wire, so after asking for the covering artillery barrage to be postponed and then reorganised as 5 minutes of intensive fire on the trench, the attackers went in, inflicting heavy casualties, destroying dugouts and taking prisoners. On 28/29 August another party with some attached sappers made a silent raid without artillery support, blew a gap in the wire and again caused casualties and damage before coming back with a prisoner. A much larger raid (100 fusiliers and 6 sappers) went out on 13/14 September, cutting and blowing gaps in the first two belts of wire but being defeated by an unexpected third belt. Except in the last case the casualties were light, and a number of gallantry medals were awarded. 19th RWF continued patrolling and attacking the wire barriers. When not in the front line the battalions spent much of their time digging and improving trenches and roads. They remained under strength, the 'trench strength' of 19th RWF on 22 August being only 434 all ranks.

=== Bourlon Wood ===
After six months' continuous service in the line, 40th Division was relieved at the beginning of October and went to the Fosseux area for rest. It then moved to the wooded area round Lucheux to begin training for the forthcoming Battle of Cambrai, with particular emphasis on fighting in woods, ready for a planned operation in La Garrene wood, though it was applied in Bourlon Wood. The battle began with a massed tank attack on 20 November that broke through the Hindenburg Line, and the division moved up on 22 November as far as 'Danger Corner' with orders to attack Bourlon Wood next morning. The capture of the wood by 40th and 51st (Highland) Divisions would provide a defensive flank to allow Third Army to continue developing the successes of the first two days. 40th Division took over the front at Anneux during the night, but the men were tired by the difficult approach march along congested routes. The division deployed with119th Bde on the right to go through Bourlon Wood itself while 121st Bde was to attack up the left of the wood to Bourlon village. 119th Brigade had 19th RWF on its right and 12th SWB on the left, each battalion attacking on a two-company front. The brigade was supposed to be supported by 16 tanks of G battalion, Tank Corps, but traffic jams meant that G Battalion's tanks had been unable to resupply overnight, and they did not move up until 12.00. (However, four tanks of D Battalion were switched across from 121st Bde and assisted 12th SWB.) The attacking infantry were preceded by an intensive barrage of high explosive and shrapnel shells that fell on the edge of the wood at 10.30 and then lifted forwards 200 yards (180 m) every 10 minutes. The barrage was supposed to include smoke shells, but these were also held up on the congested roads and did not arrive in time, though the morning mist gave some cover to the attackers.

19th RWF followed the barrage into the wood, entering it at about 10.45. A few enemy machine guns opened fire but they did not check the advance. About 100 yards (91 m) into the thick undergrowth the battalion paused and realigned before moving on at about 11.00, sending back batches of prisoners. The fusiliers followed their training by surrounding machine gun posts before going in with the bayonet. About 11.40 the battalion reached its first objective, a sunken road in the middle of the wood. Here it reorganised once more and Advanced Battalion HQ moved up close behind. Some of G Battalion's tanks had now come up, but they could achieve little in the dense woods. By 12.20 19th RWF had reached the north edge of the wood and Lt-Col Plunkett went forward to assess the situation. He collected about 60 men and organised these into a line of outposts at the wood's edge, extending it round the east side as more men came up, including the right half of the 17th WR from support. Parties of the enemy were retreating away from the wood to the north-east. Contact was finally made with 12th SWB to the left, which had experienced a tougher advance. Meanwhile, 51st (H) Division's attack to the right had failed, and 121st Bde's advance on the left of 12th SWB was meeting heavy resistance; Divisional HQ decided not to push 119th Bde further forward until its flanks were secure, but to consolidate a good defensive line inside the wood, while the artillery placed a standing barrage along the wood's edge. About 15.10 a powerful German counter-attack threatened to envelop 12th SWB, who held on until 18th WR came up from brigade reserve to help, one of its companies moving behind 19th RWF as a reserve. Lieutenant-Col Benzie of 12th SWB was given command of the whole forward area, with Lt-Col Plunkett commanding 119th Bde's front line as a composite battalion. He moved his HQ to a red brick chalet in the middle of the wood, although German guns had its range and kept it under fire. About 16.00 he was reinforced by 200 dismounted men of the 15th Hussars and in the evening two companies of 14th Argyll and Sutherland Highlanders (A&SH) arrived from 120th Bde in divisional reserve, together with eight Vickers gun teams from 244th Machine Gun Company. Plunkett used these to thicken the line, which had been suffering casualties from shell and machine gun fire, and placed the Vickers guns on the right flank. The enemy continued to shell the wood, especially with gas shells. At 23.45 they attempted to break through, but failed, and similar attempts were driven off through the night. Supplied with rations, water and ammunition that Crozier sent up into the wood, the force dug in during the night, covered by patrols. Reinforcements arrived: the rest of 14th A&SH, and 119th Bde's works company and salvage section. By morning they had established a continuous line even though both flanks were still open.

At 09.00 on 24 November the Germans launched a heavy counter-attack from the direction of Bourlon village, and another attack came in at 11.00, while the wood was constantly under shellfire, Still, 119th Bde Group continued to hold Bourlon Wood throughout the day while the rest of 40th Division fought a bitter battle for control of Bourlon village. Around 15.00 another attack forced 119th Bde's line back except at the north-east corner of the wood. Plunkett sent the various officers of 19th RWF's Battalion HQ out to take charge of different sections of his mixed line, while taking over the centre himself. Then the mixed force of Welsh battalions, Highlanders and dismounted cavalry counter-attacked at around 16.00, pushing the Germans out of the wood and back down the northern slopes, where they were caught by the British barrage; the German casualties were very heavy. A brigade of Guards Division finally came up to secure the brigade's open right flank and at midnight the survivors of 119th Bde in the wood were relieved by two companies of 11th King's Own (120th Bde) and 2nd Scots Guards, Lt-Cols Benzie and Plunkett overseeing their deployment. The brigade was formally relieved by 186th Bde of 62nd (2nd West Riding) Division next day, and could then be withdrawn to reorganise and rest while the fighting for Bourlon village continued. 19th RWF's casualties had been 8 officers and 31 ORs killed, 9 officers and 227 ORs wounded, and 1 officer and 85 ORs missing. It had captured 12 machine guns and 280 German officers and men.

Crozier recommended Plunkett for a VC after Bourlon, but once again he did not receive it; instead he was awarded an 'immediate' Distinguished Service Order (DSO) early in 1918 - since he had just received a 'periodic' DSO in the 1918 New Year Honours, this second award was as a Bar.

=== Winter 1917–18 ===
The whole of 40th Division was withdrawn at noon on 27 November and entrained at Ytres for Bienvillers near Arras. After cleaning up and undertaking some training, it took over the line in the Bullecourt sector. It occupied a captured section of the Hindenburg Line named 'Tunnel Trench' and held those positions through the winter. Despite its very weak battalions, 40th Division resumed trench raiding in December. 19th RWF carried out the most ambitious of these operation on 15 December against 'Neptune Trench'. The raiders went out in two parties, each with another platoon in support, and accompanied by demolition parties of sappers. Supporting fire was provided by 119th and 244th Machine Gun companies and 119th and 121st Trench Mortar batteries, and by the divisional artillery and medium trench mortars. This was a daylight raid with Zero set at 15.00; the whole objective was brought under intense fire for 3 minutes before zero, then the flank batteries lifted while the two parties attacked either end of the trench. The centre of the trench was bombarded for a further 12 minutes. After lifting off the target, artillery and machine guns opened up on the ruins of Fontaine-lès-Croisilles in an attempt to convince that enemy that the real attack was directed there. The raiding parties entered the trench and after a stiff bombing fight drove the small enemy parties back down their communication trenches or into their dugouts, which were then destroyed by the sappers. The captured trench was blocked at both ends and incorporated into the British position. 19th RWF's casualties had been 4 killed and 19 wounded. Operations had to be halted in January 1918 when a thaw made the communication trenches impassable: the forward positions could only be reached by going 'over the top' at night.

== Disbandment ==
By early 1918 the BEF was suffering a manpower crisis. Brigades had to be reduced from four to three battalions, and the surplus war-formed battalions were broken up to provide reinforcements for others. On 6 February 19th RWF transferred a draft of 8 officers and 150 ORs to 2nd RWF in 38th (Welsh) Division, then the remainder of the battalion left 40th Division and joined VI Corps' Reinforcement Camp. On 16 February 19th (Service) Battalion, Royal Welsh Fusiliers, was disbanded and its remaining personnel were amalgamated with those of 10th RWF from 3rd Division) and 24th/27th Northumberland Fusiliers (Tyneside Irish) from 34th Division to form 8th Entrenching Battalion in VI Corps under Lt-Col A.J.S. James of 10th RWF. Lieutenant-Col Plunkett later returned to command 13th Royal Inniskilling Fusiliers in the reconstituted 119th Bde, winning a second bar to his DSO, making him one of the most highly decorated officers of the war.

== Insignia ==
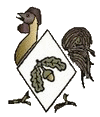

On 15 May 1915 all ranks of the service battalions were given permission to wear the RWF's famous 'Back Flash', of five overlapping black ribbons, 5 inches (13 cm) long, on the back of the service dress jacket beneath the collar.

Initially, 40th Division used a white diamond as its formation sign; later the diamond was superimposed on a bantam cock (which had already been used by the bantam 35th Division) even though only 119th Bde was composed of bantams by then. After the fighting in Bourlon Wood the division added an acorn and two oak leaves on the diamond. This final version was issued as a cloth arm badge in late 1917 or early 1918. Battalions within 119th Bde also wore coloured geometric shapes on the sleeve: a red over blue horizontal rectangle at the top of the arm in the case of 19th RWF.

== Memorials ==
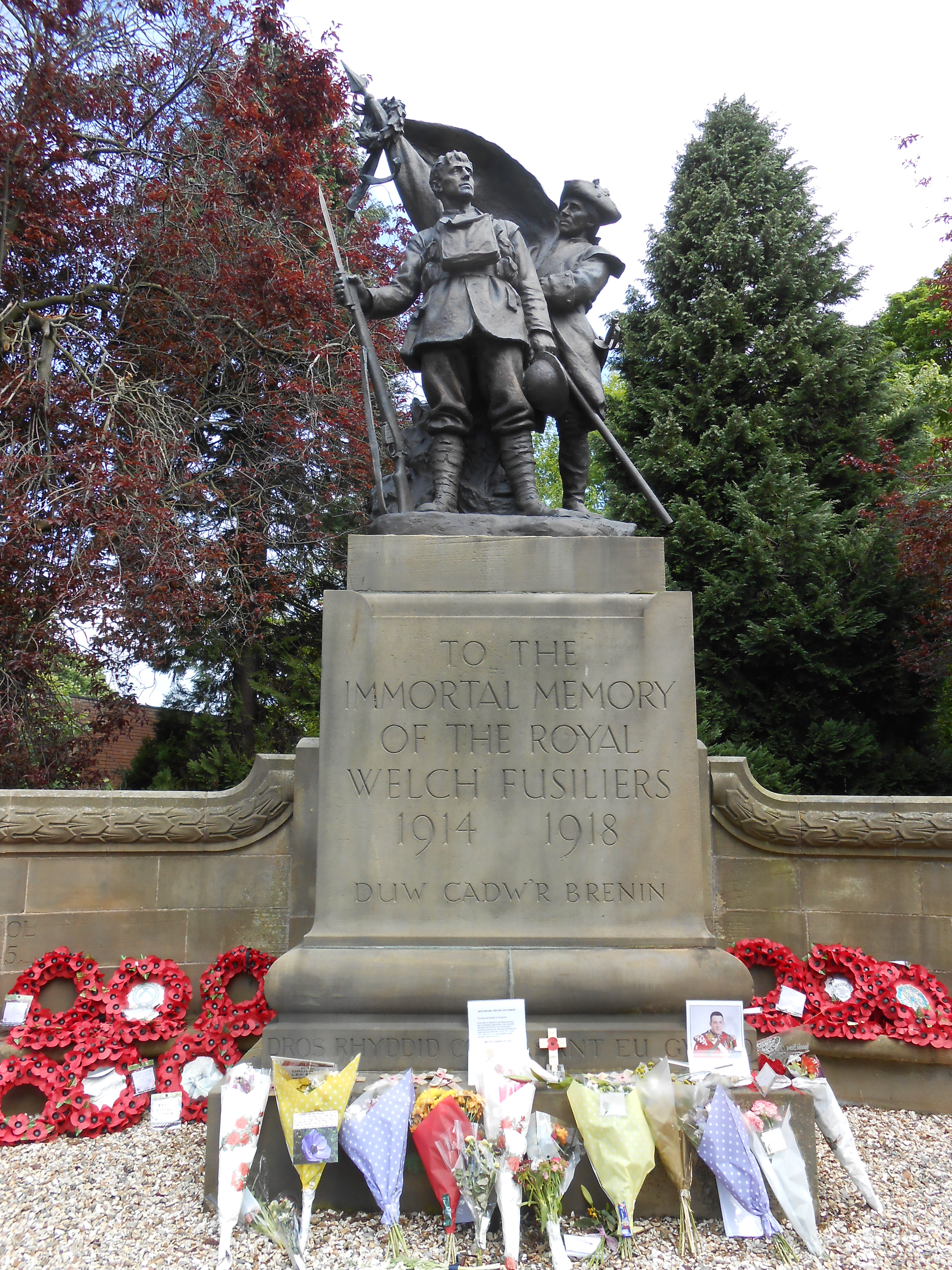
The Royal Welch Fusiliers Memorial, Wrexham.

The main regimental monument is the Royal Welch Fusiliers Memorial, Wrexham, at the regimental depot.

40th Division's memorial is an altar in Bourlon Church dedicated on 27 May 1928 to those who died in Bourlon Wood in November 1917.

== Commanders ==
The following officers commanded the battalion during its service:

- Col O.L.J. Evans, 27 April to 12 November 1915
- Lt-Col B.J.Jones, 12 November 1915 to 22 January 1917 (wounded); returned 2 June to 6 August 1917
- Lt-Col J.H.R. Downes-Powell, 22 January to 8 May 1917 (invalided)
- A/Maj G.A.H. Morgan, acting 8–14 May 1917
- Maj A.C. White, acting 14 May to 2 June 1917
- Lt-Col J.F. Plunkett, 6 August 1917 to disbandment
