= 12th (Service) Battalion, South Wales Borderers (3rd Gwent) =

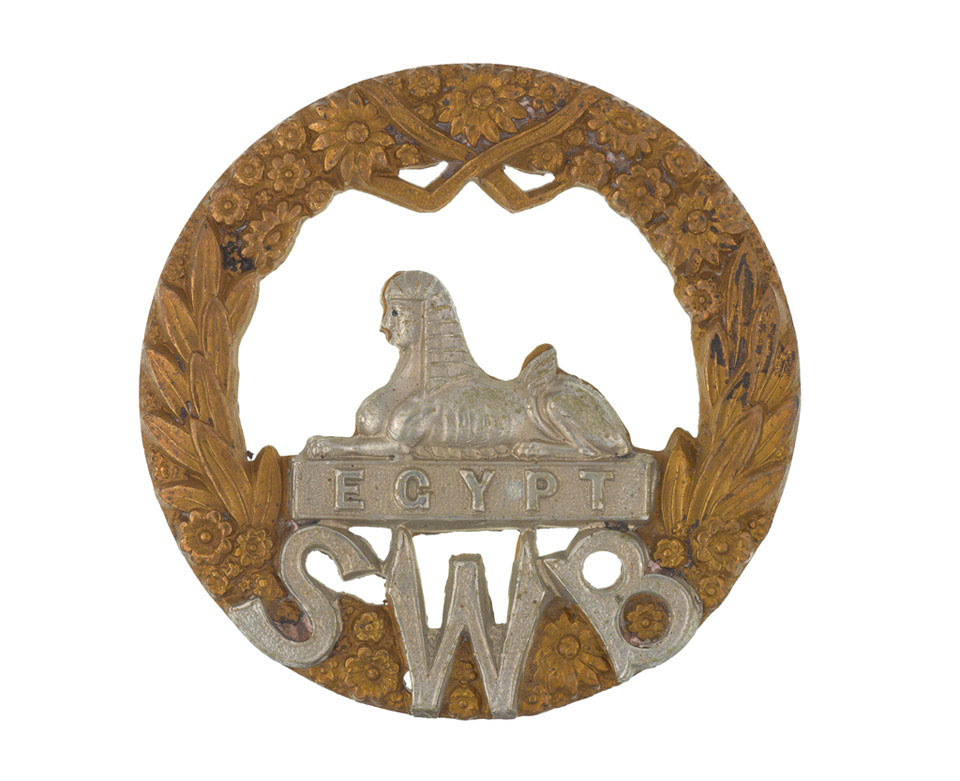
- c. 1896 cap badge of the South Wales Borderers
- Active: 15 March 1915–10 February 1918
- Allegiance: United Kingdom
- Branch: New Army
- Type: Bantam battalion
- Role: Infantry
- Size: One Battalion
- Part of: 40th Division
- Garrison/HQ: Newport, Wales
- Patron: Welsh National Executive Committee
- Engagements: German retreat to the Hindenburg Line; Battle of Cambrai

The 12th (Service) Battalion, South Wales Borderers (3rd Gwent) was a Welsh Bantam battalion recruited in World War I as part of 'Kitchener's Army' from men who were below the normal minimum height required by the British Army. It formed part of the Welsh Bantam Brigade, later 119th Brigade, and served on the Western Front. It saw a good deal of action along the Hindenburg Line and at Cambrai before being broken up early in 1918 to provide reinforcements to other units.

== Recruitment ==
Alfred Leete's recruitment poster for Kitchener's Army.

On 6 August 1914, less than 48 hours after Britain's declaration of war, Parliament sanctioned an increase of 500,000 men for the Regular British Army, and the newly appointed secretary of state for war, Earl Kitchener of Khartoum issued his famous call to arms: 'Your King and Country Need You', urging the first 100,000 volunteers to come forward. This group of six divisions with supporting arms became known as Kitchener's First New Army, or 'K1'. K2, K3 and K4 followed shortly afterwards. However, these were soon joined by groups of men from particular localities or backgrounds who wished to serve together. Starting in London and Liverpool, the phenomenon of 'Pals battalions' quickly spread across the country, as local recruiting committees offered complete units to the War Office (WO), which constituted the Fifth New Army (K5). One such organisation was the 'Welsh National Executive Committee' (WNEC), which on 10 October 1914 was authorised to form a complete Welsh Army Corps of two divisions.

However, a large number of otherwise medically fit volunteers were being turned away because they did not meet the minimum height requirement of the prewar Regular Army, of 5 feet 3 inches (160 cm). Alfred Bigland, the Member of Parliament for Birkenhead, persuaded Kitchener that this pool of potential manpower should be tapped, and he was given authority to raise a battalion of 'Bantams' (named after the small but pugnacious fighting cock). Three Bantam battalions were quickly raised at Birkenhead for the Cheshire Regiment, many of them coal miners who had travelled long distances to enlist, including from Wales, and the scheme spread to other areas. The WO authorised each military district to recruit a battalion, attached to whichever regimental depot had sufficient capacity.

The WNEC accordingly began recruiting Bantams. Although it was among those authorised on 10 October 1914, the 3rd Gwent Battalion had been slow to form. On 22 January 1915 the WNEC approved it being raised as a bantam battalion under the designation of 12th (Service) Battalion, South Wales Borderers (12th SWB). The first officer was appointed on 30 January, the first recruits enlisted on 7 February, and the first company began assembling at Newport on 15 March. It was attached to the 3rd Welsh Brigade forming at Colwyn Bay in North Wales, but never actually joined it. On the recommendation of Brig-Gen H.J. Evans of 115th Bde, Major E.A. Pope joined from 3rd (Reserve) Battalion, Welsh Regiment, to take command of 12th SWB on 21 April with the rank of Lieutenant-Colonel. Pope began recruiting enthusiastically, and on 1 May the battalion's second company was formed. Facing the same shortage of instructors as all the other Kitchener units, the 12th SWB borrowed drill instructors from the Glamorgan Constabulary. On 18 May 12th SWB, then roughly 470 strong, formed its C Company, and finally D Company three weeks later. In early July 1915 12th SWB left Newport for Prees Heath Camp, where it joined the newly formed Welsh Bantam Brigade.

Unlike the other units of the Welsh Bantam Brigade (19th (S) Bn, Royal Welsh Fusiliers (RWF), 17th and 18th (S) Bns Welsh Regiment (WR)), 12th SWB struggled to reach its full establishment of 1250 men, being around 900 strong in September and only completing at the end of 1915. However, the battalion seems to have been better than the others at rejecting physically unfit or under-age recruits, which were a problem for all bantam units after the initial volunteer rush of fit miners and other manual workers had waned. A modern analysis of the battalion's make-up shows that only just over 20 per cent of the men came from Wales (Monmouth and Glamorgan, with small numbers from Radnorshire and Brecknockshire); large numbers of the bantams came from Yorkshire, Lancashire, London, Staffordshire, and other English counties, and most were manual labourers rather than miners. Discipline was also poor among the recruits of 12th SWB, with fights constantly breaking out among the men.

All Kitchener units suffered shortages of uniforms, kit and weapons in their early days. Until khaki cloth could be supplied, most of the men recruited by the WNEC were clothed in the grey Welsh cloth known as Brethyn Llwyd, but there is no evidence that the later-recruited 12th SWB ever wore these uniforms. However, even when khaki was available, all the bantam units had trouble obtaining uniforms and boots in smaller sizes. Each battalion raised by the WNEC received a hundred Lee–Metford rifles of Boer War vintage for training.

== Training ==
The WNEC had failed in its attempt to raise two complete divisions; 38th (Welsh) Division was completed, but the Welsh Bantam Bde was instead assigned to 40th Division, which also included English and Scottish units. In September 1915 the brigade moved to Aldershot and became 119th Brigade of the division. The brigade moved into the training area at Blackdown Camp in December. 40th Division had been intended to be a second Bantam division (after 35th Division), but again the supply of recruits was insufficient and the other two brigades were hybrids, with just two Bantam battalions each. Worse, many of the men enlisted by these battalions were not simply undersized but actually unfit for service. 120th and 121st Brigades had to be completely reorganised with normal battalions, holding up the division's training for several months. Once this reorganisation was completed in late February 1916 the training was intensified. In the spring there was a rumour that it would be deployed to Ireland to help suppress the Easter Rising, but this did not happen. Instead in mid-May it was warned to prepare to move to the Western Front. Men who were unfit or required for munitions work were transferred out and replaced by men from the Local Reserve battalions (13th and 14th SWB). Mobilisation was completed between 27 and 31 May and the battalion entrained at Frimley for embarkation at Southampton Docks on 1 June. 12th SWB landed at Le Havre in France next day, under the command of Lt-Col Pope. By 9 June the division had completed its concentration in the Lillers area near Béthune.

=== 14th (Reserve) Battalion ===
When 12th SWB left Prees Heath in September 1915 it left behind its depot company to continue training recruits. This was expanded into a Local Reserve battalion as 14th (Reserve) Battalion, SWB and in October it moved to Conway. In November Lt-Col Herbert Porter (Indian Army, retired) was posted from 11th SWB to command 14th (R) Bn. About January 1916 the battalion moved to Kinmel Camp where it joined 14th Reserve Brigade as part of the Rhyl Training Centre. Here it was swelled by transfers from 21st (R) Bn, RWF, in 14th Reserve Bde, and from 19th RWF in 119th Bde at Blackdown. These allowed 14th SWB to form B Company at the end of January. Recruits flowed in steadily, mostly from South Wales but with substantial numbers from London, Lancashire and Cheshire. C Company was formed on 1 April and D Company later that month. When 12th SWB was mobilised for the Western Front, 14th (R) Bn supplied a large draft to bring it up to war establishment, receiving in turn the home service details of 12th SWB and 19th RWF. Some of the men received were classified as labour recruits and were transferred to Class W of the Army Reserve and sent off to work in the munitions factories of Coventry or the coal mines of South Wales. On 8 July Lt-Col Porter was succeeded in command by Brevet Colonel William Beresford-Ash, a retired officer of the RWF. On 1 September 1916 the local reserve battalions were transferred to the Training Reserve (TR) and 14th (R) Bn SWB became 65th Training Reserve Battalion. 14th (R) Bn had just sent a large draft of 250 reinforcements to the Wester Front, and a further 600 were transferred to 3rd (R) Bn, leaving few men to form the new TR battalion under Col Beresford-Ash (the training staff retained their SWB cap badges).

On 4 July 1917 65th TR Bn was redesignated 234th (Infantry) Battalion, TR, and on 27 July it moved to Herringfleet and joined 205th (2nd Welsh Border) Brigade in 68th (2nd Welsh) Division in the east coast defences. Then on 1 November it was transferred to become 52nd (Graduated) Battalion, Welsh Regiment, still in 205th Bde. It moved to Lowestoft for the winter, then by May 1918 it was at Saxmundham, then went to Henham Park, east of Halesworth, where it remained until the Armistice with Germany. Postwar it was converted into a service battalion on 8 February 1919 and the following month was sent to join 2nd Brigade of Western Division serving in the occupation forces with British Army of the Rhine. The brigade was broken up in July 1919 and the battalion was disbanded on 31 March 1920.

== Service ==
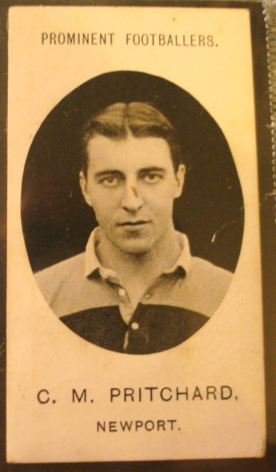
Welsh rugby international Charlie Pritchard, mortally wounded in August 1916 while leading a raid on enemy lines.

12th SWB spent its first week after joining the British Expeditionary Force (BEF) engaged in training, for example in the use of anti-gas helmets. On 12 June it was sent to the front to be attached by companies to battalions of 3rd Bde in 1st Division: A and B to 1st SWB, C and D to 2nd WR. After this introduction to trench warfare, 40th Division took over the Calonne sector from 1st Division on 3 July. Although both armies were concentrating on the Somme Offensive further south, units in the Calonne sector still saw casualties mount up during the summer. Enemy snipers and trench mortars were active, and 12th SWB carried out its first trench raids. One of these, on 12 August, was led by former Welsh rugby international Captain Charlie Pritchard. Although the raid was successful in obtaining 40th Division's first prisoner for identification, Pritchard was mortally wounded. In September the division moved to the Loos sector, where it was stationed facing the famous Double Crassier spoil-heap. Here the lines were relatively close together and the German wire was unusually deep, making raids difficult. An attempted raid by 12th SWB was disrupted when the Germans fired a small defensive mine when the raiders entered the front trench.

40th Division was relieved at the end of October and moved south to join Fourth Army, with 119th Brigade at Bellancourt. Three weeks' training was carried out before 40th Division took over the front line in the Somme Sector. Here there was complete destruction left by that summer's fighting. The front line troops spent the winter among a maze of smashed and flooded trenches and dugouts, under occasional bombardments. Living in these conditions the number of sick and cases of Trench foot rose sharply. Brigadier-General Charles Cunliffe-Owen left 119th Bde on 16 November and Lt-Col Pope officiated as brigade commander until Brig-Gen Frank Crozier arrived to take over on 20 November. Crozier later regarded 12th SWB as the best battalion in the brigade, thanks to Lt-Col Pope's training. However, on 21 November the battalion suffered an outbreak of collective disobedience when 19 men of D Company refused to fall in on defaulters' parade. They were tried for disobedience of orders by a Field General Court Martial and 17 were found guilty and sentenced to various punishments. Most of these men seem to have been recruited from South Yorkshire and the North Midlands of England. After this event, the disciplinary record of 12th SWB became the best in the brigade.

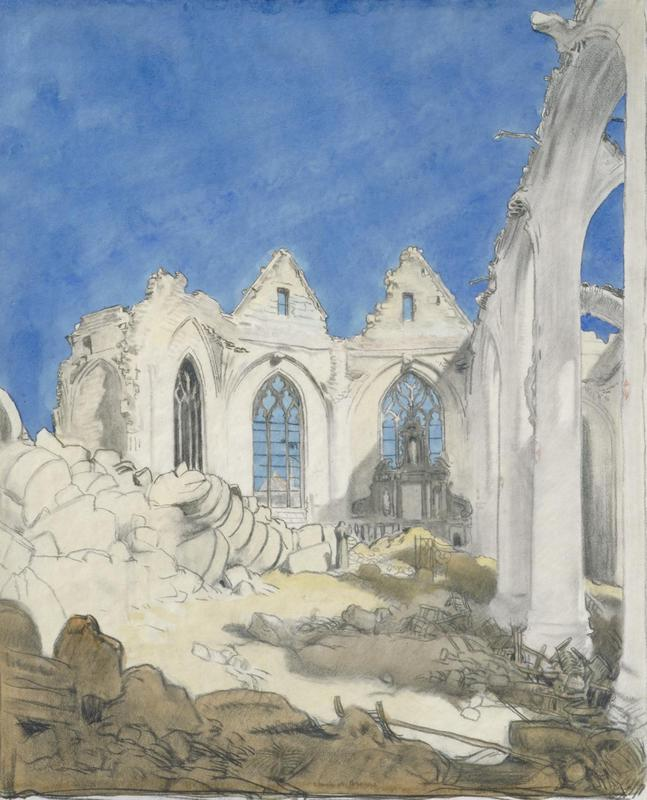
The Church, Péronne, by Sir William Orpen.

=== Hindenburg Line ===
Training for the battalions was stepped up during the winter, with emphasis on Lewis guns and the new 'fighting platoon' tactics. Trench-raiding by both sides resumed when the weather improved in March 1917 – 40th Division was ordered to penetrate into the German lines at least once a week. On 17 March 12th SWB raided the enemy line under cover of bad weather, and reported it only lightly held. That day the Germans had begun withdrawing from in front of 40th Division. This was part of a large-scale retreat to the prepared positions of the Hindenburg Line (Operation Alberich). The division immediately began cautiously following up, with patrols out in front, in contact with German rearguards. It passed through Péronne on 18 March and continued its deliberate advance until the evening of 24 March when it was leapfrogged by another division taking the lead. 40th Division was then set to repairing the roads and railways that had been destroyed by the retreating enemy. Crozier found that his little Welsh miners excelled at this work. Once communications had been restored, XV Corps, to which 40th Division belonged, closed up to the Hindenburg Line during the first three weeks of April. German resistance stiffened among the fortified villages they held as outworks to their main line.

On 20 April 40th Division was ordered to attack next morning to seize one of these outworks, the village of Gonnelieu. Of the two brigades in the front line, 120th on the left would take the village, while 119th dealt with 'Fifteen Ravine' to its right. The 'ravine' was actually a gully no more than 10 feet (3.0 m) deep. Other than the roads being cratered, this open countryside was untouched by war and covered by long grass. For 119th Bde 19th RWF (left) and 12th SWB (right) led, followed by 18th WR in support and 17th WR in reserve. 12th SWB was organised with two platoons of A Company on its right and two of B Company on its left; two platoons of C Company provided 'moppers-up', while the remainder of C Company and the whole of D Company provided the supporting wave, also carrying picks and shovels to consolidate the captured positions. The attackers formed up in the dark on tapes laid out well ahead of their own positions. The covering barrage opened at 04.15 on 21 April and the two leading battalions followed the Creeping barrage when it moved off at 04.20, pressing forward through a German counter-barrage. 120th Brigade found its task easy, as did 19th RWF, which was soon on its objective and was able to carry out a raid to help the neighbouring division. The Germans opposite 12th SWB put up a stiffer fight. At 05.00 its advance was halted by snipers and machine guns; these were dealt with and by 05.15 the ravine was in the Borderers' hands, and the moppers-up were clearing German trenches and dugouts. However, the barrage and moppers-up had missed three strongpoints in front of the ravine, and the garrisons of these posts opened fire in the rear of B Company and on the carrying parties from 119th Brigade Trench Mortar Battery, who were bringing forward supplies for the battalion. 12th SWB's Intelligence Officer collected a platoon of 18th WR and dealt with these strongpoints. A Company meanwhile had drifted slightly right to stay in touch with 19th RWF and had got ahead of the others in the poorly defined ravine, so reluctantly it fell back into line. Enemy rifle and machine gun fire continued until the afternoon before dying down. 12th SWB's casualties were 3 officers and 12 other ranks (ORs) killed, 11 ORs missing, 3 officers and 45 ORs wounded, or about one-third of those attacking; it also captured 40 prisoners. The men of 12th SWB had expected to be relieved once they were on the objective, but they had to work from 15.00 to 02.00 next morning creating advanced supply dumps, a battalion Headquarters (HQ) position and an advanced dressing station. The attackers received congratulations from Corps and Army HQs for an operation carried out with steadiness and precision.

12th SWB and 19th RWF were in brigade reserve when 40th Division attacked Villers-Plouich on 24 April; together they amounted to a single weak battalion. At one point 119th Bde was warned to wheel to help 120th Bde's stalled attack on Beaucamps, with 12th SWB coming up into the line, but Villers-Plouich itself was successfully captured and this order was cancelled. The last village in the area still held by the Germans was La Vacquerie, and 40th Division took part in an operation against it on the night of 4/5 May. 119th Brigade had the task of raiding the village itself, with 12th SWB on the right and 17th WR on the left. Each battalion was to attack with two companies in columns of platoons to pass through the village and hold the far side, while the 'moppers-up' of 19th RWF and 224th Field Company, Royal Engineers, destroyed all the dugouts and cellars. The attackers formed up in No man's land and when the barrage fell at 23.00 they went forward. The right of 12th SWB was held up by wire but forced its way through despite heavy artillery and mortar fire. The left half met little opposition until the village was reached at 23.20, when it ran in to a great deal of wire and came under rifle and machine gunfire from the north west. The moppers-up and Sappers got mixed up in the fighting, but they carried out several demolitions before the recall signal was made at 01.00.

Lieutenant-Col Pope of 12th SWB was evacuated injured; according to Crozier, he tripped over some rusty wire and injured his face. Although he returned to duty in command of 3rd WR at home, he died in hospital two years later from the infection resulting from his injury. He was replaced by Maj Robert Benzie, a prewar officer in the Ceylon Planters' Rifle Corps who had just arrived from the Scottish Rifles to be second-in-command of 12th SWB. He was promoted to Acting Lt-Col on 3 May 1917.

The division continued offensive patrols and raiding during the summer: 119th Bde was notably successful, and Crozier praised the SWB's 'well-planned raids'. When not in the front line the battalions spent much of their time digging and improving trenches and roads. They remained under strength, though 12th SWB did receive some reinforcements from the Monmouthshire Regiment of the Territorial Force.

=== Cambrai ===
After six months' continuous service in the line, 40th Division was relieved at the beginning of October and went to the Fosseux area for rest. It then moved to the wooded area round Lucheux to begin training for the forthcoming Battle of Cambrai, with particular emphasis on fighting in woods, ready for action in Bourlon Wood. The battle began with a massed tank attack on 20 November that broke through the Hindenburg Line, and the division moved up on 22 November as far as 'Danger Corner' in order attack Bourlon Wood next morning. The capture of the wood by 40th and 51st (Highland) Divisions would provide a defensive flank to allow Third Army to continue developing the successes of the first two days. 40th Division moved up during the night to take over the front, and the men were tired by the difficult approach march. The assault was launched at 10.30 with 119th Bde on the right. The attacking infantry were preceded by a barrage of high explosive and shrapnel shells that fell on the edge of the wood at 10.10 and then lifted forwards 200 yards (180 m) every 10 minutes from 10.30. The barrage was supposed to include smoke shells, but they did not arrive in time, though the morning mist gave some cover to the attackers. 119th Brigade had 12th SWB on its right and 19th RWF on the left, each battalion attacking on a two-company front, and 12th SWB was to be supported by 16 tanks of G battalion, Tank Corps. It was to attack straight through the wood towards Bourlon village. Traffic jams meant that G Battalion's tanks had been unable to resupply overnight, and they did not move up until 12.00. However, four tanks of D Battalion were switched across from 121st Bde and preceded the left hand company of 12th SWB at Zero.

12th SWB had never worked with tanks before, but they followed the four D Battalion tanks and the barrage into the wood. They met fierce opposition, and although two of the tanks did good work up the western edge of the wood, the battalion's progress up the wooded slope was slow and casualties were heavy. They cleared the Fontaine–Bourlon road, a sunken lane crossing the wood that contained many dugouts and machine gun posts. Pressing on, the right company reached and entered the houses at the eastern end of village, while the left company, reinforced by some of the support battalion (17th WR) came up behind. Then a German counter-attack from the village drove the left company back to the Fontaine–Bourlon road, isolating the right company. That company fought its way out with the help of a tank and extended the line along the road. A gap had opened up and there was no sign of the 19th RWF to their left. By 15.00 the whole of 12th SWB and two companies of 17th WR were holding the line of the road when they came under a heavy bombardment followed by a powerful German counter-attack that threatened to envelop and overwhelm them. They held on desperately, but just in time 18th WR came up from brigade reserve. The fight now swayed back and forth, but the Germans began to waver and fall back. The Welsh battalions were then able to press forwards and they took the crest of the ridge at nightfall. Reinforcements arrived in the shape of 200 dismounted men of the 15th Hussars and 119th Bde's works company and salvage section. Two companies of 14th Argyll and Sutherland Highlanders (A&SH) arrived about 20.00 from 120th Bde in divisional reserve, together with eight Vickers gun teams from 244th Machine Gun Company. Lieutenant-Col R. Benzie of 12th SWB was placed in command of this whole forward area (Maj William Brown taking command of the remnant of 12th SWB until he was wounded, assisted by Lt Evans), with Lt-Col J. Plunkett of 19th RWF commanding a composite battalion made up from the various troops of 119th Bde. Supplied with rations, water and ammunition that Crozier sent up into the wood, the force dug in during the night, covered by patrols. By morning they had established a continuous line from which they firmly repulsed two fierce counter-attacks by 11.30, even though both flanks were still open. About 15.00 another German attack began to make progress, but at 16.00 the mixed force of Welsh battalions, Highlanders and cavalry pressed forward again, pushing the enemy back down the northern slopes of the wood, where they were caught by the British barrage. A brigade of Guards Division came up to secure the open right flank and at midnight the survivors of 119th Bde in the wood were relieved by two companies of 11th King's Own (120th Bde) and 2nd Scots Guards, Lt-Cols Benzie and Plunkett overseeing their deployment. The brigade was formally relieved by 186th Bde of 62nd Division next day, and could then be withdrawn to reorganise and rest while the fighting for Bourlon village continued. 12th SWB's casualties had been 10 officers and 123 ORs killed and missing, 12 officers and 243 ORs wounded.

Lieutenant-Col Benzie was awarded a Bar to his Distinguished Service Order (DSO) for his work in Bourlon Wood. Unusually for a junior officer, Lt Evans was also awarded a DSO.

The whole of 40th Division was withdrawn at noon on 27 November and at the end of the month it was sent north to take over the line north-west of Bullecourt in the Arras sector. It occupied a captured section of the Hindenburg Line named 'Tunnel Trench' and held those positions through the winter, despite its very weak battalions. 119th Brigade resuming trench raids in December, but these had to be halted in January when a thaw made the trenches impassable: they could only be reached 'over the top' at night. 12th SWB finally carried out a planned raid on 'Dog Trench' on the night of 4/5 February. Two nights later it was withdrawn to Mory.

== Disbandment ==
By early 1918 the BEF was suffering a manpower crisis. Brigades had to be reduced from four to three battalions, and the surplus war-formed battalions were broken up to provide reinforcements for others. On 8 February 12th SWB at Mory began transferring troops to other units: 2 officers and 50 men from C Company went to 5th SWB in 19th (Western) Division, then two days later two drafts of 2 officers and 100 men each went to 1st SWB in 1st Division and 2nd SWB in 29th Division. The remainder of the battalion left 40th Division and joined VI Corps' Reinforcement Camp. On 16 February 12th (Service) Battalion, South Wales Borderers (3rd Gwent) was disbanded and its remaining personnel together with other disbanded battalion of 40th Division joined 9th Entrenching Battalion under VI Corps. Lieutenant-Col Benzie was transferred to command 14th A&SH, while Maj Brown went to 18th WR and later commanded that battalion.

== Insignia ==
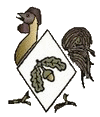
40th Division's insignia.

Initially, 40th Division used a white diamond as its formation sign; later the diamond was superimposed on a bantam cock (which had already been used by the bantam 35th Division) even though only 119th Bde was composed of bantams by then. After the fighting in Bourlon Wood the division added an acorn and two oak leaves on the diamond. This final version was issued as a cloth arm badge in late 1917 or early 1918. Battalions within 119th Bde also wore coloured geometric shapes on the sleeve: a green horizontal rectangle at the top of the arm in the case of 12th SWB.

== Memorials ==
The Harvard Memorial Chapel in Brecon Cathedral contains the South Wales Borderers' memorial to the dead of World War I.

40th Division's memorial is an altar in Bourlon Church dedicated on 27 May 1928 to those who died in Bourlon Wood in November 1917.
