= 119th Brigade (United Kingdom) =

Brigade of the British Army

Welsh Bantam Brigade 119th Brigade
- Active: 10 December 1914–27 April 1915; 27 April 1915–2 May 1918; 14 June 1918–May 1919; 9 November 1943–12 April 1944
- Country: United Kingdom
- Branch: New Army
- Type: Infantry
- Role: Infantry and deception
- Size: 3–4 Battalions
- Part of: 40th Division
- Patron: Welsh National Executive Committee
- Engagements: Hindenburg Line; Bourlon Wood

Commanders
- Notable commanders: C. Cunliffe-Owen; F.P. Crozier

The 119th Brigade (119th Bde), originally the Welsh Bantam Brigade, was an infantry brigade formation of the British Army during World War I. Part of Lord Kitchener's 'New Armies', it was formed of men under the normal regulation height, known as bantams. It served in the 40th Division on the Western Front, distinguishing itself in actions against the Hindenburg Line and the capture of Bourlon Wood. It was reorganised as a conventional brigade in early 1918 and served until the end of the war. The brigade number was reactivated for deception purposes during World War II.

== Original 119th Brigade ==
Alfred Leete's recruitment poster for Kitchener's Army.

On 6 August 1914, less than 48 hours after Britain's declaration of war, Parliament sanctioned an increase of 500,000 men for the Regular British Army. The newly appointed Secretary of State for War, Earl Kitchener of Khartoum, issued his famous call to arms: 'Your King and Country Need You', urging the first 100,000 volunteers to come forward. This group of six divisions with supporting arms became known as Kitchener's First New Army, or 'K1'. The K2, K3 and K4 battalions, brigades and divisions followed soon afterwards. The flood of volunteers overwhelmed the ability of the army to absorb and organise them, and by the time the Fifth New Army (K5) was authorised on 10 December 1914, many of the units were being formed by groups of men from particular localities or backgrounds who wished to serve together. Starting from London and Liverpool, the phenomenon of 'Pals battalions' quickly spread across the country, as local recruiting committees offered complete units to the War Office (WO). Thus 119th Brigade of 40th Division, formed on 10 December 1914, consisted of:

- 'West Ham Pals', later 13th (Service) Battalion, Essex Regiment (West Ham) – raised by the Mayor and Borough of West Ham on 27 December 1914
- 'Public Schools Battalion', later 16th (Service) Battalion, Middlesex Regiment (Public Schools) – raised Mr J.J. Mackay and a committee in St James's Street, London, on 1 September 1914
- '1st Football Battalion', later 17th (Service) Battalion, Middlesex Regiment (1st Football) – raised by William Joynson-Hicks, MP, at Fulham Town Hall on 12 December 1914
- 'Church Lads Brigade', later 16th (Service) Battalion, King's Royal Rifle Corps (Church Lads Brigade) – raised by Field Marshal Lord Grenfell and the Church Lads' Brigade on 19 September 1914

The battalions underwent their initial training close to their homes. Training for active service was held up for all the K5 units by the lack of equipment and instructors. On 10 April 1915 the WO decided to convert the K4 battalions into reserve units, to provide drafts for the K1–K3 battalions after they went overseas. The K4 divisions were broken up and the first six K5 divisions (37–42) and their constituent brigades were given the numbers of the disbanded K4 formations on 27 April 1915. 119th Brigade became 100th Brigade in 33rd Division. The later K5 formations then took up the vacant numbers.

== New 119th Brigade ==
One of the organisations recruiting for Kitchener's Army was the 'Welsh National Executive Committee' (WNEC). On 28 September 1914 David Lloyd George addressed a meeting of representatives from all over Wales, at which the committee was formed to seek permission to form a complete Welsh Army Corps of two divisions. The WO accepted the WNEC's proposal on 10 October and enrolment began. At the time a large number of otherwise medically fit volunteers were being turned away because they did not meet the minimum height requirement of the prewar Regular Army, of 5 feet 3 inches (160 cm). Alfred Bigland, the Member of Parliament for Birkenhead, persuaded Kitchener that this pool of potential manpower should be tapped, and he was given authority to raise a battalion of bantams (named after the small but pugnacious fighting cock). Three Bantam battalions were quickly raised at Birkenhead for the Cheshire Regiment, many of them coal miners who had travelled long distances to enlist, including from Wales, and the scheme spread to other areas. The WNEC accordingly began recruiting Welsh Bantams in December 1914. Initially these were into battalions already authorised for the three brigades of 1st Welsh Division, but soon afterwards it was realised that a complete Welsh Army Corps was over-ambitious. Only the 1st Welsh Division would be completed (as the 38th (Welsh) Division), but a fourth brigade would be created from the bantams: the Welsh Bantam Brigade with the following order of battle:

- 19th (Service) Battalion, Royal Welsh Fusiliers (RWF) – formed in North Wales in March 1915
- 12th (Service) Battalion, South Wales Borderers (3rd Gwent) (SWB) – formed at Newport in March 1915
- 17th (Service) Battalion, Welsh Regiment (1st Glamorgan) (WR) – formed at Cardiff in December 1914
- 18th (Service) Battalion, Welsh Regiment (2nd Glamorgan) – formed at Cardiff in January 1915

On 27 April 1915 a new 40th Division was authorised to replace the disbanded K4 formation: the Welsh Bantam Bde was assigned to it and when the military authorities took over its administration from the WNEC on 27 August it formally adopted the identity of the disbanded 119th Brigade.

== Training ==
The battalions began their training scattered over Wales:

- 19th RWF at Deganwy alongside 38th (W) Division troops
- 12th SWB at Newport
- 17th WR at Colwyn Bay with 38th (W) Division troops
- 18th WR at Porthcawl with 38th (W) Division troops

From 12 July 1915 the battalions began moving to a new hutted camp at Prees Heath near Whitchurch, Shropshire. Retired Lieutenant-Colonel Rodney Style, formerly of the Queen's Own (Royal West Kent Regiment), was appointed on 22 July to command the brigade with the rank of Brigadier-General. After two months' training at Prees Heath 119th Bde moved in September to Aldershot where 40th Division was assembling. The brigade moved into the training area at Blackdown Camp in December. 40th Division had been intended to be a second Bantam division (after 35th Division), but the supply of recruits was insufficient and the other two brigades were hybrids, with just two Bantam battalions each. Worse, many of the men enlisted by these battalions were not simply undersized but actually unfit for service, unlike 119th Bde's 'hardy, well-knit Welshmen'. 120th and 121st Brigades had to be completely reorganised with normal battalions, holding up the division's training for several months. Once this reorganisation was completed in late February 1916 the training was intensified. In the spring there was a rumour that it would be deployed to Ireland to help suppress the Easter Rising, but this did not happen. Instead in mid-May it was warned to prepare to move to the Western Front. Brigadier-Gen Style had been replaced earlier in the month by an officer with recent battle experience, Brig-Gen Charles Prichard from the Northamptonshire Regiment. Mobilisation was completed between 27 and 31 May and the battalions began entraining on 1 June for embarkation at Southampton Docks. They disembarked at Le Havre in France and by 9 June the division had completed its concentration in the Lillers area near Béthune.

== Operations ==
After joining the British Expeditionary Force (BEF) the division's units were sent to the front to be attached by companies to battalions of 1st Division for their introduction to trench warfare.

During this time 119th Bde was joined by its auxiliary units:

- 119th Brigade Machine Gun (MG) Company, Machine Gun Corps (MGC) – formed at Grantham, disembarked at Le Havre 17 June 1916 and joined at Bruay on 19 June
- 115th Trench Mortar Battery (TMB) – formed within the brigade by 25 June 1916; personnel seconded from the infantry battalions; equipped with 3-inch Stokes mortars

40th Division then took over the Calonne sector from 1st Division on 3 July. Although both armies were concentrating on the Somme Offensive further south, units in the Calonne sector still saw casualties mount up during the summer, from enemy bombardments, snipers and trench mortars. The units were also expected to carry out regular trench raids: 18th WR of 119th Bde carried out the division's first in July. But by 15 August the brigade had only made one more (by 12th SWB two days earlier), and this lack of activity may have contributed to the replacement of Brig-Gen Prichard on that day by Charles Cunliffe-Owen, previously Commander, Royal Artillery, of Australian Corps. Under Cunliffe-Owen the brigade's raiding increased considerably, but he was being groomed for higher command and only stayed with 119th Bde for three months before he left. He was succeeded by a noted 'fighting general', Brig-Gen Frank Crozier, previously commanding officer of 9th Royal Irish Rifles in 36th (Ulster) Division.

Crozier was warned when he took over 119th Bde that it was the worst in the division. His followed Napoleon's dictum 'There are no bad soldiers, only bad colonels', and his thorough training of the brigade was accompanied by a thorough weeding out of battalion commanders and staff officers he considered unfit for their positions.

=== Hindenburg Line ===
During the bitter winter of 1916–17 40th Division remained in the mud of the old Somme battlefield, continuing its training where possible, with emphasis on Lewis guns and the new 'fighting platoon' tactics. Trench-raiding by both sides resumed when the weather improved in March 1917 – 40th Division was ordered to penetrate into the German lines at least once a week. On 17 March 12th SWB raided the enemy line under cover of bad weather, and reported it only lightly held. That day the Germans had begun withdrawing from in front of 40th Division. This was part of a large-scale retreat to the prepared positions of the Hindenburg Line (Operation Alberich). The division immediately began cautiously following up, with patrols out in front, in contact with German rearguards. It passed through Péronne on 18 March. On 21 March Brig-Gen Crozier was ordered to form a 'flying column' for the pursuit. This consisted of 17th WR, the corps mounted troops, a section of Royal Field Artillery with a proportion of the Divisional Ammunition Column, a platoon from the divisional pioneers (12th Green Howards) a section of 137th Field Ambulance, Royal Army Medical Corps, and 119th Bde HQ and signals. To their disappointment, they were not allowed to go any faster than the daily objective lines laid down by the staff. The division continued its deliberate advance until the evening of 24 March when it was leapfrogged by another division taking the lead. 40th Division was then set to repairing the roads and railways that had been destroyed by the retreating enemy. Crozier found that his little Welsh miners excelled at this work. Once communications had been restored, XV Corps, to which 40th Division belonged, closed up to the Hindenburg Line during the first three weeks of April.

By early April the BEF had followed up to the line of fortified villages that formed the outpost screen for the Hindenburg Line. It was here that German resistance stiffened and 119th Bde fought its first offensive actions. On 20 April 40th Division was ordered to attack next morning to seize one of these outworks, the village of Gonnelieu. Of the two brigades in the front line, 120th on the left would take the village, while 119th dealt with 'Fifteen Ravine' to its right. The 'ravine' was actually a gully no more than 10 feet (3.0 m) deep. Other than the roads being cratered, this open countryside was untouched by war and covered by long grass. For 119th Bde 19th RWF (left) and 12th SWB (right) led, followed by 18th WR in support and 17th WR in reserve. The attackers formed up in the dark on tapes laid out well ahead of their own positions. The covering barrage opened at 04.15 on 21 April and the two leading battalions followed the Creeping barrage when it moved off at 04.20, pressing forward through a German counter-barrage. 19th RWF found its task easy, which was soon on its objective and was later able to carry out a raid to help the neighbouring division. The Germans opposite 12th SWB put up a stiffer fight with snipers and machine guns, but these were dealt with and by 05.15 the ravine was in the Borderers' hands, and the moppers-up were clearing German trenches and dugouts. However, the barrage and moppers-up had missed three strongpoints in front of the ravine, and the garrisons of these posts opened fire in the rear of 12th SWB and on the carrying parties from 119th Brigade Trench Mortar Battery, who were bringing forward supplies for the battalion. 12th SWB's Intelligence Officer collected a platoon of 18th WR and dealt with these strongpoints. The attackers received congratulations from Corps and Army HQs for an operation carried out with steadiness and precision.

40th Division attacked Villers-Plouich on 24 April; 119th Bde's objective was a line of low spurs between that village and Gonnelieu. 17th and 18th Welsh led, on left and right respectively, while 19th RWF and 12th SWB (together amounting to a single weak battalion) were in support and brigade reserve respectively. Each of the leading battalions was supported by four mortars from 119th TMB and 119th MG Company supported the attack with direct fire from camouflaged positions. Crozier also had 13th Green Howards from 121st Bde under his command. 18th Welsh moved off just before midnight and by 02.05 had reached its objective with practically no resistance and had completed four platoon strongpoints on the spur before dawn. 17th Welsh also moved out before dawn, forming up on tapes in No man's land and then advancing at Zero (04.15) with two companies in line of platoon columns and two companies in support. The troops followed the creeping barrage, the enemy counter-barrage passing over their heads and falling on the trenches they had already vacated. They were held up by two belts of barbed wire, but found a way through and began bombing the enemy out of their trenches. The battalion had secured all its objectives and was consolidating by 07.00. So far all had gone well, but shortly before 10.00 a party of Germans missed by 18th Welch in the dark opened fire in the battalion's rear and had to be dealt with. About the same time word was received from Divisional HQ that 120th Bde had been held up in front of Beaucamp and that 119th Bde might have to wheel inwards to capture that village. 19th RWF and 12th SWB were warned to move east of Villers-Plouich and for 13th Green Howards to come up, but this was not required and 119th Bde had finished its work for the day after what the divisional history calls a 'smart and well-managed attack'. The line of low spurs was later dubbed 'Welsh Ridge' by the BEF. Similarly 19th RWF settled in front of La Vacquerie, calling the position 'Fusilier Ridge'.

40th Division completed these operations on 5 May with an attack against La Vacquerie, the last outpost village in German hands in this sector. This was in the nature of a large-scale raid, what Crozier termed 'a game of tip and run' to damage the defences and cause casualties. 119th Brigade's objective was the village itself, and the ground just beyond. It attacked with 12th SWB on the right and 17th WR on the left (each with two companies in line, one in support and one in. reserve). 19th RWF and 18th WR in brigade support and reserve respectively. Once again the 16 Vickers guns of 119th MG Company fired from carefully camouflaged positions, four mortars of 119th TMB were in action and 224th (Doncaster) Field Company, Royal Engineers (RE), was attached to destroy enemy dugouts. Zero hour was fixed for 23.00 and the two assaulting battalions were to hold the objectives beyond the village until 01.00 to cover the work of destruction. The barrage came down on schedule and the attack began, though the moonlight was obscured by cloud and light rain. The right of 12th SWB was held up by wire and had to force its way through, as well as through the uncut wire in the village itself. These delays meant that the 'moppers-up' and the RE sappers were caught up in the fighting, and the destruction was not as extensive as hoped for. Fire coming in from the left showed that 121st Bde had been held up, and Maj R.J. Andrews of 17th WR, coordinating operations in. the village, had to order two platoons off to form a defensive flank in that direction. Promptly at 01.00 the officers began beating shellcases as gongs to signal the withdrawal, and the force retired unmolested. Casualties had been significant, but a few prisoners had been taken.

The brigade then spent the next five months in this area, consolidating and developing the new British front line, and patrolling No man's land (in which Crozier took a personal role). Crozier also continued to remove unsuitable commanding officers until he had a team that he trusted. The division continued raiding during the summer: 119th Bde was notably successful, and Crozier praised the SWB's 'well-planned raids'. When not in the front line the battalions spent much of their time digging and improving trenches and roads. They remained under strength.

=== Bourlon Wood ===
After six months' continuous service in the line, 40th Division was relieved at the beginning of October and went to the Fosseux area for rest. It then moved to the wooded area round Lucheux to begin training for the forthcoming Battle of Cambrai, with particular emphasis on fighting in woods, ready for action in Bourlon Wood. The battle began with a massed tank attack on 20 November that broke through the Hindenburg Line, and the division moved up on 22 November as far as 'Danger Corner' in order attack Bourlon Wood next morning. The capture of the wood by 40th and 51st (Highland) Divisions would provide a defensive flank to allow Third Army to continue developing the successes of the first two days. 40th Division moved up during the night to take over the front, and the men were tired by the difficult approach march. The assault was launched at 10.30 with 119th Bde on the right, deployed with 12th SWB on its right and 19th RWF on the left, each battalion attacking on a two-company front. The attacking infantry were preceded by a barrage of high explosive and shrapnel shells that fell on the edge of the wood at 10.10 and then lifted forwards 200 yards (180 m) every 10 minutes from 10.30. The barrage was supposed to include smoke shells, but they did not arrive in time, though the morning mist gave some cover to the attackers. 12th SWB was to attack straight through the wood towards Bourlon village, supported by 16 tanks of G battalion, Tank Corps. Traffic jams meant that G Battalion's tanks had been unable to resupply overnight, and they did not move up until 12.00. However, four tanks of D Battalion were switched across from 121st Bde and preceded the left hand company of 12th SWB at Zero. Despite the formation's lack of experience of fighting with tanks, 40th Division's attack was the most successful on 23 November. 12th SWB met fierce opposition and suffered heavy casualties moving over the open ground into the wood, but forced their way through to the edge of the village before a counter-attack forced them back to the Fontaine–Bourlon road, a sunken lane crossing the wood. Reinforced by two companies of 17th WR the battalion held this line against a German counter-attack that threatened to envelop and overwhelm them before 18th WR arrived just in time. Reinforcements arrived at nightfall in the shape of 200 dismounted men of the 15th Hussars and 119th Bde's works company and salvage section. Two companies of 14th Argyll and Sutherland Highlanders (A&SH) arrived about 20.00 from 120th Bde in divisional reserve, together with eight Vickers gun teams from 244th Machine Gun Company. Crozier placed Lt-Col R. Benzie of 12th SWB was placed in command of this whole forward area, with Lt-Col J. Plunkett of 19th RWF commanding a composite battalion made up from the various troops of 119th Bde. Supplied with rations, water and ammunition that Crozier sent up into the wood, the force dug in during the night, covered by patrols. By morning they had established a continuous line from which they firmly repulsed two fierce counter-attacks by 11.30, even though both flanks were still open. About 15.00 another German attack began to make progress, but at 16.00 the mixed force of Welsh battalions, Highlanders and cavalry pressed forward again, pushing the enemy back down the northern slopes of the wood, where they were caught by the British barrage. A brigade of Guards Division came up to secure the open right flank and at midnight the survivors of 119th Bde in the wood were relieved by units of 120th Bde and the Guards, Lt-Cols Benzie and Plunkett overseeing their deployment. The brigade was formally relieved by 186th Bde of 62nd Division next day, and could then be withdrawn to reorganise and rest while the fighting for Bourlon village continued.

=== Reorganisation ===
After the losses of 1917 the Welsh Bantam Brigade had almost disappeared and by February 1918 the BEF was facing a manpower crisis. All brigades were reduced from four to three battalions, but 119th Bde was more extensively reorganised than most. After final successful raids 19th Royal Welsh Fusiliers and 12th South Wales Borderers sent drafts to their Regular battalions and were then disbanded, as was 17th Welsh after transferring a large draft to 18th Welsh. The remaining men of these battalions were used to form entrenching battalions. Only 18th Welsh of the original brigade remained. Crozier was upset by these decisions: he considered 19th RWF and 12th SWB to be his best battalions; he chose to keep the junior 18th Welsh because it was 'slightly less knocked about' than 17th. The brigade was brought up to the new three-battalion establishment by the transfer of a battalion each from 120th and 121st Bdes. (Originally 10th/11th Highland Light Infantry (HLI) from 15th (Scottish) Division was assigned to 119th Bde, but after two weeks this was exchanged with 120th Bde to make the latter a wholly Scottish formation.) As part of the BEF's reorganisation the Brigade Machine Gun Company joined a new 40th Divisional Machine Gun Battalion. The order of battle of 119th Bde from 25 February therefore was:

- 18th (Service) Battalion, Welsh Regiment (2nd Glamorgan)
- 13th (Service) Battalion, East Surrey Regiment (Wandsworth) – from 120th Bde
- 21st (Service) Battalion, Middlesex Regiment (Islington) – from 121st Bde
- 119th Trench Mortar Battery

Crozier believed that both his two new battalions had previously let him down at Bourlon Wood, and he trained the brigade hard, using 18th WR as the demonstration battalion.

=== German Spring Offensive ===
The Germans launched the first phase of their long-anticipated Spring Offensive (Operation Michael) on 21 March and secured immediate breakthroughs. At the time 40th Division was in GHQ reserve. During the first day 119th Bde was around Mercatel at half an hour's notice to move; 40th Division passed from GHQ to VI Corps' reserve at midday. 120th and 121st Bdes were sent forward but VI Corps ordered 119th Bde to wait at Achiet-le-Grand. As it grew dark about 17.30, Crozier was personally ordered by a corps staff officer to move towards the threatened Henin Hill in the second line of defences. Despite chaos on the roads the brigade arrived by 22.30, taking up position on and behind the hill. At 00.15 next morning it had to make another night march to go into reserve to 34th Division, which had been engaged all day. By dawn 18th WR had taken up position in the Sensée Switch trench west of St-Léger, with 13th ES in support and 21st Middlesex in reserve. Crozier spent the morning visiting his battalions. By 14.15 there were no British troops in front of 18th WR. At 18.00 news came that St-Léger had been captured and two companies of 13th ES were ordered to attack the village with two tanks, but 18th WR saw an opportunity, commandeered the tanks, and carried out the attack instead, stopping the Germans. By nightfall 13th ES formed the brigade's left, facing east, 18th WR the centre, and 21st Middlesex the right, facing northeast, giving 119th Bde a semicircular frontage of about 4,000 yards (3,700 m), with its right flank north of Mory. Early on 23 March the brigade was informed that the enemy had broken through at Mory. 4th Guards Brigade (31st Division) on its left was able to extend its line, allowing 119th Bde in turn to extend to the right. From here Crozier launched an attack on Mory with 13th ES and 21st Middlesex, ordering the CO of 13th ES to press on even when he reported being held up by machine gun fire. The brigade recovered Mory about 17.00; in the face of German reinforcements the brigade quietly left the village after dark and then had easy targets to fire into, causing enormous casualties to the Germans massed to attack. Next day (24 March) 119th Bde was drawn up east of Ervillers with brigade HQ in the catacombs of Gomiécourt with other HQs. When the Germans moved up the valley below, 119th and 4th Guards brigades' small-arms fire from enfilade, together with 40th Divisional Artillery, stopped the movement. However, by 18.00 German forces had broken through from the direction of St-Léger and 4th Gds Bde was withdrawing. The position of 119th Bde was critical but it had no orders. Crozier now had to put into practice the lesson of the Battle of Spion Kop that he had drummed into his officers: 'don't retire unless you're ordered to'. German patrols were in the neighbourhood of Gomiécourt, and Crozier ordered the catacombs cleared to prevent the various HQs and signal units from being captured. He expected his brigade to be 'mopped up' at daybreak on 25 March, but just in time he received permission to withdraw. The battalions fell back in turn, first 21st Middlesex, then 18th WR and finally 13th ES, to a line north of Ervillers, while HQ went to Courcelles. All through 25 March the right of 40th Division held off attacks, but it was relieved that night. 119th Brigade went back to Bucquoy, then next day to Bienvillers-au-Bois in response to rumours of a breakthrough by German armoured cars. 21st Middlesex reached Bienvillers first and deployed on the ridge to the south while 18th WR and 13th ES at Monchy-au-Bois formed the left flank of 40th Division. No attack came (the 'armoured cars' were French farm tractors), and the division finally left the line overnight. Its dogged defence of the spurs overlooking the Sensée Valley had done much to prevent the Germans expanding their breakthrough north towards Arras. 119th Brigade's casualties 21–26 March were 702 (52 killed), which was less than the other brigades of 40th Division; 13th ES still had a strength of 800.

=== Battle of the Lys ===
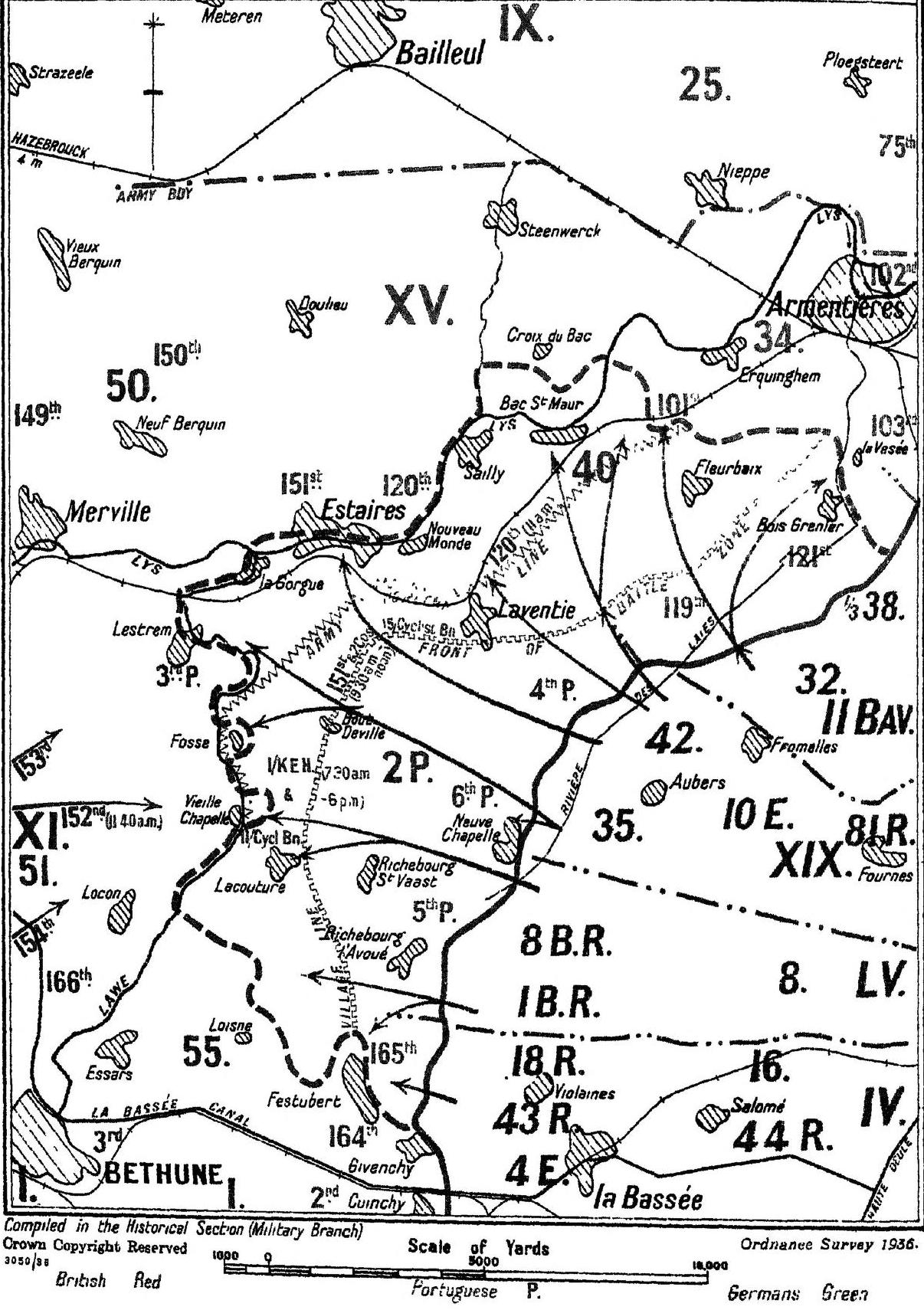
The German breakthrough to the Lys, 9 April 1918.

After the first phase of the German spring offensive, 40th Division was sent north to join First Army in a quiet sector to rest and refit. It moved to Merville, and then on the night of 6/7 April 119th Bde went into the line at Armentières next to the inexperienced Portuguese Expeditionary Corps. 18th Welsh (right) and 13th ES (left) were in the front trenches, 21st Middlesex in brigade reserve. The brigade also reconnoitred possible defensive flank positions if the Germans broke through the Portuguese. On the night of 8/9 April patrols from 18th WR and 13th ES entered the enemy front line, finding it unoccupied at 03.00. However, at 04.15 on 9 April the Germans launched the second main phase of their offensive (Operation Georgette, the Battle of the Lys) with a massive bombardment: while trench mortars bombed the forward trenches, heavier guns shelled strongpoints, HQs, villages and crossroads with high explosive and gas. 21st Middlesex immediately 'stood to' and moved up to its battle position behind the right flank of the brigade, taking casualties from the shelling in so doing. At 05.55 18th WR reported large numbers of Germans advancing on the Portuguese positions as the barrage lifted to the support line. Soon afterwards German troops penetrated between 18th WR and 13th ES and headed for the support line. The forward posts of 18th WR were 'mopped up' and few got away; the right company was surrounded by 08.20 and later eliminated. By 10.00 the Germans were close to 18th WR's battalion HQ, and the survivors of the battalion began a fighting withdrawal. Behind, 21st Middlesex heard at this time that the Portuguese line had collapsed. During the day repeated mistakes were made distinguishing Portuguese and Germans troops, and troops withheld their fire, enabling Germans to pass 119th Bde's flank while pursuing the Portuguese. By 11.00 21st Middlesex was also falling back. Initially 13th ES holding Fleurbaix was not attacked, but about 09.30 it found that it had been surrounded by the Germans who had penetrated to the support line, and it was soon overwhelmed, most of the battalion being captured. Some of its strongpoints held out until the afternoon, though Crozier was later critical of the speed with which the main body of 13th ES surrendered, and also of the slowness of 120th Bde coming up to form the defensive flank facing the broken Portuguese line. He improvised a defence line south of the River Lys with the divisional pioneers (12th Green Howards) and the remnants of his brigade. Part of 40th Bn MGC and 229th (Doncaster) Field Company, RE, held the bridges at Bac St Maur, to which Crozier ordered up the brigade training school to form a mobile reserve. Between 13.00 and 14.00 Crozier withdrew over the river and the REs blew the permanent bridge at 14.15, as well as destroying two of the three pontoon ridge, but the Germans occupied the houses along the riverbank and their fire prevented the destruction of the last pontoon bridge. The remnants of 21st Middlesex withdrew across the bridge downstream at Sailly-sur-la-Lys about 16.00. 119th Brigade's HQ with the trench mortar men, cooks and various other details briefly held the line, but were driven back by the fire and lost direct observation over the river, where a German regiment began crossing the intact bridge at 16.00. However, the stand had allowed the remnants of the brigade to take up a position about 1 mile (1.6 km) back at Croix au Bac. At about 17.00 74th Bde of 25th Division arrived to relieve 119th Bde. 40th Divisional HQ ordered it back about 2 miles (3.2 km) to Le Petit Mortier Farm, behind the Steenwerck Switch trench, where the brigade school and other details were organised into a composite 119th Brigade Battalion about 300 strong. This and the similar 120th Bde Bn the manned the Steenwerck Switch that night. The retirement by stages continued for another 2 km next day, 119th Bde HQ employing a Lewis gun mounted on a staff car, until it took up a position at Le Verrier, near Le Doulieu. About 16.00 18th WR counter-attacked and gained a series of depressions in front that got them out of the shelled zone. About dusk a rumour went round of a further retreat that night, but this was quashed and the men returned to their line of rifle pits. Next morning (11 April) the composite units drove back three more attacks, supported by a battalion from the neighbouring 29th Division. The brigade was relieved that evening and moved off to Strazeele, though it was still daylight and the troops were harassed by German aircraft while on the move.

After suffering crippling losses in these actions, 40th Division was withdrawn from the line and temporarily formed into two Composite Brigades. No 2 Composite Brigade formed under Brig-Gen Crozier on 27 April 1918 consisted of:

- A Battalion (18th WR)
- B Battalion (13th ES)
- C Battalion (10/11th and 14th HLI from 120th Bde)
- Company of 40th Battalion, MGC
- 136th Field Ambulance Royal Army Medical Corps
- No 2 Company, 40th Divisional Train, Army Service Corps

2nd Composite Brigade was employed in digging the Poperinghe Line in case of further German breakthroughs. It was withdrawn on 2 May, and in common with the rest of the division the units were reduced to training cadres to instruct newly arrived US Army units, and later sent to England to be reconstituted. 40th Divisional HQ and its brigade HQs were then employed to supervise British and Chinese Labour Corps companies digging first the Winnezeele Line and then an intermediate line between that and Saint-Omer.

== Reconstitution ==
In June 1918, 40th Division was reconstituted from 'Garrison Guard' battalions composed of men of Medical Category 'B1', many of them wounded former infantrymen who had been serving with the labour battalions. The division was officially revived on 14 June, when 119th Bde (still under Crozier) had the following composition:

- No 7 Garrison Guard Battalion became 13th (Garrison) Battalion, Royal Inniskilling Fusiliers (RIF)
- No 8 Garrison Guard Battalion became 13th (Garrison) Battalion, East Lancashire Regiment (ELR)
- No 11 Garrison Guard Battalion became 12th (Garrison) Battalion, North Staffordshire Regiment (NSR)
- 119th Trench Mortar Battery, reconstituted June–July 1918

The division was sent to hold the West Hazebrouck Line, a reserve position that was being prepared in case of a further German breakthrough. 119th Brigade, together with a company of REs and seven labour companies, was assigned the northern part of this line. By dint of 'weeding out' the least fit officers and men and by hard training, the reconstituted formation was made ready for frontline service; the battalions officially dropped the 'Garrison' part of their titles on 13 July 1918. On 18 July, 119th Bde was the first part of the division to re-enter the front line, taking over a trench sector under command of 1st Australian Division until the end of the month. The brigade was back in the line in August, taking a full part in trench raids, encouraged by Crozier's offer of a £5 reward for the first German prisoner brought in, and £1 for each subsequent capture.

=== Advance to Victory ===
On 27 August the reconstituted division made its first attack, with 119th Bde (temporarily commanded by Lt-Col Robert Johnson of 13th ELR) carrying out a limited operation planned by Lt-Col Plunkett (now commanding 13th RIF). The left flank was protected by a standing barrage of heavy artillery, which also targeted roads, crossroads and buildings, the right by the 4.5-inch howitzers. At 10.00 the attackers (13th RIF and a company of 12th NSR) advanced behind a creeping barrage fired by 54 18-pounder guns. German machine gun fire was fierce and in the first 300 yards (270 m) all four company commanders of 13th RIF became casualties. Within two hours the force had taken its first objective and two hours later it had completed its consolidation in a series of rifle pits. The ultimate objective was Rue Prevost: Plunkett observed that this was strongly held by the Germans and called down artillery fire on it, just as the enemy counter-attacked. Together with enfilade fire from Lewis guns, this attack was broken up, though 13th RIF spent an uncomfortable afternoon under enemy artillery fire. Casualties on both sides were high. Plunkett had calculated that Rue Prevost would be given up once he flanked it, but the subsidiary attack by 121st Bde had failed. 120th Brigade cleared the rest of the enemy salient on the afternoon of 29 August.

Next day 40th Division's patrols penetrated 500 yards (460 m) beyond the enemy front line and continued moving east as the Germans retreated on this front. 121st Brigade formed an advanced guard to begin the pursuit while 119th Bde manned the existing divisional front. On 6 September 119th Bde took over advanced guard duties, 13th ELR (with a fighting strength of 369 men) occupying the whole frontage of 5,000 yards (4,600 m). On 7 September 13 ELR was ordered to capture Pont de Nieppe and establish posts beyond it, but a counter-attack by 60–70 Germans forced the attacking company out of the village and back to its start line. Next day, 8 September, Crozier returned from leave and resumed command. On the night of 10/11 September patrols found Pont-de-Nieppe deserted and 12th NSR moved forward to occupy it with 13th RIF in support. German attempts to regain. the village were beaten off but 12th NSR was unable to get patrols across the unbridged, flooded Lys. 119th Brigade was then relieved.

After 10 days' rest and road-repair, 119th Bde returned to training and then went back into the line along the River Warnave. The REs threw bridges across the river on 28 September, but 13th ELR's first attempt to push patrols across were driven back. Posts were established on the far bank the following night, then 13th RIF took the village of Le Bizet. However, the open ground beyond Le Bizet made a direct advance inadvisable in daylight, so 13th RIF took it by an encircling movement before dawn, after which the battalion pushed on with its flanks in the air as far as the Lys, where it scouted possible bridging sites. The REs erected a footbridge on the night of 1 October and the battalion took Houplines in the morning, still with no sign of the brigade that was supposed to be on its flank. Nevertheless, the battalion advanced along the river and recovered about 4,000 yards (3,700 m) of the old British front line between the river and railway. This caused the Germans to evacuate Armentières. 12th NSR mopped up the captured ground on 4 October. 119th Brigade then took a full part in the 'Final Advance' of October–November 1918 from the Lys to the Scheldt, though it saw little action: Crozier treated the advanced guard work and an attack on Bondues as training exercises. On the night of 4/5 November 119th Bde took over the division's front around Pecq on the west bank of the Scheldt. Initial attempts to push patrols over footbridges failed, but after dark on 8 November the patrols were accompanied by Royal Artillery observers, who brought down fire on the German defences. The patrols reported signs of impending evacuation, and at 20.30 Crozier crossed the Scheldt by pontoon bridges with 13th ELR and 12th NSR. By the following morning 119th Bde had occupied a line across the railway on the higher ground beyond. Patrols continued pushing forward until 10 November, when 40th Division was withdrawn from the front. Hostilities ended next day with the signing of the Armistice with Germany.

=== Disbandment ===
After the Armistice, 40th Division was engaged in road repair and refresher courses for men returning to civilian trades. Demobilisation proceeded rapidly during January and February 1919, and its units were reduced to cadre strength by March. The divisional and brigade HQs closed in May and the final cadres returned to the UK for disbandment during June.

== Commanders ==
The following officers commanded the Welsh Bantam Brigade/119th Brigade during World War I:

- Brigadier-General R.C. Style (from 22 July 1915)
- Brigadier-General C.S. Prichard (from 8 May 1916)
- Brigadier-General C. Cunliffe-Owen (from 16 August 1916)
- Lieutenant-Colonel E.A. Pope, 12th SWB (acting, 16–20 November 1916)
- Brigadier-General F.P. Crozier (from 20 November 1916)
- Lieutenan-Colonel R.I.B. Johnson, 13th ELR (acting, 23 August–8 September 1918)

=== Brigade-majors ===
The following officers served as Brigade major of 119th Bde during World War I:

- Maj Robert Emile Shepherd Prentice, Highland Light Infantry (22 July– 24 October 1915)
- Capt Arthur Granville Soames, Coldstream Guards (24 October 1915 – 9 December 1916)
- Capt Seton James Montgomery, 15th Royal Scots (acting, 9 December 1916 – 5 January 1917)
- Capt Harry Leslie Reed, 20th Middlesex Regiment (temporary, 6 January–17 February 1917)
- Capt Guy Goodliffe, Royal Fusiliers (from 18 February 1917; absent on course from 13 December; promoted to General Staff Officer Grade 2, VIII Corps) 4 April 1918)
- Capt Percy Hone, 17th WR, staff captain 119th Bde (acting, 13 December 1917 – 4 April 1918)
- Capt Anthony John Muirhead, Oxfordshire Yeomanry (from 4 April 1918)

== Insignia ==
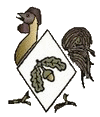
41st Division's insignia.

Initially, 40th Division used a white diamond as its formation sign; later the diamond was superimposed on a bantam cock (which had already been used by the bantam 35th Division) even though only 119th Bde was composed of bantams by then. After the fighting in Bourlon Wood the division added an acorn and two oak leaves on the diamond. This final version was issued as a cloth arm badge in late 1917 or early 1918.

Subformations of 40th Division adopted various coloured diamonds as their insignia. 119th Brigade used a diamond quartered in red, blue, yellow and green for HQ and brigade troops such as 119th MG Company and 119th TMB. However, the individual battalions within 119th Bde wore various coloured geometric shapes on the upper sleeve:

- 19th RWF: a horizontal rectangle bisected horizontally red over blue
- 12th SWB: a green horizontal rectangle
- 17th WR: a dark blue triangle
- 18th WR: a yellow tape across the base of the shoulder strap for ORs, at the top of the sleeve for officers

== World War II ==
119th Brigade was never reformed, but the number was used for deception purposes during World War II. 30th Battalion, Somerset Light Infantry, a line of communication unit serving in 43rd Brigade in Sicily and composed mainly of men below Medical Category 'A', was redesignated '119th Infantry Brigade' and acted as if it were a full brigade in an equally fictitious '40th Infantry Division' from November 1943 until April 1944.

== Memorial ==
40th Division's memorial is an altar in Bourlon Church dedicated on 27 May 1928 to those who died in Bourlon Wood in November 1917.
