= Richard John Andrews =

British Army officer

- Born: 8 December 1876; Stoke Newington, Middlesex, United Kingdom
- Died: 16 January 1923 (aged 46); Leyton, Essex, United Kingdom
- Military career
- Branch: British Army (c. 1900–1902, 1915–1920)
- Rank: Lieutenant colonel
- Units: Imperial Yeomanry (c. 1900–1902); 14th (London Scottish) battalion, London Regiment (1915); 1st (City of London) Battalion, London Regiment (1915–1916); 2nd Battalion, Devonshire Regiment (1916–1917); 18th Battalion, Welsh Regiment (1917–1918); 18th Battalion, York and Lancaster Regiment (1918); 13th Battalion, East Lancashire Regiment (1918–1919); North Russia Expeditionary Force (1919–1920)
- Conflicts: Second Boer War; First World War; Russian Civil War
- Awards: Distinguished Service Order; Military Cross

External media
- Imperial War Museum photograph Q71271 Andrews (seated in British Army uniform on the front row, holding a corner of the Union Flag) among a group of British Army and Royal Navy prisoners in Moscow, 1919/20.

Richard John Andrews DSO MC (8 December 1876 – 16 January 1923) was a British Army officer. After a brief career as a poulterer he enlisted in the 128th Company (Westminster Dragoons) of the Imperial Yeomanry for service in the Second Boer War (1899–1902), during which he was appointed lance sergeant. Andrews afterwards emigrated to Chile where he worked as a civil engineer for the Antofagasta and Bolivia Railway and claimed to have served as a captain in the Chilean Army. Andrews returned to Britain in 1915 and volunteered to join the British Army for service in the First World War. He enlisted in the 14th (London Scottish) Battalion of the London Regiment and reached the rank of sergeant. Andrews reverted to private upon transferring to the 1st (City of London) Battalion but in July 1915 had reached the rank of corporal by 19 March 1916 when he was selected for a commission and became a second lieutenant in the 2nd Battalion, Devonshire Regiment.

Andrews received the Military Cross in August 1916 and later that year was selected as one of the first men to attend the Senior Officers' School. After completing the course he was transferred to the 18th battalion of the Welsh Regiment. Andrews was commended by his brigade commander, Frank Percy Crozier for leading his battalion to capture Welsh Ridge, near Cambrai, on 24 April. Andrews was appointed to the Distinguished Service Order for actions two weeks later at La Vacquerie when he thwarted a German attack in the aftermath of a mine detonation. He was wounded in action in November 1917 at Bourlon Wood. Andrews returned to the frontline in the later stage of the war and led the 13th Battalion, East Lancashire Regiment in the Hundred Days Offensive.

Andrews appeared to suffer a breakdown in the post-war peace and was posted home to recover. He volunteered for service in the Allied intervention in the Russian Civil War against the Bolsheviks. He served as chief liaison officer with a White column in North Russia but was captured in July after the Russians mutinied. Andrews was senior British officer at the Butyrka prison in Moscow and became the last Briton to be released from captivity in April 1920. He left the army in October 1920 and, rather than return to Chile, joined the Auxiliary Division of the Royal Irish Constabulary, which was commanded by Crozier. He resigned from the unit in January 1921 and moved to London where he established an automobile garage. Andrews was killed when part of an abrasive wheel he was using in the garage struck him in the chest.

== Early life and career ==
Andrews was born in Stoke Newington (then a part of Middlesex) on 8 December 1876. (Note: Taylor 2016 p. 324 gives an 1887 birth year but this must be a typographical error as it disagrees with his Boer War service stated in the same paragraph.) He attended the City of London School and afterwards became a poulterer. During the Second Boer War (1899–1902) Andrews enlisted into the 128th Company (Westminster Dragoons) of the Imperial Yeomanry. He finished his service as a lance sergeant and received the Queen's South Africa Medal. After the war Andrews emigrated to Chile and worked as a civil engineer on the Antofagasta and Bolivia Railway. He also claimed to have served as a captain in the Chilean Army.

== First World War ==
=== Enlistment ===
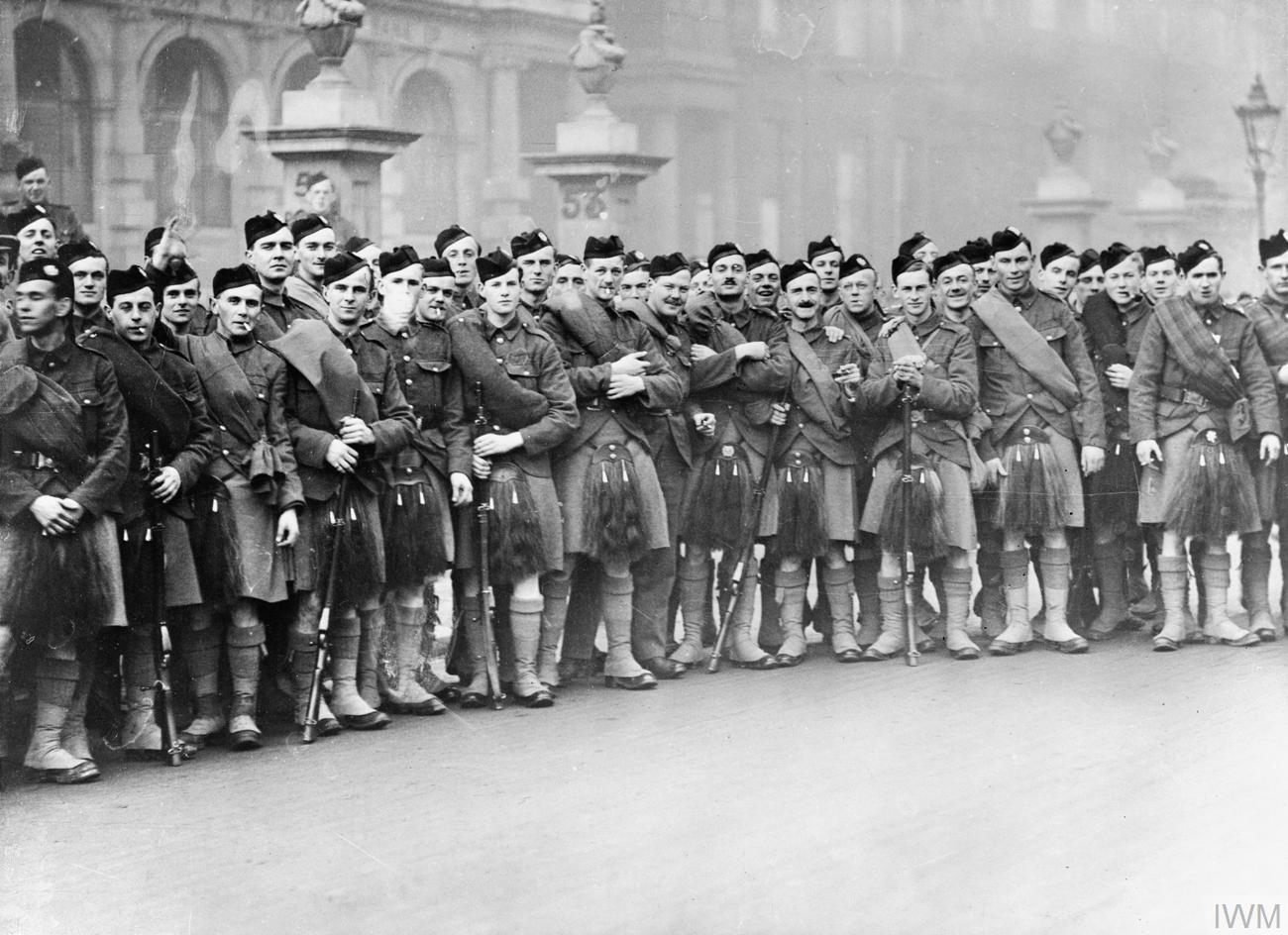
Soldiers of the 14th London Scottish in London, November 1914

After the outbreak of the First World War in 1914 Andrews returned to the United Kingdom, arriving at Liverpool on 13 January 1915. Five days later he enlisted in the 14th (London Scottish) Battalion of the London Regiment. Andrews reached the rank of sergeant in the battalion but reverted to private when he was transferred to the regiment's 1st (City of London) Battalion after arrival in France in July 1915. Andrews reached the rank of corporal again before being selected to receive a commission. He transferred to the 2nd Battalion of the Devonshire Regiment as a temporary second lieutenant on 19 March 1916. Andrews was appointed to the acting rank of captain from 2 July 1916, while he held command of a company. He received the Military Cross in August 1916.

=== Welsh Regiment ===
Andrews was selected as one of the first officers to attend the Senior Officers' School in late 1916; it was intended to provide training to future battalion commanders. Upon completion of the course he was appointed second-in-command of the 18th Battalion of the Welsh Regiment on 18 April 1917. In this role he held the acting rank of major but was still only a temporary second lieutenant. On 24 April he led the battalion in the capture of Welsh Ridge, near Cambrai. The commander of his brigade (the 119th Brigade) Brigadier General Frank Percy Crozier noted Andrews' abilities in the action, remarking that "there is no holding these intrepid men". Crozier recommended Andrews for the Distinguished Service Order (DSO) for this action but it was not approved.

Andrews received the DSO for actions at La Vacquerie just two weeks after Welsh Ridge. The citation for the medal reads:

For conspicuous gallantry. When the enemy exploded a mine, filling in a sap and damaging our front line, he at once led forward a party, drove off the enemy, and held off the near lip of the crater.

At the time Andrews held temporary command of the brigade, despite holding only the temporary rank of second lieutenant and acting rank of major. Despite being wounded in the foot early in the action he took control of the situation, organising a successful retreat and personally supervising the withdrawal of the last platoon and seeing to the safety of the wounded. Andrews afterwards led a counterattack to drive back a party of Germans and took possession of the rear lip of the mine crater as a new defensive position.

Andrews was promoted to the temporary rank of major on 1 July 1917. He was appointed an acting lieutenant-colonel, commanding his battalion, on 11 July, being promoted to the temporary rank on 18 October, with his seniority backdated to 11 July. Andrews led the 17th Welsh into action at Bourlon Wood in November 1917, during the Battle of Cambrai. He was wounded in the right buttock, damaging his sciatic nerve. Andrews received the French Croix de Guerre with palm leaves for his actions at Bourlon Wood.

=== East Lancashire Regiment ===
Andrews was sent to England for nine months to convalesce. In June 1918 he was appointed to command the 18th Battalion of the York and Lancaster Regiment on home service but soon returned to the Western Front, still limping from his wound. Andrews was supposed to report to army headquarters but reported unofficially to Crozier first. Crozier immediately appointed him to command the 13th Battalion of the East Lancashire Regiment, the 17th Welsh having been disbanded. Headquarters complained but permitted Crozier, who had lamented the quality of available battalion commanders, to retain Andrews. Crozier noted that he welcomed the return of his "old fire-eating Andrews". Andrews led the battalion over the River Scheldt on 8 November, as the war was drawing to a close. He led his men from the front encouraging them to "allez, allez" ("go, go" in French).

Andrews remained in the army in 1919 but seems to have suffered from a breakdown. He announced to his battalion the low opinion he held of the educational training they were receiving and of the division's general who had ordered it. This matter was reported to Crozier but Andrews learnt of this and rounded on his officers, demanding to know who had reported him. He was disarmed and arrested. Crozier arranged to resolve the matter tactfully in discussion with the commander of the hospital where Andrews was detained. He was relieved of command on 25 December and left for Britain on 31 December as being "sick, post influenza".

== Russia ==
Andrews volunteered to serve with the British Army as part of the Allied intervention in the Russian Civil War against the Bolsheviks. He was posted to the North Russian Expeditionary Force as chief liaison officer with the White Russian Onega river column. Andrews assumed this appointment in April 1919 but was taken prisoner in July, alongside other British and White Russian officers, when the 5th North Russian Rifles mutinied and joined the Bolsheviks. Andrews saved the lives of his officers from summary execution by pretending to be a Labour Party leader.

Andrews was held prisoner at the Butyrka prison in Moscow and was the senior British officer there. He protested against being held under armed guard as he had given his parole. He threatened to withdraw his parole if the guards were not removed. Andrews became the last captive Briton to be released from Bolshevik captivity in April 1920.

== Ireland ==
Andrews relinquished his British Army commission in October 1920. He was entitled to repatriation to Chile at the army's expense and had a ticket for a passage to South America. However Andrews heard that Crozier had been appointed to command the Auxiliary Division of the Royal Irish Constabulary, cancelled his ticket and travelled to Ireland. Andrews was appointed to command the Auxiliary Division's G Company. During this period Ireland was moving towards partition, amid the Irish War of Independence. Andrews seems to have taken a hard stance in Ireland and described his approach as "the only way we will beat these bastards is to fight fire with fire. We will be fair where we can but as the IRA does not adhere to any principles of war, neither can we".

Andrews' G company was implicated in the killing of four Irishmen at the Killaloe Bridge in November 1920. Andrews resigned from the unit in January 1921, at around the same time as Crozier left. After his departure, financial irregularities were discovered in the G Company accounts, with some £2,000 unaccounted for.

== Return to London ==
Andrews returned to London after leaving Ireland, taking up residence in Hampstead. Andrews was appointed a freeman of the City of London in recognition of his army service, and received a sword of honour and Sam Browne belt from his fellow freemen. Andrews also served as president of the 17th Welch Old Comrades' Association (the Welsh Regiment had been renamed to use the antiquated spelling "Welch" in 1920) and was a member of the battle honours committees of the Welch and the East Lancashire Regiments. He was also a Freemason.

Andrews established, with Crozier, the Ex-Officers' Automobile Service, possibly with money from their army demobilisation gratuities. The company carried out repairs, bought and sold cars and sold insurance. It maintained two premises, an office and works near Euston Station and a garage at Leyton. Crozier was chairman and director and Andrews was general manager.

Andrews died at the garage on 16 January 1923. He was sharpening a chisel on an electric-powered abrasive wheel when it broke and a piece of the wheel struck him in the chest, rupturing his heart. The owner of a neighbouring engineering business had heard the motor start and then a loud thud; upon investigating he found Andrews lying next to the wheel with the chisel still clasped in his hand. A Home Office inspector found the wheel had been improperly mounted, the coroner recorded a verdict of death by misadventure.

Andrews' death led to the closure of the Ex-Officers' Automobile Service. He left an estate valued at £1,239 and 15 shillings (equivalent to £64,817 in 2025). He left a shilling to each of his four sisters and the remainder of his estate to an Edith Ricketts "for her faithful and devoted friendship".
