= Arthur Granville Soames =

British army officer

Arthur Granville Soames OBE
- Born: 12 October 1886; Wingerworth, Derbyshire, England, United Kingdom
- Died: 6 July 1962 (aged 75); London
- Spouses: Hope Mary Woodbine Parish (m. 1913; div. 1934) Annette Constance Jardine (m. 1934) Audrey Alma Sloane-Stanley (m. 1948)
- Children: 3, including Christopher

Captain Arthur Granville Soames (12 October 1886 – 6 July 1962) was a British Army officer in the Coldstream Guards and landowner.

== Early life ==
He was born on 12 October 1886 in Wingerworth, Derbyshire, England. He was the only son of Harold Soames (1855–1918), brewer, later of Gray Rigg, Lilliput, Dorset.

Soames's mother was Katherine Mary (1851–1932), a daughter of George Hill.

Soames was the younger brother of Auriol Soames, and the elder brother of Olave St. Clair Baden-Powell, nee Soames (1889–1977), World Chief Guide.

On Christmas night 1918, his father, Harold Soames, walked into the sea at Lilliput, Poole. Four months later his sister Auriol Edith Davidson threw herself under a train at Cheshunt, Hertfordshire, on 5 April 1919; she was survived by her three small daughters, aged five, three, and three months.

== Career ==
Soames was educated at Eton and the Royal Military College, Sandhurst, and was commissioned as a Second lieutenant into the Coldstream Guards on 16 August 1905. He was promoted to Lieutenant on 21 September 1907, and was appointed adjutant of the Guards Depot in September 1913.

On 25 August 1914, soon after the outbreak of the First World War, Soames was appointed staff captain in the 4th (Guards) Brigade and served on the staff throughout the war. He was wounded during the Battle of the Aisne and returned to Britain. He was promoted to Captain in February 1915 and appointed Brigade major of 119th Brigade (the Welsh Bantam Brigade) on 25 October 1915. He compiled the Standing Orders for War, 119th Infantry Brigade. The brigade went to the Western Front as part of 40th Division in June 1916. Soames was still in this post in November 1916 when 119th Bde received a new commander, Brigadier-General Frank Percy Crozier. Soames made the mistake of telling the new commander that a full kit inspection of the brigade would be 'most inconvenient'; Crozier removed Soames, sending him on a course on 9 December, and he did not return to 119th Bde. Later he served as a General Staff Officer Grade 2, and as Brigade Major of 2nd Reserve Brigade. After the war he was awarded an OBE in June 1919 and retired from the army on the grounds of ill-health in December 1919.

In November 1926, Soames was nominated as Sheriff of Buckinghamshire, and was then living at Ashwell Manor, Tylers Green, Buckinghamshire. He was nominated again the following year.

== Personal life ==
On 20 December 1913 at the Guards' Chapel, Wellington Barracks, Soames married Hope Mary Woodbine Parish (b. 2 Aug 1893 in Westminster), daughter of businessman Charles Woodbine Parish, of Ennismore Gardens, Kensington. Together, they had two daughters and a son:

- Sanchia Mary (Bunty) Soames (21 Sept 1914 – 1 Jan 1953)
- Diana Katherine (Dido) Soames (24 Sept 1917 – 4 Feb 1997), m. 1939 Lt.Col. Hugh William Cairns, M.C.
- (Arthur) Christopher (John) Soames (12 Oct 1920 – Sept 1987) who married Mary, daughter of Winston Churchill

They divorced in 1934. Arthur Soames remarried twice:

- On 23 Oct 1934 in London to Annette Constance Jardine née Fraser (b. Sep 1876, East Grinstead, Sussex)
- On 16 Mar 1948 in Westminster to Audrey Alma nee Humphreys (16 July 1900 – 1990). In Q1 1923 in Reading she had married Vernon H Rivers, but they divorced, and he married again, in 1934 and in 1943. In Q2 1937 in Westminster she had married Ronald F A Sloane-Stanley, who died on the Isle of Wight in Q3 1948, aged 80.

In 1934, Soames inherited the mansion and estate of Sheffield Park, Sussex, from his father's brother, Arthur Gilstrap Soames, who had purchased it in 1909. Soames sold the estate in 1953. He also disposed of part of his library.

He died in a London hospital on 6 July 1962 aged 75.
