= Arthur Soames =

Arthur Soames may refer to:

- Christopher Soames (Arthur Christopher John Soames, 1920–1987), British Conservative politician
- Arthur Wellesley Soames (1852–1934), British Liberal politician and architect
- Arthur Granville Soames (1886–1962), member of HM's Coldstream Guards
