= Goodliffe =

Goodliffe is a surname. Notable people with the surname include:

- Ben Goodliffe (born 1999), professional footballer at Sutton United
- Guy Goodliffe (1883-1963), cricketer and British Army officer
- Mark Goodliffe, English puzzler, co-founder of the YouTube channel Cracking the Cryptic
- Michael Goodliffe (1914-1976), English actor

== See also ==
- Goodliffe's Abracadabra, a British weekly magic magazine 1946-2009
