= Guy Goodliffe =

English cricketer and British Army officer

Personal information
- Full name: Guy Vernon Goodliffe
- Born: 17 September 1883; Kensington, London, England
- Died: 29 May 1963 (aged 79); Derry, County Londonderry, Northern Ireland

Domestic team information
- Years: Team
- 1904: Oxford University
- 1901–1907: Berkshire

Career statistics
Competition	First-class
Matches	1
Runs scored	0
Batting average	0.00
100s/50s	–/–
Top score	0
Balls bowled	54
Wickets	2
Bowling average	10.50
5 wickets in innings	–
10 wickets in match	–
Best bowling	1/0
Catches/stumpings	1/–
- Source: Cricinfo, 25 November 2011

Major Guy Vernon Goodliffe OBE MC (17 September 1883 – 29 May 1963) was a career officer in the British Army and an English cricketer. Goodliffe's batting and bowling styles are unknown. He was born at Kensington, London and was educated at Charterhouse School.

== Cricket ==
Goodliffe made his debut for Berkshire in the 1901 Minor Counties Championship against Buckinghamshire. Later, while studying at the University of Oxford, Goodliffe made a single first-class appearance for Oxford University Cricket Club against Somerset at University Parks in 1904. During this match, he was dismissed for a duck by Talbot Lewis in Oxford University's first-innings. He took two wickets during the match, those of George Barne in Somerset's first-innings, and Gerard Hodgkinson in their second-innings, with Oxford University winning by an innings and 45 runs. This was his only first-class appearance for the university. He also played football for the university in 1902–3. He continued to play cricket for Berkshire during this period, with him playing for the county until 1907. He made a total of ten Minor Counties Championship appearances.

== Military career ==
Having been on the Unattached List for Auxiliary Forces in 1906, during which he was granted the rank of 2nd Lieutenant, Goodliffe joined the Royal Fusiliers in 1907. He served with 1st Battalion, Royal Fusiliers, in the early part of World War I and was promoted to Captain in December 1914, and by August 1916 he was an Acting Major. The following year he relinquished his rank of Acting Major and reverted to captain. By this point he had been awarded the Military Cross. On 18 February 1917 he joined 119th Brigade (the Welsh Bantam Brigade) as Brigade major under Brigadier-General Frank Percy Crozier. He served with the brigade during the fighting in front of the Hindenburg Line in April and the capture of Bourlon Wood during the Battle of Cambrai in November that year. Crozier sent Goodliffe on a six-month staff course at Cambridge University in December 1917 and he officially relinquished his position of brigade major on 4 April 1918 when he was appointed General Staff Officer Grade 2 at the Headquarters of VIII Corps, with the rank of Temporary Major. He was Mentioned in dispatches in December 1917 and May 1918.

After the war, he became a Brevet Major in the Reserve of Officers, but was restored to the army establishment in February 1920 before becoming an instructor of English at French military schools for three years from November 1920. In 1926, he was seconded for duty as an officer of a Company of Gentlemen Cadets at the Royal Military College, Sandhurst. His appointment to the college was relinquished in September 1930, and he retired from active duty in that same month. Upon retirement he was granted the rank of Major.

== Retirement ==
In retirement he took up farming at Birdstown in County Donegal, Northern Ireland. On the outbreak of World War II his experience was called upon when he was re-commissioned as a major in the Royal Artillery. He was appointed as a military member of the County Antrim Territorial Army and Air Force Association in November 1939, and served as Lieutenant-Colonel commanding the Army Cadet Force in Derry 1943–47. He retired for a second time in July 1948 from the Territorial Army Reserve of Officers having exceeded the age limit.

He died on 29 May 1963 at Derry, County Londonderry.
