= Bienvillers-au-Bois =

- Commune
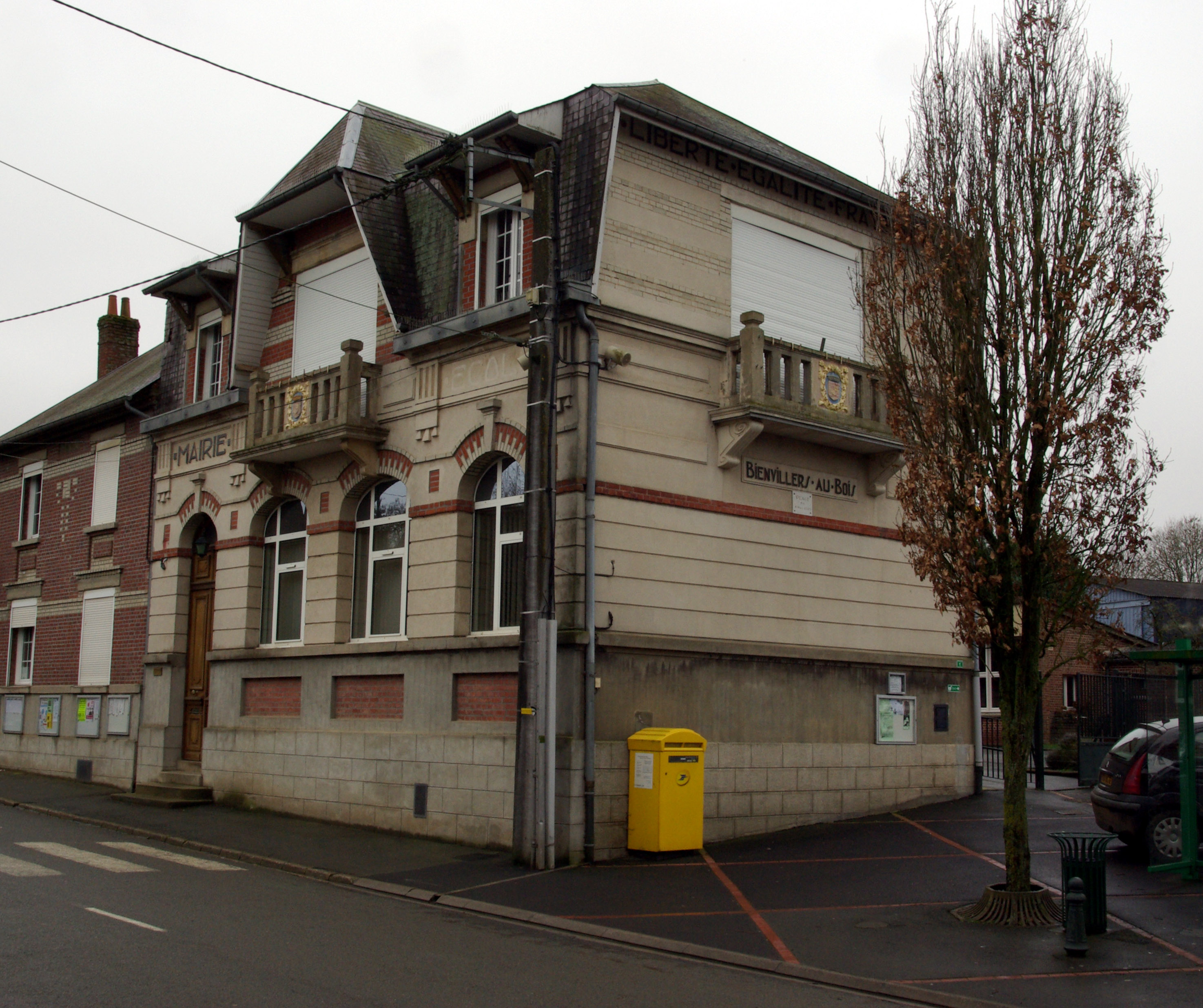
- The town hall of Bienvillers-au-Bois

- Coat of arms
- Location of Bienvillers-au-Bois
- Location within France Location within Hauts-de-France
- Coordinates: 50°10′27″N 2°37′08″E
- Country: France
- Region: Hauts-de-France
- Department: Pas-de-Calais
- Arrondissement: Arras
- Canton: Avesnes-le-Comte
- Intercommunality: CC Campagnes de l'Artois

Government
  - Mayor (2022–2026): Patrick Nepveu
- Area^{1}: 7.39 km^{2} (2.85 sq mi)
- Elevation: 156 m (512 ft)
- Highest elevation: 167 m (548 ft)
- Lowest elevation: 140 m (460 ft)
- Population (2023): 671
  - Density: 90.8/km^{2} (235/sq mi)
- Time zone: UTC+01:00 (CET)
  - Summer (DST): UTC+02:00 (CEST)
- INSEE/Postal code: 62130 /62111
- ^{1} French Land Register data, which excludes lakes, ponds, glaciers > 1 km^{2} (0.386 sq mi or 247 acres) and river estuaries.

Bienvillers-au-Bois (French pronunciation: [bjɛ̃vile o bwa]; Picard: Binvilèr-au-Bos) is a commune in the Pas-de-Calais department in the Hauts-de-France region in northern France.

== Geography ==
A farming and light industrial village located 11 miles (18 km) southwest of Arras at the junction of the D2, D8 and D62.

== Population ==
Historical population
| Year | Pop. | ±% p.a. |
|---|---|---|
| 1968 | 629 | — |
| 1975 | 665 | +0.80% |
| 1982 | 584 | −1.84% |
| 1990 | 614 | +0.63% |
| 1999 | 619 | +0.09% |
| 2007 | 604 | −0.31% |
| 2012 | 633 | +0.94% |
| 2017 | 643 | +0.31% |
| 2023 | 671 | +0.71% |
Source: INSEE

== Sights ==
- The church of St. Jacques, dating from the thirteenth century.
- The war memorial.
- The Commonwealth War Graves Commission cemetery.

== See also ==
- Communes of the Pas-de-Calais department
