= 40th Division (United Kingdom) =

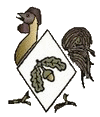
- First World War division insignia showing a bantam referencing the division's original bantam nature. Used on sign boards and worn on the uniform.
- Active: 1915–1918; 1943–1944; 1949–?
- Country: United Kingdom
- Branch: British Army
- Type: Infantry
- Size: Division
- Engagements: Western Front (World War I) Battle of the Somme Battle of Cambrai (1917) First Battle of the Somme (1918) Battle of the Lys (1918) Hundred Days Offensive

Commanders
- Notable commanders: Major-General H.G. Ruggles-Brise

The 40th Division was an infantry division of the British Army active during the First World War, where it served on the Western Front. It was a division of Lord Kitchener's New Army volunteers, mostly "bantam" recruits of below regulation height. It was later briefly reformed as a deception formation in the Second World War, and during the early years of the Cold War was recreated a third time to garrison Hong Kong.

== History ==
=== First World War ===
The 40th Division was originally formed during the First World War as a Kitchener's Army 'bantam' division of Kitchener's Army between September and December 1915. 'Bantam' personnel were those who were under the British Army's regulation height but otherwise fit for service. It comprised the 119th, 120th, and 121st infantry brigades along with various supporting units. The division, commanded by Major General Harold Ruggles-Brise, having by now completed its training, moved to the Western Front, the main theatre of war, in June 1916 and served there throughout the rest of the conflict.

The most notable action of the division may be its participation in the Battle of Cambrai in November 1917. By 22 November the British were left exposed in a salient on the battlefield. Field Marshal Sir Douglas Haig, commander-in-chief (C-in-C) of the British Expeditionary Force (BEF) on the Western Front, wanted Bourlon Ridge and the exhausted 62nd (2nd West Riding) Division was replaced by the 40th Division, now commanded by Major General John Ponsonby, on 23 November. Supported by almost a hundred tanks and 430 guns, the 40th attacked into the woods of Bourlon Ridge on the morning of the 23rd. They made little progress. The Germans had put two divisions of Gruppe Arras on the ridge with another two in reserve and Gruppe Caudry was reinforced. The 40th Division reached the crest of the ridge but were held there and suffered over 4,000 casualties for their efforts in three days. The division was subsequently driven back in the German counterattacks, suffering many more losses.

From July 1918 until March 1919, the division was led by Major General Sir William Peyton and took part in the Hundred Days advance through Flanders until the Armistice with Germany on 11 November brought the war to an end.

==== Order of Battle ====
The following units served with the division:

119th Brigade

(This brigade was often known as the Welsh Bantam Brigade, until February 1918.)

- 19th (Service) Battalion, Royal Welsh Fusiliers (disbanded February 1918)
- 12th (Service) Battalion, South Wales Borderers (3rd Gwent) (disbanded February 1918)
- 17th (Service) Battalion, Welsh Regiment (1st Glamorgan) (disbanded February 1918)
- 18th (Service) Battalion, Welsh Regiment (2nd Glamorgan) (joined July 1915. Reduced to cadre in May 1918 and left brigade 18 June 1918)
- 13th (Service) Battalion, East Surrey Regiment (Wandsworth) (joined from 120th Brigade February 1918, left as cadre June 1918)
- 21st (Service) Battalion, Middlesex Regiment (Islington) (joined from 121st Brigade February 1918, left as cadre May 1918)
- 10/11th (Service) Battalion, Highland Light Infantry (joined and left February 1918)
- 13th (Service) Battalion, Royal Inniskilling Fusiliers (converted from 13th Garrison Battalion and joined in June 1918)
- 13th (Service) Battalion, East Lancashire Regiment (converted from 8th Garrison Guard Battalion and joined in June 1918)
- 12th (Service) Battalion, North Staffordshire Regiment (converted from 12th Garrison Battalion and joined in June 1918)
- 119th Machine Gun Company (joined 19 June 1916, moved to 40th Battalion Machine Gun Corps (M.G.C.) March 1918)
- 119th Trench Mortar Battery (formed 25 June 1916)

120th Brigade

- 11th (Service) Battalion, King's Own Royal Regiment (Lancaster) (disbanded February 1918)
- 13th (Service) Battalion, Cameronians (Scottish Rifles) (left February 1916)
- 14th (Service) Battalion, Highland Light Infantry (left as a cadre June 1918)
- 13th (Service) Battalion (Wandsworth), East Surrey Regiment (joined February 1916, left for 119th Brigade February 1918)
- 14th (Service) Battalion, Argyll and Sutherland Highlanders (left April 1918)
- 12th (Service) Battalion, South Lancashire Regiment (joined January 1916, absorbed into 11th King’s Own March 1916)
- 10/11th (Service) Battalion, Highland Light Infantry (joined February 1918, left as cadre June 1918)
- 2nd Battalion, Royal Scots Fusiliers (joined and left April 1918)
- 10th (Service) Battalion, King’s Own Scottish Borderers (joined June 1918)
- 15th (Service) Battalion, Yorkshire Light Infantry (joined June 1918)
- 11th (Service) Battalion, Queen's Own Cameron Highlanders (converted from 6th Garrison Guard Battalion and joined June 1918)
- 120th Machine Gun Company (joined 19 June 1916, moved to 40th Battalion M.G.C. March 1918)
- 120th Trench Mortar Battery (joined 8 June 1916)

121st Brigade

- 12th (Service) Battalion, Suffolk Regiment (East Anglian) (left as cadre May 1918)
- 13th (Service) Battalion, Green Howards (left as cadre June 1918)
- 18th (Service) Battalion, Sherwood Foresters (merged with 13th Green Howards April 1916)
- 22nd (Service) Battalion, Middlesex Regiment (merged with 12th Suffolks April 1916)
- 20th (Service) Battalion, Middlesex Regiment (Shoreditch) (joined 23 February 1916, left as cadre May 1918)
- 21st (Service) Battalion, Middlesex Regiment (Islington) (joined 23 February 1916, left for 119th Brigade February 1918)
- 8th (Service) Battalion, Royal Irish Regiment (converted from 8th Garrison Battalion and joined June 1918)
- 23rd (Service) Battalion, Lancashire Fusiliers (converted from 23rd Garrison Battalion and joined June 1918)
- 23rd Battalion, Cheshire Regiment (joined June 1918)
- 9th (Service) Battalion, Worcestershire Regiment (joined as cadre June 1918, absorbed July 1918)
- 121st Machine Gun Company (joined 19 June 1916, moved to 40th Battalion M.G.C. March 1918)
- 121st Trench Mortar Battery (joined 25 June 1916)

Divisional Troops

- 12th (Service) Battalion, Green Howards (divisional pioneers, left June 1918)
- 17th (Service) Battalion, Worcestershire Regiment (divisional pioneers, joined June 1918)
- 244th Machine Gun Company (joined July 1917, moved to 40th Battalion M.G.C. March 1918)
- 40th Battalion M.G.C. (formed March 1918, disbanded May 1918)
- 104th Battalion M.G.C. (formed 24 August 1918, left 16 September 1918)
- 39th Battalion M.G.C. (joined 11 September 1918)
- Divisional Mounted Troops
  - A Sqn, Royal Wiltshire Yeomanry (left 20 June 1916)
  - 40th Divisional Cyclist Company, Army Cyclist Corps (left 11 June 1916)
- 40th Divisional Train Army Service Corps
  - 225th, 226th, 227th, 228th Companies (joined November 1915, left by April 1916)
  - 292nd, 293rd, 294th and 295th Companies (joined by April 1916)
- 51st Mobile Veterinary Section Army Veterinary Corps
- 237th Divisional Employment Company (joined April 1917)

Royal Artillery

- CLXXVIII (East Ham) (Howitzer) Brigade, Royal Field Artillery (R.F.A.)
- CLXXXI (Ashton) Brigade, R.F.A.
- CLXXXV (Tottenham) Brigade, R.F.A. (broken up 31 August 1916)
- CLXXXVIII (Nottingham) Brigade, R.F.A. (broken up 1 September 1916)
- 40th (Hammersmith) Divisional Ammunition Column R.F.A.
- V.40 Heavy Trench Mortar Battery, R.F.A. (formed 4 July 1916; broken up 7 March 1918)
- X.40, Y.40 and Z.40 Medium Mortar Batteries, R.F.A. (formed 25 June 1916, Z broken up on 7 March 1918 and distributed among X and Y batteries)

Royal Engineers

- 224th (Doncaster) Field Company
- 229th (Doncaster) Field Company
- 231st (Doncaster) Field Company
- 40th Divisional Signals Company

Royal Army Medical Corps

- 135th Field Ambulance
- 136th Field Ambulance
- 137th Field Ambulance
- 83rd Sanitary Section (left April 1917)

=== Second World War ===
40th Infantry Division sign, Second World War (deception)

The 40th Infantry Division was notionally created on 9 November 1943 as part of Operation Foynes. Operation Foynes was a deception plan to "conceal from the Germans the weakening of the allied position in the Mediterranean". To aid in the build-up for Operation Overlord, eight veteran British and American divisions were withdrawn to the United Kingdom. They were replaced by three genuine divisions. To cover the shortfall, four phantom divisions were created in the theatre and a further two were "held in readiness to be "sent" but were never used".

To recreate the 40th Division, the 43rd Infantry Brigade, formed for internal security duties in the Lines of Communication of AFHQ, was renamed as a division, for deception purposes, with the battalions playing the role of brigades.

==== Order of Battle ====
- Brigadier G H P Whitfield (given local rank of Major General)
  - 30th battalion, Somerset Light Infantry (119th Brigade)
  - 30th battalion, Royal Norfolk Regiment (120th Brigade)
  - 30th battalion, Dorset Regiment (121st Brigade)

To keep up appearances, the battalion commanding officers flew brigadier pennants, and a divisional insignia adapted from the First World War's 40th Division was adopted and worn (these were manufactured locally). The deception was played out until June 1944, when the formation was disbanded.

=== Post war ===
Post World War II 40th Division formation sign

Following the increasing success of the Communists in the Chinese Civil War, the 40th Division was reformed to bolster the defences of Hong Kong in 1949 under the command of Major-General G.C. Evans. In Hong Kong the Division comprised the 26th Gurkha, 27th and 28th Infantry Brigades, and 3rd Royal Tank Regiment. However the 27th Brigade was soon dispatched to Korea in August 1950, and followed by other units of the division. The Division was later disbanded.

== General Officer Commanding ==
- Major-General H.G. Ruggles-Brise 1915 – 1917
- Major-General John Ponsonby 1917 – 1918
- Major-General Sir William Peyton 1918 – March 1919
- Major-General G.C. Evans 1949 – 1950

== See also ==
- List of British divisions in World War I
- List of British divisions in World War II

== Sources ==
- Chappell, Mike (1987). British Battle Insignia (2): 1939-45 Osprey ISBN 978-0850457391
- Grey, Jeffrey (1988). The Commonwealth Armies and the Korean War: An Alliance Study. Manchester University Press. ISBN 978-0719026119.
- Holt, Thaddeus. (2005) The Deceivers: Allied Military Deception in the Second World War. Phoenix. ISBN 0-753-81-917-1
- Whitton, F. E. (1926). History of the 40th Division. Aldershot: Gale & Polden. OCLC 6076710.
