= Whitchurch (Tilstock) Airfield =

Airfield in Shropshire, England

Coordinates: 52.931°N 2.651°W

Whitchurch (Tilstock) Airport
- IATA: None; ICAO: EGCT

Summary
- Airport type: Private
- Operator: R L Matson & Son
- Location: Tilstock, Shropshire, England
- Elevation AMSL: 301 ft / 92 m
- Website: http://www.skydivetilstock.co.uk

Map
- Location in Shropshire

Runways
Direction	Length		Surface
Direction	m	ft	Surface
14/32	600	1,969	Concrete
- Source: Pooley's Flight Guide

Whitchurch (Tilstock) Airfield is an airfield located in Shropshire, England, close to the village of Prees and 2 miles (3.2 km) east of the village of Tilstock and 3 miles (4.8 km) south of Whitchurch, near the junction of the A41 and A49.

== Prees Heath Army Camp ==
Opened in 1915 as a training base for the British Army, it had a capacity for 30,000 men for training in trench warfare. It additionally acted later as a store for supplies, with its own railway depot fed by a 1 mile (1.6 km) branch line from the LNWR's Crewe and Shrewsbury Railway. As casualties mounted, it became a hospital with a fully fledged barracks.

The scale and size of the camp brought about the appointment of the first female police officers in the Shropshire Constabulary, to manage and restrain local women from heading to the camp.

After the war ended, the facilities were downgraded, with the British Government keeping ownership of the site for Army training purposes.

== Prees Heath internment camp ==
At the outbreak of the Second World War in 1939, the site became an internment camp for screening Austrian and German refugees, with capacity added for holding 2,000 men by the erection of a large tented village. Later converted to a prisoner of war camp, it closed on 4 October 1941.

== RAF Tilstock ==
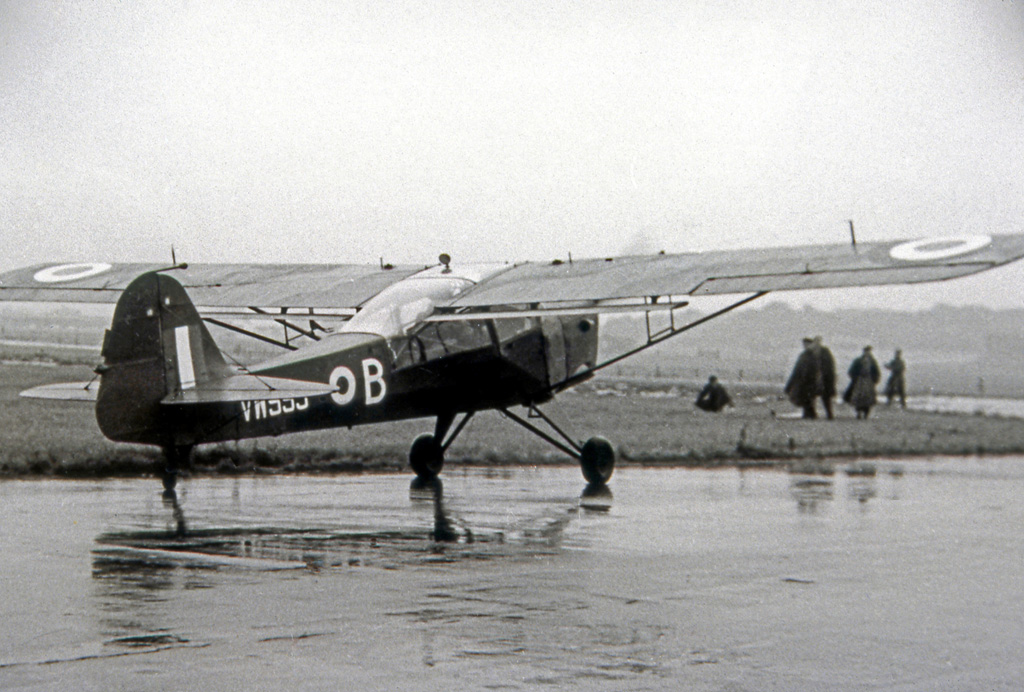
Tilstock airfield in 1952 with an Auster AOP.6 of 663 (AOP) Squadron Royal Air Force on a weekend exercise

Construction of an airfield was completed by mid-1942, the airfield opening on 1 August that year, with a classic three concrete runway RAF "star" arrangement. The name "Whitchurch Heath" was used until 1 June 1943, when RAF Tilstock was adopted. Between 1 September 1942 and 21 January 1946, the airfield was used by No. 81 Operational Training Unit and No. 1665 Heavy Conversion Unit Royal Air Force for the training of pilots and crews in the operation of Whitley, Stirling and Halifax heavy bombers. During the 1950s, Auster AOP.6 and Auster T.7 'spotter' aircraft of No. 663 (AOP) Squadron RAF used the facilities of the otherwise non-operational airfield during weekends for liaison flights with Royal Artillery units on training exercises.

== Sport parachuting ==
In 1964, it was home to the Manchester Skydivers.

In 1967, it became Manchester Free Fall Club (MFFC), run by the ex-paratroopers. Over the next three decades the club was run as a local members' club at weekends with a mixture of regular club jumpers and first time jumpers keen to experience sport parachuting and often to raise funds for charity. There were a number of local affiliations with universities and polytechnics. The mainstay aircraft were a number of Cessna 172s and 182s. In the 1990s, the club was taken over and run on a more commercial basis, but due to local disputes over noise and some financial difficulties the regularity of flying days declined. It is now Skydive Tilstock Freefall Club which is a non-profit making sports club and a company limited by guarantee. It uses a Cessna 208 Grand Caravan with a maximum capacity of 16 people including the crew.

== Today ==
The airfield is unlicensed. The remaining runway is designated 14/32. A large part of the site is now occupied by a solar farm.
