= Fosseux =

- Commune
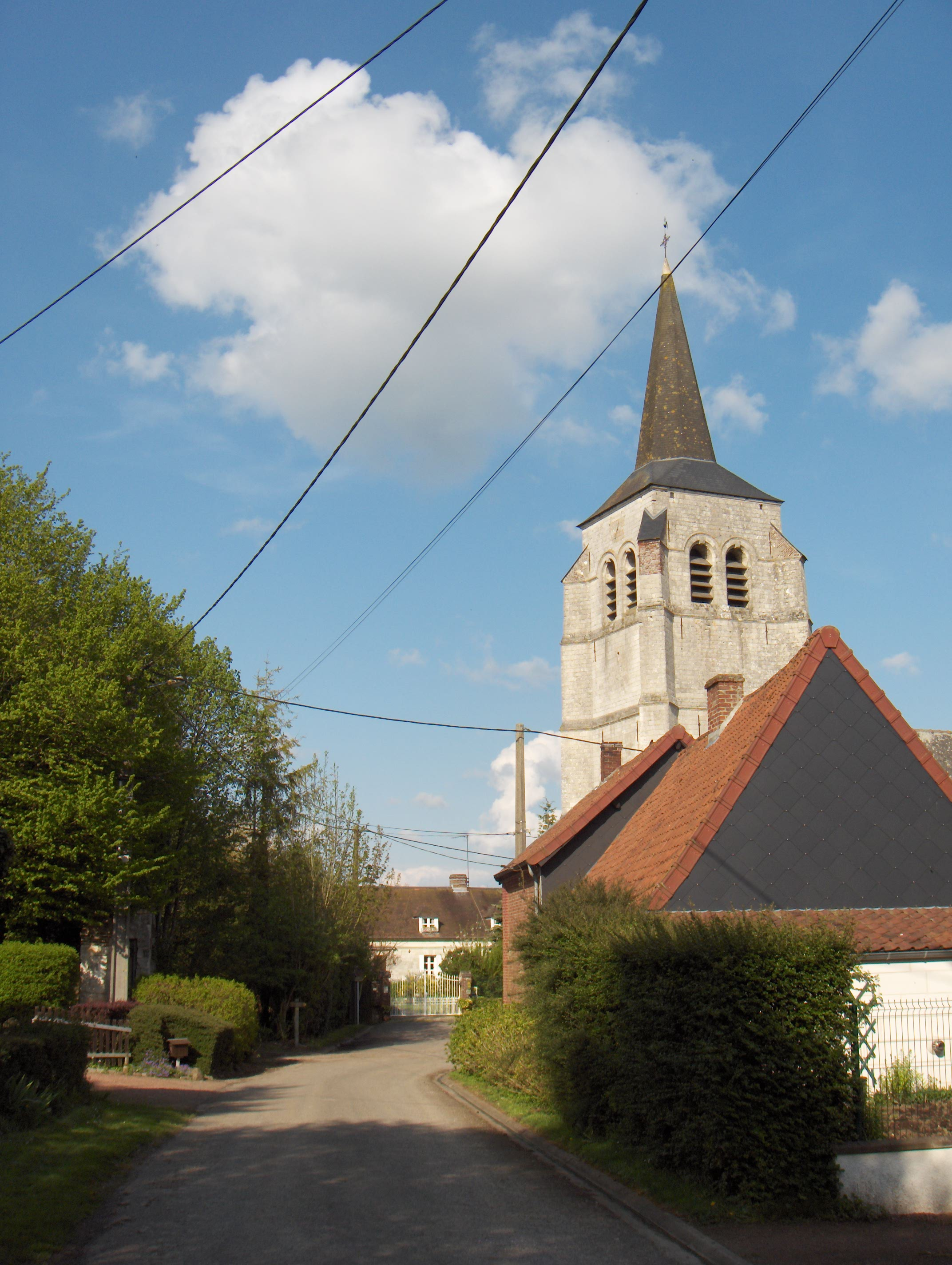
- The tower of the church of Fosseux

- Coat of arms
- Location of Fosseux
- Location within France Location within Hauts-de-France
- Coordinates: 50°15′24″N 2°33′52″E
- Country: France
- Region: Hauts-de-France
- Department: Pas-de-Calais
- Arrondissement: Arras
- Canton: Avesnes-le-Comte
- Intercommunality: CC Campagnes de l'Artois

Government
  - Mayor (2020–2026): Jean Michel Delannoy
- Area^{1}: 5.43 km^{2} (2.10 sq mi)
- Elevation: 134 m (440 ft)
- Highest elevation: 161 m (528 ft)
- Lowest elevation: 96 m (315 ft)
- Population (2023): 119
  - Density: 21.9/km^{2} (56.8/sq mi)
- Time zone: UTC+01:00 (CET)
  - Summer (DST): UTC+02:00 (CEST)
- INSEE/Postal code: 62347 /62810
- ^{1} French Land Register data, which excludes lakes, ponds, glaciers > 1 km^{2} (0.386 sq mi or 247 acres) and river estuaries.

Fosseux (French pronunciation: [fosø]) is a commune in the Pas-de-Calais department in the Hauts-de-France region of France.

== Geography ==
A small farming village situated 12 miles (19 km) southwest of Arras, at the junction of the D59 and the D66 roads.

== Population ==
Historical population
Year	Pop.	±% p.a.
1968	143	—
1975	136	−0.71%
1982	134	−0.21%
1990	146	+1.08%
1999	143	−0.23%
2007	136	−0.63%
2012	141	+0.72%
2017	136	−0.72%
2023	119	−2.20%
Source: INSEE

== Places of interest ==
- The church of St.Nicholas, dating from the seventeenth century.
- The eighteenth-century chateau.
- Traces of an old castle.
- A 400-year-old tree.

== See also ==
- Communes of the Pas-de-Calais department
