= Frank Percy Crozier =

British Army officer (1879–1937)

Brigadier-General Frank Percy Crozier CB CMG DSO
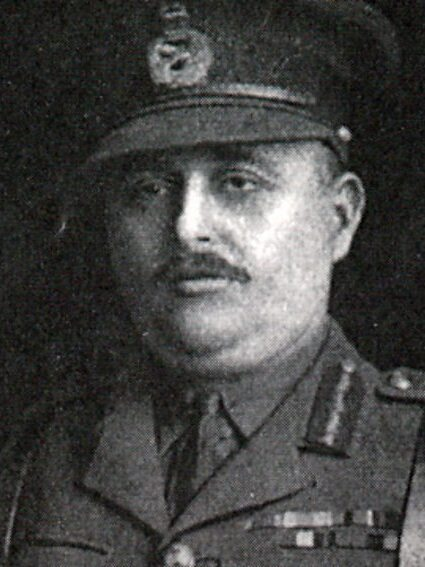
- Crozier in 1916
- Born: 1 January 1879; Bermuda
- Died: 31 August 1937 (aged 58); London, England
- Military career
- Allegiance: United Kingdom
- Branch: British Army
- Service years: 1899–1908; 1914–1920
- Rank: Brigadier-General
- Commands: 119th (Welsh) Brigade (1916–1919); 9th Battalion (Royal Irish Rifles) of the 107th (Ulster) Brigade (1915–1916)
- Conflicts: Second Boer War: Battle of Spion Kop; First World War: Battle of the Somme; Battle of Cambrai; German spring offensive; Battle of the Lys; Lithuanian Wars of Independence; Irish War of Independence
- Awards: Companion of the Order of the Bath; Companion of the Order of St Michael and St George; Distinguished Service Order; Mentioned in Despatches

Brigadier-General Frank Percy Crozier, CB, CMG, DSO (1 January 1879 – 31 August 1937) was a British Army officer. His first military experience was in the Second Boer War (1899–1902) and with the Royal West African Frontier Force in Nigeria. During the First World War, he commanded the 9th (Service) Battalion of the 107th (Ulster) Brigade in the Battle of the Somme, earning him the promotion to brigadier general and command of the 119th (Welsh) Brigade in the Battle of Cambrai and German spring offensive.

After the war, he briefly served as an advisor of the newly established Lithuanian Army and commander of the Auxiliary Division of the Royal Irish Constabulary at the time of the Partition of Ireland. However, he quickly became disillusioned with the conduct of the auxiliaries during the conflict. Crozier became a pacifist and published several controversial autobiographical books.

== Military career ==
Crozier was born in Bermuda into a family of military traditions. Both of his grandfathers served in the army and his father was a major in the Royal Scots Fusiliers. Crozier was not accepted into the military due to his short height and low weight. In 1898, seeking adventure, he travelled to Ceylon (Sri Lanka) and briefly worked at a tea plantation. At the outbreak of the Second Boer War, Crozier travelled to South Africa and joined a mounted infantry regiment as the recruitment standards had been lowered. He saw action in the British colonies of Natal and Transvaal, including the Battle of Spion Kop. He also served in the Royal West African Frontier Force in Nigeria. Military duties took their toll and Crozier started drinking. In 1905, after a bout of malaria, he returned to England and joined first the Manchester Regiment as a lieutenant and then the part-time 3rd (Reserve) Battalion, Loyal North Lancashire Regiment as a captain in the Special Reserve. However, in 1908, he was forced to resign due to repeated dishonoured cheques and became bankrupt. Discredited at home, he sailed to Canada and took up farming. That did not last long and Crozier returned home in 1912 amidst the Home Rule Crisis. In Belfast, Crozier joined the Ulster Volunteers as a mercenary (his own description).

=== First World War ===
At the outbreak of the First World War in June 1914, many of Ulster Volunteers, including Crozier, joined the British Army and formed the 36th (Ulster) Division. Crozier was appointed second in command of the 9th (Service) Battalion of the Royal Irish Rifles, 107th (Ulster) Brigade. He travelled in Ireland, Scotland, England recruiting soldiers and officers. He also dealt with morale issues: alcohol abuse (which was also a personal issue as he was a recovering alcoholic), casual sex, sexually transmitted diseases, looting. Due to these morale issues, in November 1915, the 107th Brigade was attached to the 4th Infantry Division and Colonel Crozier was made the commander of the 9th Battalion. The battalion was sent to its first battle near Thiepval on 1 July 1916 as part of the larger Battle of the Somme. On 20 November 1916, he was promoted brigadier general and given the command of the 119th (Welsh) Brigade of the 40th Division. The brigade suffered particularly heavy losses, some half of the men, in the Battle of Estaires on 9–11 April 1918. He commanded the 119th Brigade until he was demobilised on 16 August 1919, nine months after the armistice with Germany which ended the war.

At the outbreak of the First World War in August 1914, Crozier and many members of the Ulster Volunteers joined the British Army. He was appointed second-in-command of the 9th (Service) Battalion, Royal Irish Rifles, part of the 107th (Ulster) Brigade of the 36th (Ulster) Division. He travelled throughout Ireland, Scotland and England recruiting soldiers and officers. In November 1915 he became commanding officer of the battalion.

==== Execution of James Crozier ====
One of the most controversial episodes of Crozier's military career concerned the execution of rifleman James Crozier (service number 14218), of the 9th Battalion, Royal Irish Rifles, on 27 February 1916. The circumstances surrounding the execution were described by Crozier in his 1930 memoir A Brass Hat in No Man's Land. He recounted the cases of two members of his battalion: James and a junior officer whom he disguised under the name "Rochdale" (identified by historian Michael Anthony Taylor as lieutenant Arthur Annandale). While Annandale was released from the consequences of his court martial and returned to England, James was executed following Crozier's recommendation. Crozier's account of the execution became one of the most frequently cited passages in his later writings. In 1937, he published The Men I Killed, revisiting his experiences of wartime killing and executions. By this time he had become an active advocate of pacifism and the Peace Pledge Union.

=== Lithuania ===
On 19 September 1919, along with several other British officers, Crozier joined the new Lithuanian Army as an advisor to the General Staff during the Lithuanian Wars of Independence. An exception was made for him and he was granted the rank of major general of the Lithuanian Army. The British Foreign Office sought to organise an unified army of Lithuanian, Latvians, Estonians, and Poles commanded by Crozier to drive out any remaining German forces, including the Bermontians, from the area. The plan failed when Lithuanians refused to allow Polish troops into their territory. On 1 March 1920, Crozier resigned his duties with the Lithuanian Army. While there was an increasing resentment of foreigners' influence within the Lithuanian Army, Crozier left on good terms with the Lithuanian government.

=== Irish War of Independence ===
After the brief stint in Lithuania, Crozier returned to Ireland and became commander of the Auxiliary Division of the Royal Irish Constabulary (RIC) in July 1920. Crozier and his men guarded Kevin Barry before his execution. He quickly became disillusioned with the conduct of Black and Tans and Auxiliary Division of the RIC. In February 1921, he dismissed 21 auxiliaries under his command after their raids on Trim, County Meath and Drumcondra, Dublin that left two young men dead. His superior, the Chief of Police in Ireland Henry Tudor, ordered the auxiliaries reinstated and Crozier resigned in protest. This made it impossible for him to find other official employment. After his resignation Crozier wrote in the Times of London advocating that a truce be called in Ireland.

=== Civilian life ===
Crozier unsuccessfully ran in the 1923 general election for the Labour Party in Portsmouth Central. He turned to writing and lecturing to earn a living, though unpaid bills and dishonoured cheques continued to follow him. Crozier's books were politically controversial, viewed by the Government they criticised as inaccurate, and dismissive toward Crozier as "discredited". He became a pacifist, an active member of the Peace Pledge Union, and a speaker for the League of Nations Union. He died in 1937 in London.

== Bibliography ==
- Crozier, Frank (1930). A Brass Hat in No Man's Land. New York: J. Cape & H. Smith. OCLC 2861763.
- Impressions and Recollections, 1930
- Five Years Hard: being an account of the fall of the Fulani Empire and a picture of the daily life of a Regimental Officer among the peoples of Western Sudan, 1932
- Ireland for Ever, 1932
- The Men I Killed, 1937
