= 13th (Service) Battalion, East Surrey Regiment (Wandsworth) =

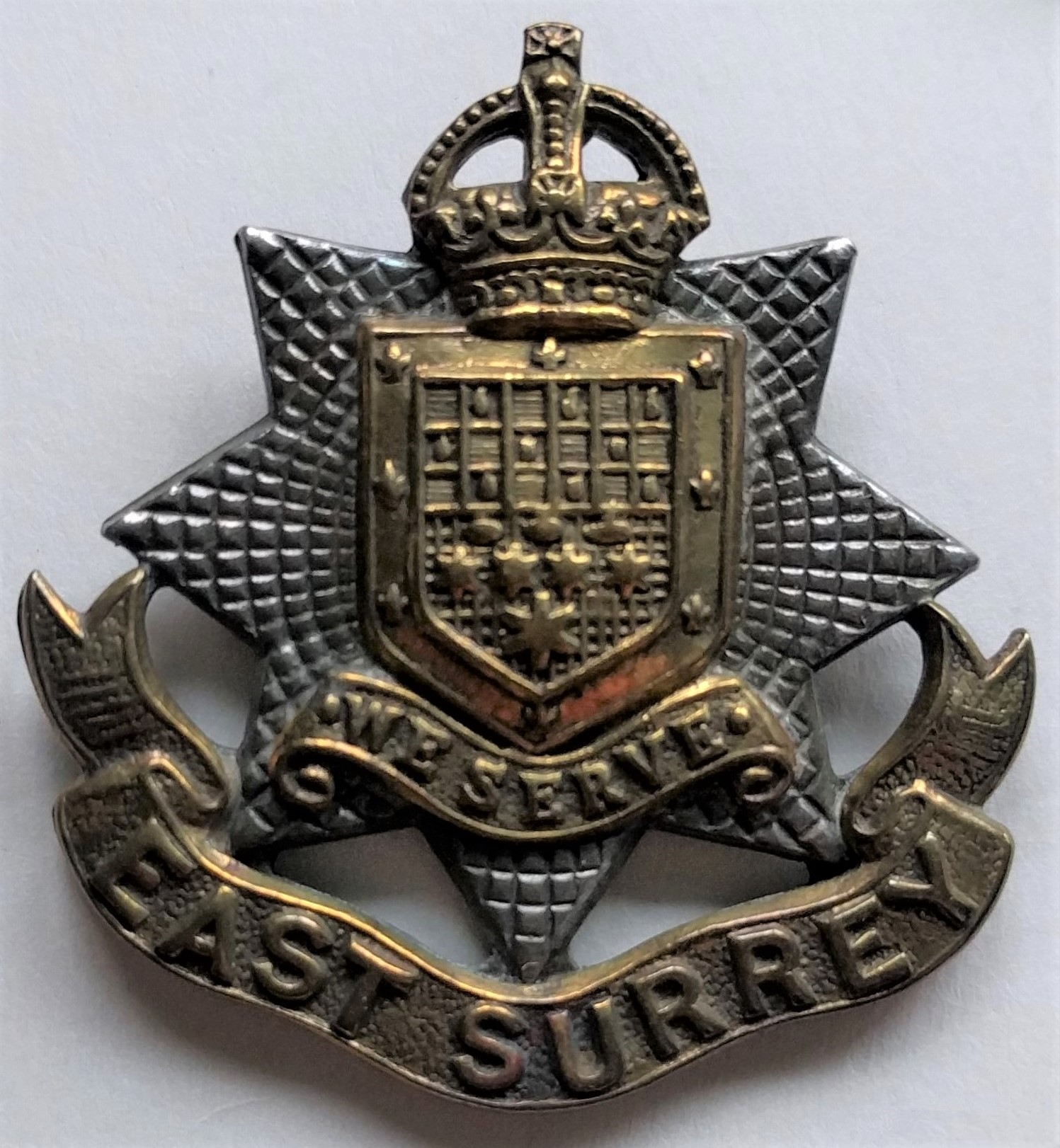
- Cap badge of the 13th East Surreys, incorporating the arms of Wandsworth
- Active: 16 June 1915- 3 November 1918
- Country: United Kingdom
- Branch: New Army
- Type: Pals battalion
- Role: Infantry
- Size: Battalion
- Part of: East Surrey Regiment
- Garrison/HQ: Wandsworth
- Nickname(s): 'The Wandsworth Regulars'
- Patron: Mayor and Borough of Wandsworth
- Engagements: German Retreat to the Hindenburg Line; Villers-Plouich; Bourlon Wood; German spring offensive Battle of the Lys

Insignia
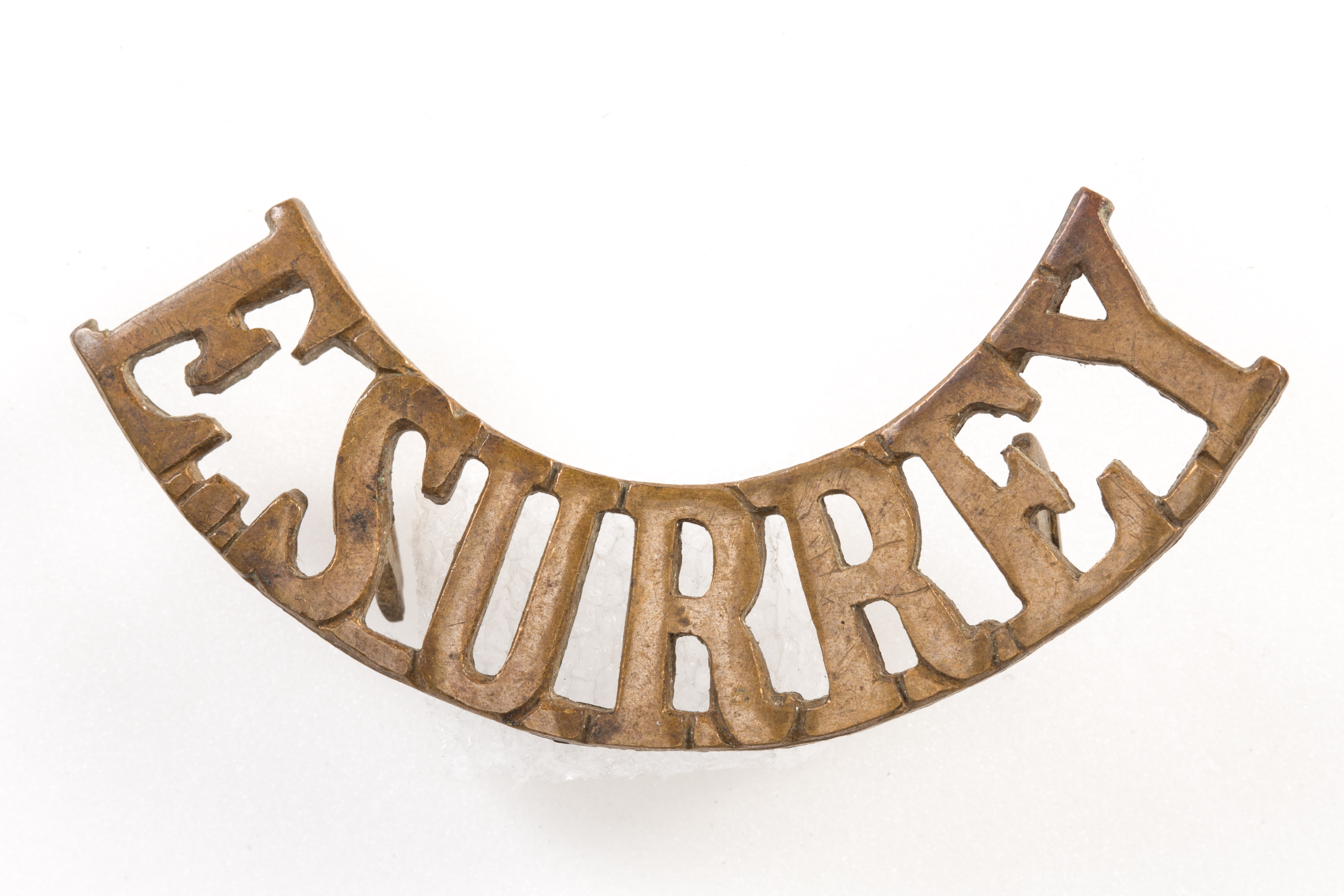
- Shoulder title

The 13th (Service) Battalion, East Surrey Regiment (Wandsworth) (13th East Surreys or 13th ESR) was an infantry unit recruited as part of 'Kitchener's Army' in World War I. It was raised in the summer of 1915 by the Mayor and Borough of Wandsworth in the suburbs of South London. It served on the Western Front from June 1916, and distinguished itself at the capture of Villers-Plouich and at Bourlon Wood. It then fought through the German spring offensive and the Battle of the Lys, when most of the battalion was surrounded and captured. Reduced to a training cadre the battalion was sent back to England to be reconstituted, but was eventually disbanded just before the end of the war

== Recruitment ==
Alfred Leete's recruitment poster for Kitchener's Army.

On 6 August 1914, less than 48 hours after Britain's declaration of war, Parliament sanctioned an increase of 500,000 men for the Regular British Army. The newly appointed Secretary of State for War, Earl Kitchener of Khartoum, issued his famous call to arms: 'Your King and Country Need You', urging the first 100,000 volunteers to come forward. Men flooded into the recruiting offices and the 'first hundred thousand' were enlisted within days. This group of six divisions with supporting arms became known as Kitchener's First New Army, or 'K1'. The K2, K3 and K4 battalions, brigades and divisions followed soon afterwards. But the flood of volunteers overwhelmed the ability of the Army to absorb them, and the K5 units were largely raised by local initiative rather than at regimental depots, often from men from particular localities or backgrounds who wished to serve together: these were known as 'Pals battalions'. The 'Pals' phenomenon quickly spread across the country, as local recruiting committees offered complete units to the War Office (WO). Encouraged by this response, in February 1915 Kitchener approached the 28 Metropolitan boroughs of the County of London, and the 'Great Metropolitan Recruiting Campaign' went ahead in April, with each mayor asked to raise a unit of local men.

Alderman Archibald Dawnay, Mayor of Wandsworth, and his council offered to raise a complete infantry battalion of 1350 officers and men. The council established a battalion orderly room in the Town Hall. The borough recruiting officer aimed for 200 volunteers from each of Wandsworth's five parishes, and had the use of the East Surrey Regiment's recruiting offices of 31st Regimental District. The recruiting office in Streatham High Road enlisted the first volunteer (a Council employee) for the Wandsworth Battalion (or 'Wandsworth Regulars') on 3 June, long before the battalion was formally authorised by the WO on 16 June as the 13th (Service) Battalion, East Surrey Regiment (Wandsworth). (The East Surrey Regiment was the Regular Army regiment covering South-West London, the pre-war London Regiment consisting entirely of part-time soldiers of the Territorial Force.) As commanding officer (CO), Dawnay obtained Captain Alfred Burton, a former Regular and Territorial Force officer who had rejoined as a paymaster at the outbreak of war. Burton had recently been appointed second-in-command of the 12th (Bermondsey) Bn, East Surreys with the rank of Temporary Major; now he was promoted to Temporary Lieutenant-Colonel and became CO of the Wandsworth Battalion. Dawnay proposed to Kitchener that the battalion should have its own version of the East Surreys' cap badge, and somewhat unexpectedly this was authorised by the Army Council. The escutcheon and motto ('We Serve') from the coat of arms of Wandsworth were displayed at the centre of the badge, instead of the arms of Guildford, worn more generally by the East Surrey Regiment. The badge was designed by T.C. Willett, the mayor's secretary, and was manufactured by a local firm in Putney.

Recruitment was slow at first, only 55 men having enlisted by the end of June, but then picked up, partly because of the fame of 19-year-old Lance-Corporal Edward Dwyer of 1st Bn East Surreys, who had just been invested at Buckingham Palace with the Victoria Cross (VC) he won at Hill 60 at Ypres. Dwyer gave speeches and joined recruiting marches across the borough. He was accompanied by Colour-Sergeant James Smith, who had won the VC on the North-West Frontier in 1897 and was now running the Wandsworth Battalion's recruiting offices. The Mayoress, Mrs Dawnay, and the wife of Alderman Melhuish set up a Women's Recruiting Committee in the borough to raise money and encourage men to enlist, but they voted not to hand out white feathers to men who were not in uniform. By the end of July nearly 900 recruits had been enlisted. The battalion was easily able to fill its depot company in addition to the four rifle companies, and eventually the borough supplied the great majority of 14th (Reserve) Battalion (see below). Early drills were carried out in the yard at Young's Ram Brewery in Wandsworth, some companies then used Wandsworth Common, later training was at a field off Buckhold Road, loaned by Mr A. Rawlings.

== Training ==
The battalion was officially taken over by the WO on 28 August and in early September it went by train from Barnes Station to Milford Station in Surrey, and then marched into Witley Camp to join 41st Division. In October 41st Division exchanged some units with 39th Division, and 13th East Surreys moved to Barrosa Barracks, Aldershot, to join 118th Brigade in 39th Division, where it was brigaded with the 20th (Shoreditch) and 21st (Islington) Battalions, Middlesex Regiment, and 14th Battalion, Argyll and Sutherland Highlanders (A&SH).

In November 39th Division moved to Witley, where it continued its training around the Devil's Punch Bowl. Route marches were carried out with full kit, the pouches filled with iron weights (known as 'Kitchener's chocolate') to simulate the weight of ammunition. The men of 13th Royal Surreys were among those guilty of discarding these weights in roadside ditches. Unfit men were 'weeded out' and exchanged for others from 14th (R) Bn. On 15 December Lt-Col Burton left to take command of 14th (R) Bn and was replaced by a younger man, Major W.C. Newton, a Regular officer of the Middlesex Regiment with recent active service, who was promoted to take command. In January 1916 13th East Surreys underwent their musketry course on the rifle ranges at Ash with their newly issued rifle.

39th Division received its mobilisation orders during February 1916 and advance parties left for France. However, the Pals battalions of 118th Bde had not completed their training, so it was decided to replace them with more advanced units and leave them behind to join 40th Division at Blackdown Camp. 40th Division had originally been composed of 'bantams' – fit volunteers who did not meet the normal minimum height requirement for the infantry. But the supply of suitable recruits had dwindled, and it had been necessary to amalgamate several of its battalions to produce enough fit men. On 23 February 1916 the four pals battalions of 118th Bde replaced the disbanded bantam units, and 13th East Surrey and 14th A&SH joined 120th Bde, where they served alongside the reorganised bantams of the 11th (S) Bn, King's Own (Royal Lancaster Regiment) (11th KORL) and 14th (S) Bn, Highland Light Infantry (14th HLI).

40th Division continued with its training, and in May was warned to prepare to move to the Western Front and join the British Expeditionary Force (BEF). It completed its mobilisation on 31 May and entrainment to the embarkation ports began. 13th East Surreys, with a strength of 34 officers and 970 other ranks (ORs), marched to Frimley station on 3 June and boarded two trains for Southampton Docks. The two half battalions the boarded the troopships Queen Alexandra and Hunscraft and disembarked at Le Havre next day.

=== 14th (Reserve) Battalion ===
The 14th (Reserve) Battalion, East Surrey Regiment, was formed in Wandsworth in the summer of 1915 from the depot companies of 12th (Bermondsey) and 13th (Wandsworth) Bns as a Local Reserve battalion to supply reinforcement drafts to the two service battalions. In practice the majority of the men came from the surplus recruits to the Wandsworth Bn, and Lt-Col Burton transferred to command it. On 1 November, when it had reached a strength of between 500 and 600 it went to Gravesend, where it joined 26th Reserve Brigade. However, on 26 June 1916 it was absorbed into the other battalions of 26th Reserve Bde. Thereafter the duty of finding drafts for 13th East Surreys was taken over by 5th (Reserve) Battalion, East Surreys, formed from the 3rd Line of the 5th and 6th (Territorial Force) battalions in the Home Counties Reserve Brigade.

== Western Front ==
On 9 June 40th Division completed its concentration around Lillers near Béthune in First Army's area. Here it resumed training, as well as supplying working parties. On 16 June it moved closer to the front so that units could be sent up the line for attachment to 15th (Scottish) Division in the Lens sector for their introduction to trench warfare. 13th East Surreys were attached to 44th Bde, and each company was attached to a different battalion in the front line for four days:

- A Company to 8th Seaforth Highlanders
- B Company to 8th/10th Gordon Highlanders
- C Company to 7th Cameron Highlanders
- D Company to 9th Black Watch

During these attachments the battalion suffered its first few casualties. On 11 July 13th ESR took over its own section of the front for the first time, facing the Hohenzollern Redoubt. B Company amused themselves by going out at night and placing notice bards in the enemy wire giving news of Allied successes. The battalion also carried out its first trench raid. Enemy shellfire and snipers accounted for a steady trickle of casualties. On 8 August the British carried out a bombardment with rifle grenades and trench mortars to test the enemy response, and 13th ESR lost 5 men killed and 10 wounded from the Germans' retaliatory bombardment. For the rest of the summer the battalion alternated between trench duty and billets in Loos. 40th Division was taken out of the line and rested in September, but returned to the Loos sector later in the month.

=== Ancre ===
All summer the Somme Offensive had been raging further south. In late October 40th Division prepared to enter the fighting. First it marched to Averdoingt to carry out training, then on 2 November it began the march south. It paused at Vacquerie on 5 November for a further week's training. It then resumed its march via Doullens to Souastre. 120th Brigade was then loaned to 49th (West Riding) Division and took over a sector of that formation's front line at Hébuterne on 15 November. Here the trenches were falling in under the wet weather and were impassable in places. Although the Battle of the Ancre (the final phase of the Somme Offensive) had begun, 13th ESR's sector was quiet. However the battalion was caught by an enemy bombardment on 19 November; 2 ORs were killed and 5 wounded, and the battalion won its first gallantry medal when Company Sergeant-Major R.J. Padget went forward under heavy fire to rescue men from collapsed shelters. He was awarded the Distinguished Conduct Medal (DCM).

=== Winter 1916–17 ===
120th Brigade's attachment ended on 21 November and it joined the rest of 40th Division at Couin, then marched back to billets, with 13th ESR at Bussus-Bussuel from 24 November. It remained there, training, until 14 December, when it marched to Pont-Remy where it entrained for Dernancourt, where it went into camp. Much effort was spent on draining the camp, and 13th ESR contributed a detachment of men to '40th Division Works Battalion'. On 26 December 120th Bde took over the front line at Bouchavesnes; each battalion went into the line with 20 officers and 600 ORs, the surplus details remaining in camp. When the battalion was relieved on 31 December it took 7 hours struggling along mud-filled communication trenches to meet the lorries waiting to take the exhausted men back to camp. The battalion went back into the line on 8 January 1917 in the Rancourt sector, where the defences consisted of a string of small posts surrounded by mud, and 120th Bde had to organise mule trains to bring up supplies each night. Sickness began to take its toll of the battalion's strength. Lieutenant-Col Newton was in poor heath and during January Lt-Col Ernest Atkins (Leicestershire Regiment) was posted as second-in-command and frequently deputised for Lt-Col Newton. After one more spell in the front line, 18–22 January, 13th ESR left the sector at the end of January for rest billets in Corbie and then to Bray-sur-Somme, where it spent the next month in training and on working parties (3 ORs being killed while unloading ammunition from a train). The training emphasised Lewis guns and the new 'fighting platoon' tactics. After six weeks out of the line, the battalion returned to the trenches at Bouchavesnes on 6 March, where it began alternating with 14th A&SH between the front line, support line, and brigade reserve at 'Howitzer Wood', in snow and under regular shelling.

=== Villers-Plouich ===
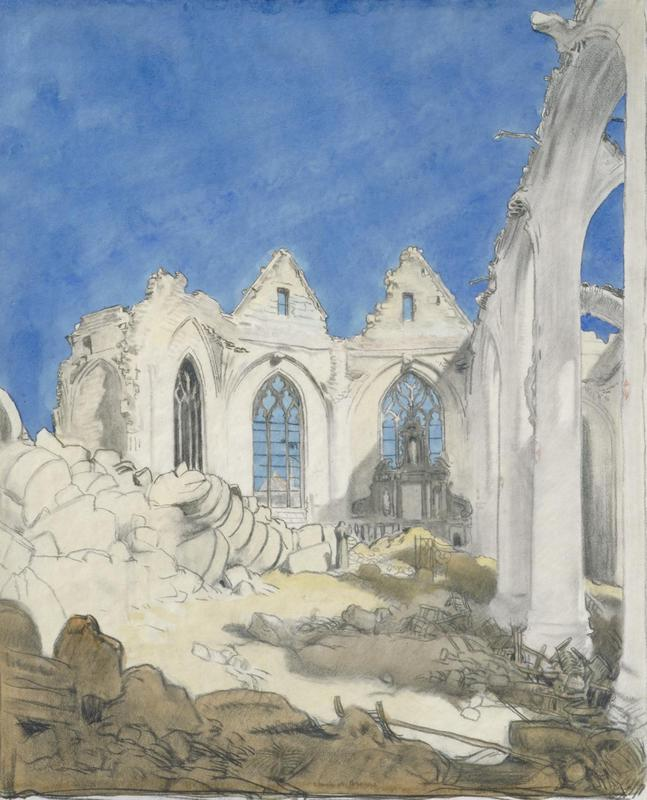
The Church, Péronne, by Sir William Orpen, showing the destruction by the retreating Germans, 1917.

On 17 March a raid by 40th Division under cover of bad weather reported the German front line to be only lightly held. That day the Germans had begun withdrawing from in front of the division. This was part of a large-scale retreat to the prepared positions of the Hindenburg Line (Operation Alberich). The division immediately began cautiously following up, with patrols out in front, in contact with German rearguards. 13th ESR was in brigade reserve at the time and was not ordered forward until the following day. Brigade HQ ordered 13th ESR's transport officer, Lt Beecroft, to take up ammunition and supplies to the battalion heading in the direction of Péronne, but could not tell him where it might be found. Towards dusk Beecroft was approaching the town with no sign of the battalion. Although warned by an officer that the Germans might still be in the town, he decided to risk it and his column of pack mules passed through the deserted and burning town without opposition, to the amazement of a British cavalry patrol cautiously following him up the road. By chance he managed to find 13th ESR spending the night in abandoned farm buildings and dugouts at Allaines, having passed by Péronne. Leaving 13th ESR at Allaines as XV Corps' reserve 40th Division continued its deliberate advance until 24 March when it was leapfrogged by another division taking the lead. The troops were then set to repairing the roads and railways that had been destroyed by the retreating enemy. 13th ESR was based at Curlu from 21 March, working on the Maricourt–Péronne railway. Once communications had been restored, 40th Division closed up to the line of fortified villages that formed the outpost screen for the Hindenburg Line. It was here that German resistance stiffened.

40th Division began operations against these outposts on 21 April. With both Lt-Cols Newton and Atkins absent on courses, the battalion was temporarily commanded by Capt L.B. Mills. 119th Brigade attacked 'Fifteen Ravine' with 120th Bde on its left. The battalions of 119th Bde had a stiff fight for the shallow ravine itself, but for 13th ESR it was an almost bloodless operation. Shortly after midnight on 20/21 April the battalion sent forward patrols that found no sign of the enemy, so it moved about 1 mile (1.6 km) forward and established a string of strongpoints roughly 1,000 yards (910 m) from the strongly-held village of Villers-Plouich. The rest of the battalion held the main line of resistance back on the edge of Gouzeaucourt Wood. Its casualties in this operation were just 3 wounded. On 24 April 13th ESR led the attack on Villers-Plouich, with the second objective being to establish a line on the rising ground behind ('Highland Ridge'). The battalion went into action with 24 officers and 600 ORs. At 02.00 the battalion moved forward and occupied the line between Fifteen Ravine. A Company was on the left, B Company on the right, supported by C and D Companies respectively; one platoon of each support company carried tools to dig in and consolidate the captured positions. The battalion crept up to the enemy wire in four waves and then attacked behind the Creeping barrage when it came down at Zero (04.15). Although the enemy sent up signal rockets, their answering counter-barrage was erratic and caused little damage. The battalion was in the enemy front trench within seven minutes, and after a short struggle overcame all resistance and moved on towards the village. Strongpoints and machine gun emplacements caused trouble, but these were overcome with concentrated Lewis gun fire and bombing attacks. Reaching the village at 05.30 the battalion split into three parties. The left party stormed a strongpoint on the sunken road between Villers-Plouich and Beaucamp, taking over 100 prisoners. The centre party went through the left of the village and established itself on Highland Ridge beyond. The right party met more opposition on its way towards a ravine 700 yards (640 m) north-east of the village, suffering casualties. At this point Corporal Edward 'Tiny' Foster, a Wandsworth Council dustman in civilian life, who was commanding two Lewis gun teams, stormed the German machine gun position that was holding them up, followed by Lance-Corporal Reed. One of the Lewis guns was temporarily captured, but Foster threw bombs at the enemy, forcing them back, and then with both guns in action his party suppressed the enemy post, some 20 Germans surrendering to them. However, 14th A&SH had failed to take Beaucamp, so the right party did not move onto the ridge but formed a defensive flank. At 06.30 the British barrage ceased and the work of consolidation began. About 06.40 the Germans began bombarding the centre and right parties with heavy guns, so they withdrew into cover on the eastern outskirts of the village where the entrances were covered by Lewis guns. Just after 07.00 14th HLI reinforced 13th ESR and together the battalions pushed up to establish strongpoints east of the cemetery. Lieutenant Gordon Alexander, a former Olympic fencer, led a party forward, and rushed a machine gun post, turning the gun on the enemy. He was then killed while trying to rescue a wounded man. Captain Mills was wounded about 08.00 and Capt H.P. Naunton of C Company took over command. The enemy bombarded the village from 08.30 to 14.00 with heavy guns, paying particular attention to the tracks and entrances. Next day 11th KORL completed the capture of Beaucourt and at dusk 13th ESR was relieved and went back to Équancourt. The battalion's casualties were 3 officers and 26 ORs killed, 8 officers and 152 ORs wounded, and 10 missing.

For his gallantry Cpl Foster was awarded the Victoria Cross (VC), and L/Cpl Reed the DCM. Witnesses felt that Lt Alexander deserved a posthumous VC, but he only got a posthumous mention in dispatches. After the battle, British tench maps included 'Surrey Ravine' (where Foster won his VC), a communication trench known as 'Foster Lane', and a track named 'Surrey Lane'.

Lieutenant-Col Newton returned to command the battalion on 26 April, but was sent to a rest centre on 6 May and Maj J.H. Foster of 14th HLI took command until the end of the month. Captain W.G. West (1st Sherwood Foresters arrived as second-in-command and was promoted to temporary Major. 40th Division continued to hold the Villers-Plouich sector through the summer, the battalions alternating between the front, support and reserve lines, carrying out patrols, raids and working parties, and suffering a trickle of casualties. Lieutenant-Col Newton was away on sick leave again 1–11 July, when Maj West commanded the battalion, and Lt-Col Atkins officially left in August. On 18 August Lt-Col Herbert Warden, a Territorial Force officer of the Royal Scots who had previously commanded 25th Northumberland Fusiliers (Tyneside Irish), joined the battalion, and Lt-Col Newton was finally evacuated sick on 23 August, when Lt-Col Warden took over command.

=== Bourlon Wood ===
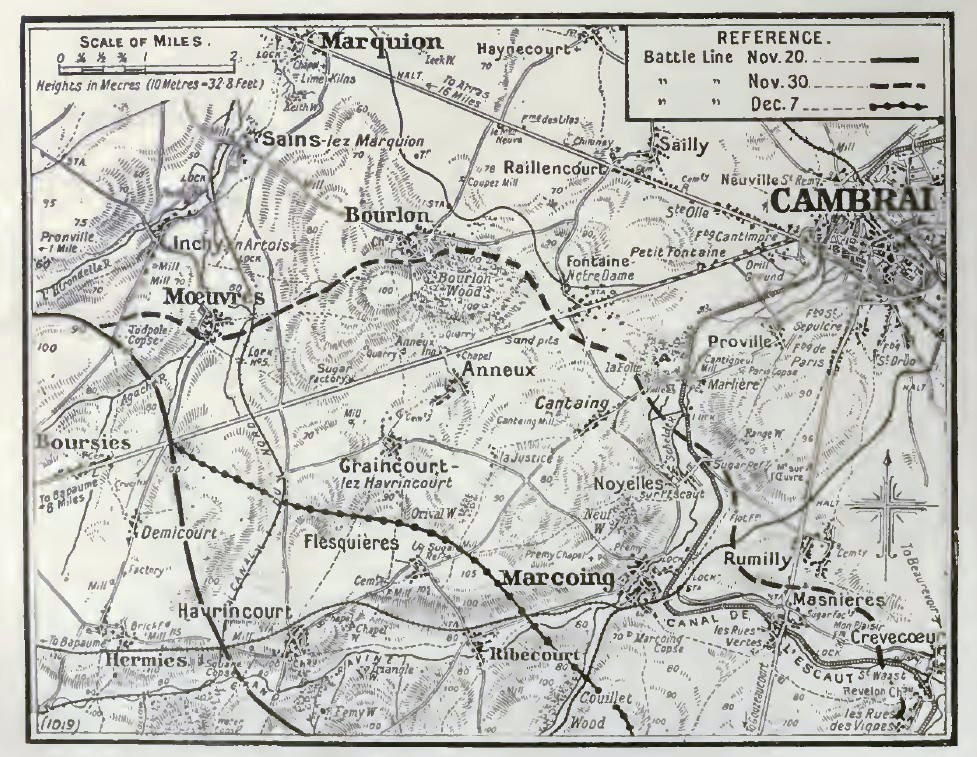
The Battle of Cambrai.

After six months' continuous service in the line, 40th Division was relieved at the beginning of October and went to the Fosseux area for rest. By then 13th ESR had been reduced to a strength of 19 officers and 480 ORs. It now moved with the division to the wooded area round Lucheux to begin training for the forthcoming Battle of Cambrai, with particular emphasis on fighting in woods and villages, ready for action in Bourlon Wood. The battle began with a massed tank attack on 20 November that broke through the Hindenburg Line, and the division moved up on 22 November in order attack Bourlon Wood next morning. The capture of the wood by 40th and 51st (Highland) Divisions would provide a defensive flank to allow Third Army to continue developing the successes of the first two days. The assault was launched at 10.30 by 119th and 121st Bdes with 120th Bde in reserve (it had only crossed the Canal du Nord at dawn). Confused fighting went on for two days and nights, with troops from 120th Bde being gradually fed into the line. On the afternoon of 24 November 14th HLI together with some tanks attacked Bourlon; although the HLI fought their way through the village, they became cut off on the other side. 40th Division ordered a renewed attack the following morning to break through and relieve them. The only troops available for this task were the uncommitted 13th ESR, with half of 11th KORL in support. The battalion commanders of 121st Bde holding the front line were convinced that 14th HLI had already been destroyed, but Lt-Col Warden observed that the German artillery barrage seemed designed to stop the HLI being reinforced. He made a reconnaissance in the dark and the battalion was assembled near the south-eastern edge of the village by 06.00. The leading three companies were each to send one platoon straight through to link up and reinforce 14th HLI while the rest 'mopped up', D Company being in reserve. The battalion advanced alone, without tank or artillery support, at 06.15, just before dawn. Almost immediately fire was opened from the trees in the right rear; this was dealt with by D Company which faced about and attacked the Germans in the wood. The East Surreys found the battalion HQ and remains of one company of the HLI in a building on the Fontaine-Notre-Dam road at the entrance to Bourlon, and Lt-Col Warden and his battalion HQ joined them (the CO of 14th HLI was mortally wounded about 07.00). C Company on the right had made no progress through the houses, and Warden used it with D Company to extend from the HQ strongpoint along Bourlon Ridge. These positions fought off attacks from north, east and south. The other two companies tried to fight their way through the village, but they were unable to get through to the HLI companies furthest forward, though one platoon took and held a trench north of the village that the Germans had recently captured from the HLI. Warden was then ordered to capture the railway line beyond the village, but realised that all he could do was to hold the edge of the wood and fringe of the village. As A and B Companies fell back from the village Warden added them to the HQ strongpoint, which protected the left flank of 119th Bde fighting in the wood. A section of 121st Bde's trench mortar battery also arrived and brought its two mortars to bear on houses containing German riflemen and machine gunners, the infantry providing carrying parties for the mortar ammunition. Warden's mixed force held on until darkness fell, relying on runners for communication with the rear. 40th Division was relieved that night but the incoming troops knew nothing of 13th ESR's positions, and Warden was sent a vague instruction to withdraw when the 14th HLI had been extricated by some tanks that had been ordered up (none arrived and 14th HLI had already been eliminated). Given this confusion, Warden decided to hold his ground through the night, and continued to do so until the following evening. By then the Germans had brought up heavy trench mortars to fire on the strongpoint and he was informed that his companies were occupying the barrage line for a major British attack next morning (27 November). 13th ESR and the survivors of 14th HLI were brought back to dugouts in the rear, where they established a new line. The rest of 14th HLI and the platoon of A Company beyond the village had been compelled to surrender. 13th ESR battalion did not leave Bourlon Wood until noon on 27 November, having lost 6 officers and 223 ORs in the battle out of a frontline strength of 21 officers and 602 ORs.

=== Winter 1917–18 ===
13th ESR went back by bus and lorry for rest at Blairville on 28 November, but the Germans launched a major counter-offensive on 30 November, taking back most of the gains of the Battle of Cambrai. By 10 December the battalion was back holding frontline trenches at Fontaine-lès-Croisilles in severe winter weather and under regular mustard gas shelling. Over just three days, 12–14 December, the battalion lost 3 officers and 51 ORs wounded or gassed, and 2 ORs killed. At the end of December the battalion moved to the Bullecourt sector where it alternated between 'Horseshoe Redoubt' in the front line and a camp in the rear. Further moves in January 1918 took the battalion to Suzanne and then to Bapaume. 40th Division was withdrawn into GHQ Reserve at Hendecourt near Arras on 10 February. Lieutenant-Col Warden was in temporary command of 120th Bde for part of the month, when Maj West commanded the battalion.

By February 1918 the BEF was facing a manpower crisis. All brigades were reduced from four to three battalions and the surplus disbanded to provide reinforcements. Among the surplus battalions being disbanded was 7th East Surreys – the regiment's senior 'K' battalion – from 12th (Eastern) Division, and between 7 and 9 February 13th East Surreys received a draft of 8 officers and 180 ORs from that source. 119th Brigade, the 'Welsh Bantam Brigade', had almost disappeared, so on 16 February 13th ESR was transferred to it, leaving 120th Bde to become an all-Scottish formation. The Wandsworth battalion was now brigaded alongside 18th Welsh Regiment (2nd Glamorgan) of the original 119th Bde and 21st Middlesex Regiment (Islington) transferred from 121st Bde. 119th Brigade was commanded by the controversial Brigadier-General Frank Crozier. Crozier was displeased with the reorganisation, believing that 13th ESR and 21st Middlesex had both let him down at Bourlon Wood. He had a particular disregard for TF officers such as Lt-Col Warden, despite the Distinguished Service Order (DSO) that Warden had been awarded for Bourlon Wood. (Crozier wrote that 13th ESR 'deceived me, as I thought they were better than they were. Undoubtedly they could have been had they been better led'.) Crozier trained the brigade hard during March, using 18th Welsh as the demonstration battalion for his methods.

=== German Spring Offensive ===
The Germans launched the first phase of their long-anticipated Spring Offensive (Operation Michael) on 21 March and secured immediate breakthroughs. At the time 40th Division was in GHQ reserve. During the first day 119th Bde was around Mercatel at half an hour's notice to move; as it grew dark about 17.30, the brigade was ordered towards the threatened Henin Hill in the second line of defences. Despite chaos on the roads the brigade arrived by 22.30, beginning to dig in on and behind the hill. However, at 00.15 it had to make another night march to go into reserve to 34th Division, which had been engaged all day, and a company of 13th ESR was sent up to Croisilles to assist that division. By dawn 18th WR had taken up position in the Sensée Switch trench west of St-Léger, with 13th ESR in support and 21st Middlesex in reserve. By 14.15 there were no British troops in front of 18th WR. At 18.00 news came that St-Léger had been captured and two companies of 13th ESR were ordered to attack the village with two tanks, but 18th WR saw an opportunity, commandeered the tanks, and carried out the attack instead, stopping the Germans. By nightfall 13th ESR, facing east, formed the end of 119th Bde's semicircular frontage. During the night firing broke out in the right rear and 119th Bde was informed that the enemy had broken through at Mory. 13th ESR's right was now 'in the air', and the brigade extended its line to the right. A and B Companies of 13th ESR found Ervillers still in British hands, but Mory had been captured. In the morning Crozier launched attacks on Mory, first with 21st Middlesex supported by B Company 13th ESR, which regained most of the high ground, No 5 Platoon of B Company being stopped just short of the crest. Warden reported that Mory itself was not strongly held and 119th Bde ordered him to attack. He sent B company supported by C Company to attack the west side of the village while A Company seized the high ground to the left. D Company in reserve was to be ready to attack the south side and 'mop up'. Battalion HQ, with Lewis gunners and snipers, covered the attack from the spur to the south, while the battalion transport ferried up ammunition and bombs under shell and machine gun fire. At 14.30 13th ESR advanced by short rushes and reached the western outskirts of Mory. Here they were stopped by machine gun fire; among the wounded were the commanders of B and C Companies (both were led for the rest of the action by their company sergeant-majors) and the Medical Officer (MO), Lt D.E. Berney of the US Army Medical Corps, who continued dressing the wounded after being hit three times. Crozier later alleged that at this point he had to order the unnamed CO of 13th ESR (Lt-Col Warden) to press on even when he reported being held up by machine gun fire. Warden went up to the village himself, reorganised his three attacking companies and brought up the reserve company. At about 17.00 he launched them forward again to complete the recovery of Mory and the Green Line trench. This was achieved, but the East Surreys found that the trench was so battered by shellfire that afforded little or no cover. In the face of German reinforcements the brigade quietly left the village after dark and then had easy targets to fire into, causing enormous casualties to the Germans massed to attack the empty village. During the night Lt-Col Warden commanded the front line troops of all three battalions of 119th Bde east of Ervillers, and established contact with 4th Guards Bde (31st Division) on the left, though touch had been lost with 12th ESR (Bermondsey) of 41st Division off to the right. In the morning (24 March), when the Germans moved in mass up the valley below, 119th and 4th Guards brigades' small-arms fire from enfilade, together with 40th Divisional Artillery, overwhelmed them and stopped the movement. The two brigades stopped another attack (this time by small parties) about 15.00. However, by 18.00 German forces had broken through from the direction of St-Léger and 4th Gds Bde was withdrawing. The position of 119th Bde in Ervillers was critical but Crozier had no orders. He now had to put into practice the lesson of the Battle of Spion Kop that he had drummed into his officers: 'don't retire unless you're ordered to'. He expected his brigade to be 'mopped up' at daybreak on 25 March, but just in time he received permission to withdraw. The battalions fell back in turn, 13th ESR leaving last, to a line north of Ervillers. All through 25 March 40th Division held off attacks, but it was relieved that night. 119th Brigade went back to Bucquoy, then next day to Bienvillers-au-Bois in response to rumours of a breakthrough by German armoured cars. 13th ESR and 18th WR at Monchy-au-Bois formed the left flank of 40th Division. No attack came (the 'armoured cars' were French farm tractors), and the division finally left the line overnight. Its dogged defence of the spurs overlooking the Sensée Valley had done much to prevent the Germans expanding their breakthrough north towards Arras. 13th ESR's casualties for March were 1 officer and 17 ORs killed, 9 officers and 139 ORs wounded, and 52 missing, and the battalion still had a strength of nearly 800. Among other awards, Lt-Col Warden received a Bar to his DSO, and Lt Berney became the first US recipient of the British Military Cross.

=== Battle of the Lys ===
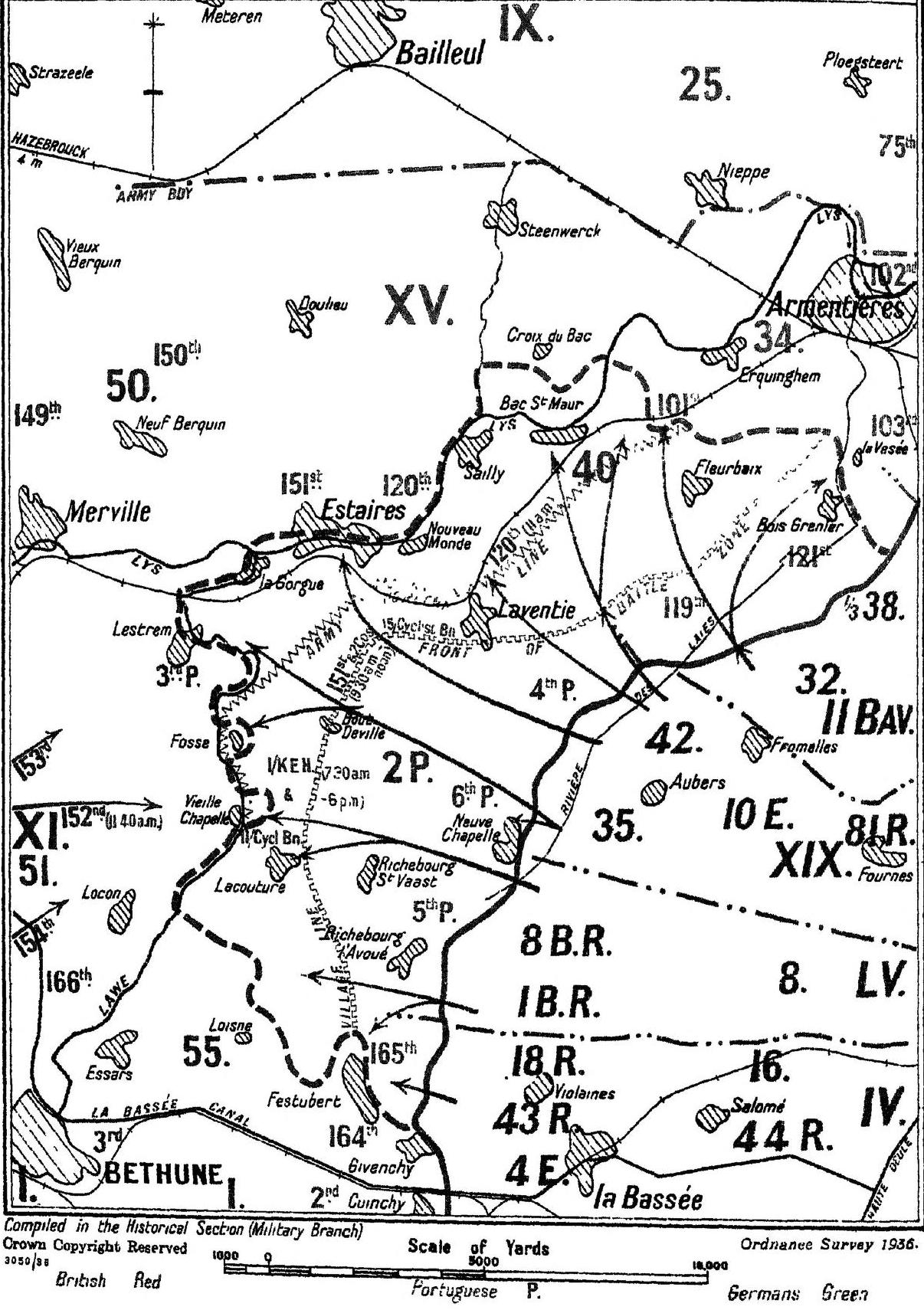
The German breakthrough to the Lys, 9 April 1918.

After the first phase of the German spring offensive, 40th Division was sent north to Merville to join First Army in a quiet sector to rest and refit. Lieutenant-Col Warden was admitted to hospital suffering from exhaustion (Crozier claimed that the MO 'found [ Warden ] fighting under his bed with a pillow, swearing it was a Boche') and Maj West deputised in command. On the night of 6/7 April 119th Bde went into the line at Armentières next to the inexperienced Portuguese Expeditionary Corps. 13th East Surrey (left) and 18th WR (right) were in the front trenches, 21st Middlesex in brigade reserve. The brigade also reconnoitred possible defensive flank positions if the Germans broke through the Portuguese. On the night of 8/9 April patrols from 13th ESR and 18th WR entered the enemy front line, finding it unoccupied at 03.00. However, at 04.15 on 9 April the Germans launched the second main phase of their offensive (Operation Georgette, the Battle of the Lys) with a massive bombardment: while trench mortars bombed the forward trenches, heavier guns shelled strongpoints, HQs, villages and crossroads with high explosive and gas. At 05.55 18th WR reported large numbers of Germans advancing on the Portuguese positions as the barrage lifted to the support line, and shortly afterwards German troops penetrated between the outposts of 18th WR and 13th ESR. Initially 13th ESR holding Fleurbaix was not attacked, though it was shelled heavily with gas and high explosive. However, as the Portuguese were overrun, first the forward posts and then the right company of 18th WR were 'mopped up' by Germans appearing out of the dense morning fog. About 8.30 these Germans began rolling up the line towards Fleurbaix and half an hour later 13th ESR's support trench was attacked from the right and rear. Soon the whole fighting part of the battalion was surrounded. Brigadier-Gen Crozier's telephone call to 13th ESR's HQ was answered by a German voice: battalion HQ had been overrun and captured without firing a shot. Some of the battalion's strongpoints held out until the afternoon, though Crozier was later critical of the speed with which the main body of 13th ESR surrendered.

A few men of 13th ESR fought their way out and got away to Sailly-sur-la-Lys. Here they took up positions south of the River Lys where Crozier had improvised a line with the remnants of 119th Bde and the divisional pioneer battalion (12th Green Howards). Between 13.00 and 14.00 Crozier withdrew over the river and the Royal Engineers blew the bridges. The survivors of 13th ESR joined up with those 18th WR at Le Petit Mortier Farm, behind the Steenwerck Switch trench, where they were later joined by the 'details' (2 officers and 150 ORs) of 13th ESR who had been back at the transport lines. Next morning a draft of reinforcements joined the battalion, which moved forwards to join the other remnants ('119th Composite Battalion') holding Steenwerck Switch trench. However, they were forced back and despite a counter-attack by 119th Comp. Bn regaining some of the lost ground, by the end of the day they had retired to Le Verrier, near Le Doulieu, where they spent the night. Next morning (11 April) the composite units drove back three more attacks. The brigade was relieved that evening and moved off to Strazeele, though it was still daylight and the troops were harassed by German aircraft while on the move.

=== Prisoners of War ===
The battalion's casualties were reported as 1 officer and 7 ORs known killed, 2 officers and 80 ORs wounded, 18 officers and 437 ORs missing (killed or prisoners). It later emerged that 11 officers and around 377 ORs had been taken prisoner. They were marched back through the German lines, narrowly avoiding being hit on the road by 12-inch shells being fired by a Royal Navy battery. The badly wounded were sent to hospitals, the officers were separated and sent directly to Germany, and the remaining ORs were marched back by stages to Lille where they were held in Fort Macdonald for a few days. They were then sent by train to a new Prisoner-of-war camp at Dülmen in Westphalia. Until the Armistice they were put to work, for example in the coal mines, while facing severe malnourishment (the Allied blockade was causing food shortages across Germany).

=== Reconstitution and disbandment ===
After suffering crippling losses in these actions, 40th Division was withdrawn from the line and temporarily formed composite units. Lieutenant-Col Warden returned from hospital on 14 April to command the remnants of 13th ESR. On 18 April two companies were attached to the 12th Suffolk Regiment to form 'C' Battalion of '40th Division Composite Brigade', and one of these was then moved to 12th Green Howards in 'B' Battalion. Meanwhile, the rest of 13th ESR reorganised and refitted at Moulle, carrying out training and absorbing some reinforcement drafts. From 27 April 'B' Battalion joined 'No 2 Composite Brigade' under Brig-Gen Crozier employed in digging the Poperinghe Line in case of further German breakthroughs. It was withdrawn on 2 May.

Because of the shortage of trained reinforcements, GHQ decided that several divisions could not be brought up to strength but instead would be reduced to 'Training cadres' (TCs) as instructors to the US Army divisions now arriving. 40th Division was among those selected, and its infantry battalions were each reduced to TCs of roughly 10 officers and 45 ORs: their surplus personnel were drafted as reinforcements to other units. On 5 May 1 officer and 447 ORs of 13th ESR went by train to the base at Calais for drafting, while those retained for the TC were billeted in Booninghem. 40th Division moved to Lederzeele and the staff and TCs continued to reconnoitre new defence lines. The officers and NCOs of 13th ESR received specialist training from senior instructors to prepare for its training role.

On 3 June 13th ESR and other TCs left 40th Division and travelled by train to Hardinghen, where they joined 34th Division, which would be training the US troops. On 13 June the 1st and 3rd Battalions, 310th US Infantry Regiment (78th US Division) arrived to be instructed by 13th ESR, with Lt-Col Warden commanding 310th Regimental School. This continued even though 13th ESR was formally transferred to 39th British Division on 17 June.

On 29 June the training staff of 13th ESR (9 officers and 47 ORs) went to Boulogne to join 25th Division, which was proceeding to England to be reconstituted. They arrived at Aldershot on the evening of 30 June and were posted to 7th Bde, and were granted leave while awaiting orders. On 16 July they left 25th Division and travelled to Lowestoft where 13th East Surreys was to be reformed under the administration of 225th Mixed Bde in 68th (2nd Welsh) Division. They established their HQ at the Empire Hotel and were joined by a number of officers from various regiments to help rebuild the battalion. The first draft of 74 men from the 3rd and 5th Reserve Bns, East Surreys, arrived on 17 July and were organised into companies. The bulk of the ORs were to be found by absorbing 15th (Service) Battalion, East Surreys, a new battalion of conscripts formed at Lowestoft on 1 June, though many came directly from the various reserve battalions stationed in the area. By the end of the month the battalion was roughly 400 strong, and this rose to 825 by the end of August. However, medical inspection showed that only 393 were fit for overseas service. Clearly this was unacceptable, so on 7 September the battalion was ordered to disband. The officers and men were drafted to other units, 23 officers being sent to France on 18 September to participate in the final actions of the war. By the end of the month the battalion had been reduced to a cadre of 11 officers and 74 ORs to complete the disbandment. The last few moved to the East Surreys' depot at Kingston upon Thames, where the battalion ceased to exist on 3 November, just before the Armistice.

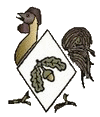
40th Division's formation sign after Bourlon Wood.

== Insignia ==
As well as the battalion's unique version of the East Surreys' cap badge (see above) and the brass title worn on the shoulder straps, all ranks of 13th Bn wore a cloth badge on both upper arms. This was the red diamond of 120th Bde with a white circle in the centre. When the battalion transferred to 119th Bde it adopted a horizontal red bar on each upper arm. The divisional badge was a bantam cock (40th Division had originally been composed of 'bantams') with a white diamond superimposed; after Bourlon Wood the division added an oak leaf and acorn sprig on the diamond.

== Memorials ==
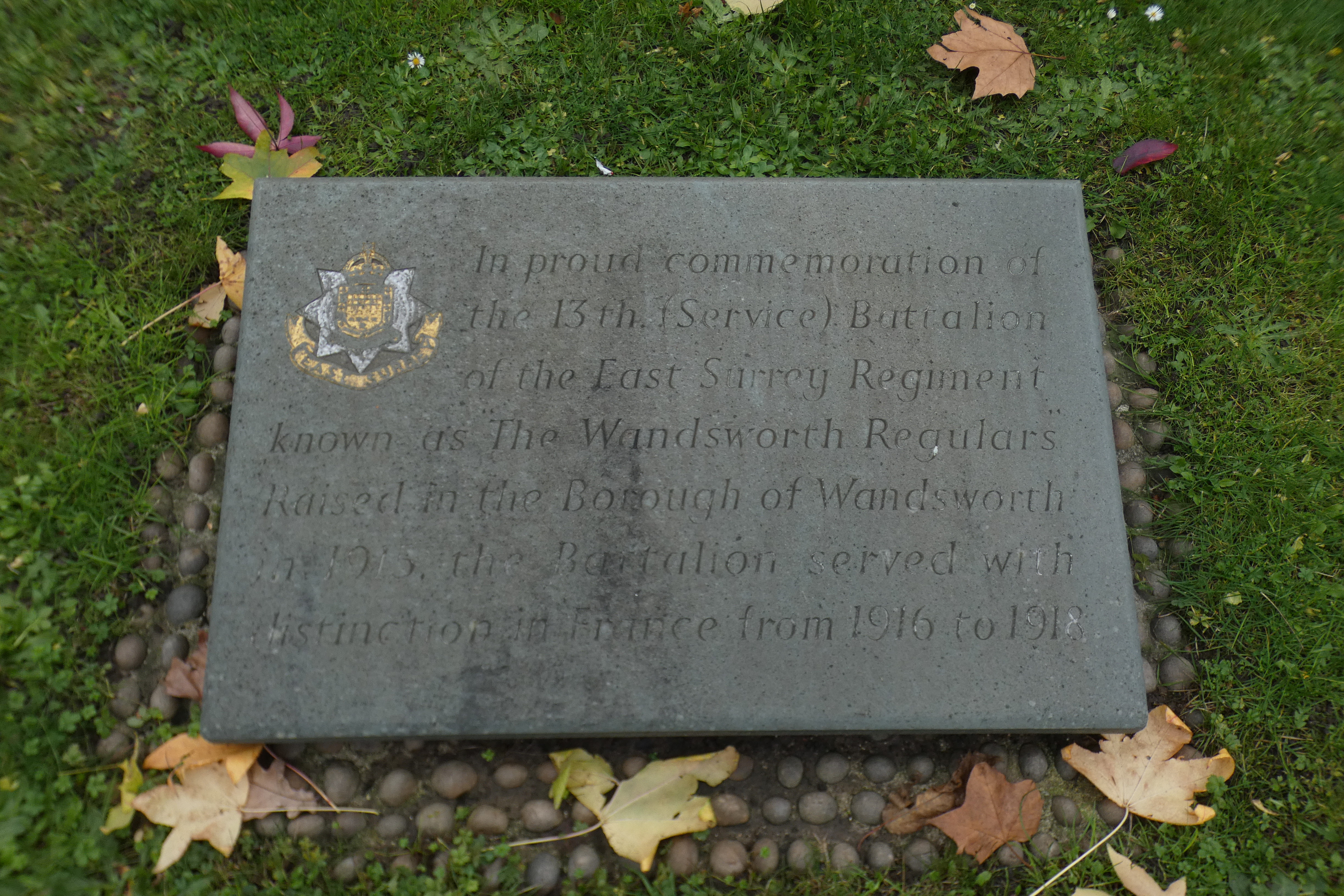
Memorial tablet at Wandsworth Town Hall to 13th East Surreys

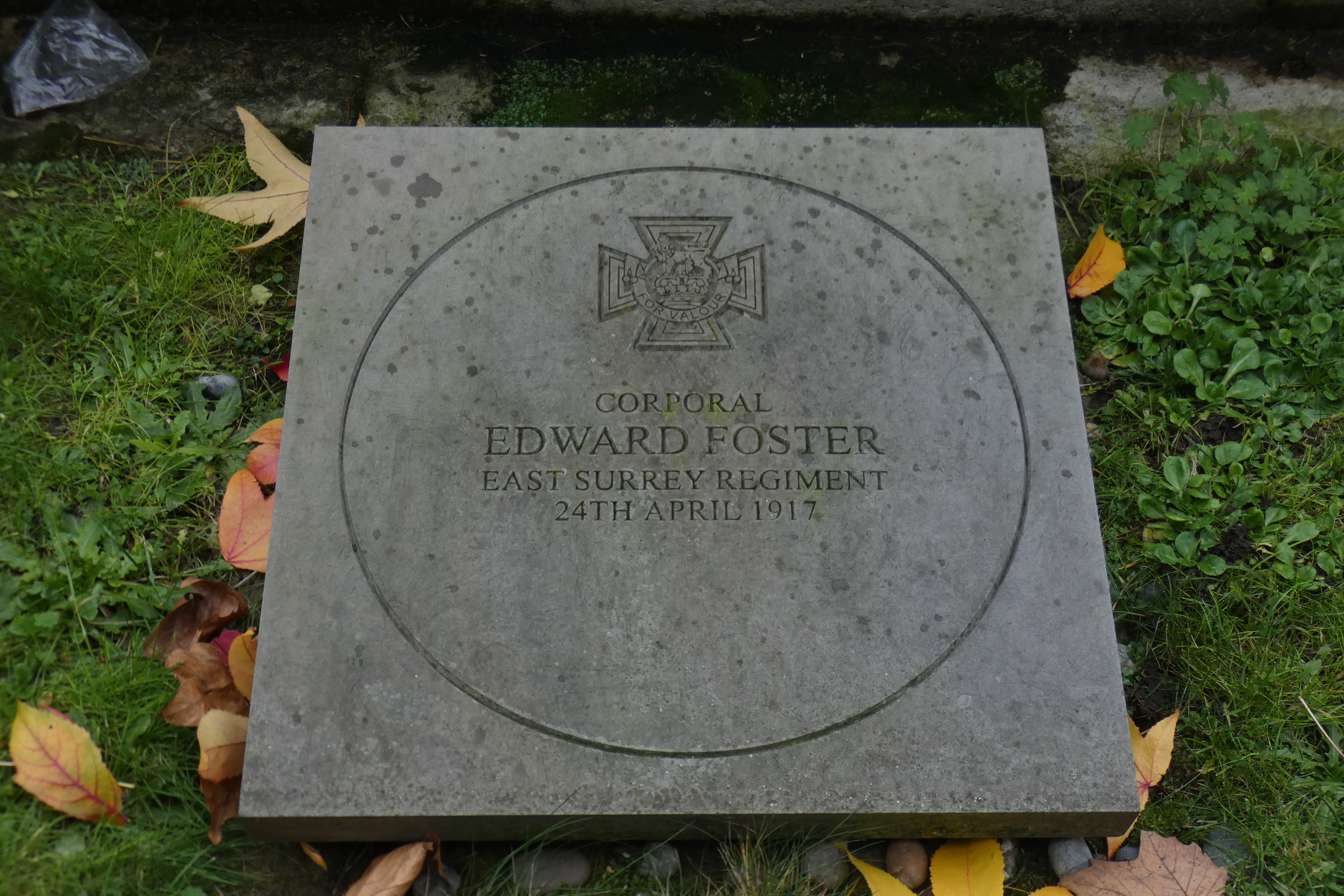
Memorial tablet at Wandsworth Town Hall to Edward Foster, VC, 13th East Surreys

13th East Surrey Regiment was commemorated in various ways. Alderman Dawnay was given the honorary rank of lieutenant-colonel and later knighted in recognition of his role in raising the battalion. All service battalions that had seen active service were granted a King's colour at the end of the war. Because of the battalion's early disbandment, it was not until 16 July 1921 that the 13th ESR's colour was presented at a ceremony on Wandsworth Common attended by around 365 veterans of the battalion. The colour was then laid up in All Saints Church, Wandsworth (it no longer survives). The East Surrey Regiment's memorial chapel is in All Saints Church, Kingston upon Thames. 40th Division's memorial is an altar in Bourlon Church dedicated on 27 May 1928 to those who died there in November 1917.

After the war the Borough of Wandsworth adopted Villers-Plouich as part of the 'League of Help' scheme, raising money to help rebuild the village that the Wandsworth Battalion had captured on 24 April 1917. The commune set a memorial tablet in the wall of the Mairie to commemorate Wandsworth's help. Relations between the two communities were revived in the 1990s in an unofficial 'twinning', and the square in front of the Mairie was renamed 'Place de Wandsworth'.

More recent memorial tablets have been placed in the garden at Wandsworth Town Hall. These include one to the 13th East Surreys, 'The Wandsworth Regulars', unveiled on 26 September 1964. The 13th and 14th (Wandsworth) Bns, East Surreys are listed on the adjacent tablet to Wandsworth Army Units 1914–45, placed on 1 February 2008. Nearby there is a VC plaque to Cpl Edward Foster and he is listed on the tablet to VC and GC winners from the borough. A new footpath through King George's Park in Wandsworth was named 'Fosters Way' in his memory on 8 May 1995.
