= 120th Brigade (United Kingdom) =

120th Brigade 120th (Highland) Brigade
- Active: 7 September 1915 – 2 May 1918; 14 June 1918–May 1919; 9 November 1943 – 16 June 1944
- Country: United Kingdom
- Branch: British Army
- Type: Infantry
- Role: Infantry and deception
- Size: Brigade

Commanders
- Notable commanders: C.S. Heathcote-Drummond-Willoughby; Hon. W.P. Hore-Ruthven (Master of Ruthven)

The 120th Brigade (120 Bde) was an infantry brigade formation of the British Army during World War I. Part of Lord Kitchener's 'New Armies', it served in the 40th Division on the Western Front. In 1918 it was reorganised as the 120th (Highland) Brigade. The brigade number was reactivated for deception purposes during World War II.

== Origin ==
120 Brigade was a New Army or 'Kitchener's Army' formation raised in September 1915, in 40th Division at Aldershot. An earlier 120 Brigade had been raised in late 1914 as part of the 'Fifth New Army', but when the Fourth New Army was broken up in April 1915 to provide reserve units for the First to Third New Armies, the formations of the Fifth took their place, and the original 120 Bde was renumbered 99th Brigade. By the time the new 120 Bde was organised the flow of volunteers had dwindled, and the standard of height for infantry soldiers had been lowered in order to encourage recruitment. Some of these so-called 'bantams' were well-knit, hardy men, but many others, especially in 120th Bde, were under-developed and unfit. It was estimated that the four battalions in the brigade would provide enough fit men for only two serviceable battalions. To prevent the departure of the division to the Front being indefinitely postponed, the divisional commander asked for fresh units to be drafted in. 120th Brigade was completely reorganised in February 1916. Divisional training was then intensified and the division was warned for overseas service in May 1916.

=== Initial order of battle ===
The original units forming 120 Bde were as follows:

- 11th (Service) Battalion, King's Own Royal Regiment (Lancaster) – formed at Lancaster August 1915 as a bantam battalion
- 13th (Service) Battalion Cameronians (Scottish Rifles) – formed at Hamilton July 1915 as a bantam battalion; absorbed into 14th Highland Light Infantry February 1916
- 12th (Service) Battalion South Lancashire Regiment – formed at Warrington June 1915 as a bantam battalion; absorbed into 11th King's Own February 1916
- 14th (Service) Battalion Highland Light Infantry – formed at Hamilton July 1915 as a bantam battalion
- 13th (Service) Battalion, East Surrey Regiment (Wandsworth) – from 118 Bde (39th Division) February 1916
- 14th (Service) Battalion Argyll and Sutherland Highlanders – from 118 Bde February 1916
- 120th Brigade Machine Gun Company – joined June 1916
- 120th Trench Mortar Battery – formed in France June 1916

== Operations ==
Disembarkation was carried out at Le Havre between 2 and 6 June, and the division concentrated in the Lillers area by 9 June ready to take its place in the line. 120 Brigade's active service was entirely spent on the Western Front. It was the first part of the division to see serious action, being engaged in the Battle of the Ancre (the last phase of the Battle of the Somme, 14–18 November 1916), detached under the command of 31st Division.

Early in 1917 the division followed up the German retreat to the Hindenburg Line, with offensive action on 24 April, when 13th East Surreys captured Villers-Plouich and over 100 prisoners, while Beaucamp was entered by 14th Argyll and Sutherland Highlanders.

=== Bourlon Wood ===
In November 1917, during the Battle of Cambrai, the division relieved 62nd (2nd West Riding) Division to continue the breakthrough. The attack on the morning of 23 November, with the objective of capturing Bourlon Wood, was begun by 119 and 121 Bdes with tank support, while 120 Bde was in reserve. Confused fighting went on for two days and nights, with troops from 120 Bde being gradually fed into the line. On the afternoon of 24 November 14th Bn Highland Light Infantry of 120 Bde together with some tanks attacked Bourlon village; although the HLI fought their way through the village, they became cut off on the other side. 40th Division ordered a renewed attack the following morning to break through and relieve them. The only troops available to 121 Bde for this task were the uncommitted 13th East Surreys from 120 Bde. The East Surreys attacked around dawn, made contact with the HLI battalion HQ, but were unable to get through to the HLI companies furthest forward, who were forced to surrender. In the two days the division suffered over 4000 casualties, and Heathcote-Drummond-Willoughby's battalions had been badly damaged while under the command of others.

== Reorganisation ==
In February 1918, British brigades were reduced to a three-battalion basis and brigade machine gun companies were combined into divisional battalions. 40th Division had lost so heavily in late 1917 that a more extensive reorganisation was required, leading to the following order of battle for 120 Bde, which was henceforth sometimes referred to as 120th (Highland) Brigade:

- 10th/11th Bn Highland Light Infantry – from 15th (Scottish) Division
- 14th Bn Highland Light Infantry
- 14th Bn Argyll and Sutherland Highlanders
- 120th Trench Mortar Battery

120 Bde saw heavy action during the German spring offensive of 1918:

- Battle of St Quentin 21–23 March
- First Battle of Bapaume 24–25 March
- Battle of Estaires 9–11 April
- Battle of Hazebrouck 12–13 April

Following heavy casualties during these battles, 40th Division was reduced to two composite brigades. 10/11th and 14th Highland Light Infantry from 120 Bde combined to form C Bn of 2nd Composite Bde. (14th Argylls had already been reduced to a cadre and transferred to 30th Division on 7 April.)

2nd Composite Bde was employed on digging the Poperinghe Line behind the threatened Ypres Salient. In early May 1918, all of 40th Division's remaining infantry battalions were reduced to training cadres and were posted to other formations while the trench mortar batteries disbanded.

== Reconstituted ==
On 10 June 1918, 120 Bde was reconstituted with six Garrison Guard Battalions. Three of these were immediately transferred to 119 Bde and the remainder formed 120 Bde and were redesignated as Garrison Battalions of their parent regiments:

- No 6 Garrison Guard Bn, became 11th (Garrison) Bn Cameron Highlanders
- No 9 Garrison Guard Bn, became 10th (Garrison) Bn King's Own Scottish Borderers
- No 10 Garrison Guard Bn, became 15th (Garrison) Bn King's Own Yorkshire Light Infantry

On 13 July the term 'Garrison' was dropped from the battalion titles, and the brigade light trench mortar battery had been reformed. By 18 July the brigade resumed its place in the Front Line. It then took part in the following operations of the Hundred Days Offensive in 1918:

- Final Advance in Flanders, 28 September–19 October; 27 October–10 November
- Fifth Battle of Ypres 28 September–2 October

After the Armistice with Germany, the division was engaged in road repair and refresher courses for men returning to civilian trades. Demobilisation proceeded rapidly during January and February 1919, and its units were reduced to cadre strength by March. The final cadres disappeared during May.

== Commanders ==
The following officers commanded 120 Brigade during the war:

- Brigadier-General C.S. Heathcote-Drummond-Willoughby (from 7 September 1915)
- Brigadier-General C.J. Hobkirk (from 15 March 1918)
- Brigadier-General Hon. W.P. Hore-Ruthven (Master of Ruthven) (from 18 October 1918)

== Second World War ==
120 Brigade was never reformed, but the number was used for deception purposes during the Second World War. 30th Battalion Dorsetshire Regiment, a line of communication unit serving in 43rd Brigade in Sicily and composed mainly of men below Medical Category 'A', was redesignated '120th Infantry Brigade' and acted as if it were a full brigade in an equally fictitious '40th Infantry Division' from November 1943 until June 1944.

== External sources ==
- The Long, Long Trail
- Commonwealth War Graves Commission
