= Charles Heathcote-Drummond-Willoughby =

British Army general (1870-1949)

Brigadier-General The Honourable Charles Heathcote-Drummond-Willoughby CB CMG
- Born: Charles Strathavon Heathcote-Drummond-Willoughby; 18 May 1870; London, England
- Died: 15 December 1949 (aged 79); Hampstead, London, England
- Burial place: East Halton, Lincolnshire
- Relatives: 1st Earl of Ancaster (father); 2nd Earl of Ancaster (brother); Claud Heathcote-Drummond-Willoughby (brother)
- Military career
- Allegiance: United Kingdom
- Branch: British Army
- Service years: 1888–1919
- Rank: Brigadier-General
- Nickname: Charlie
- Unit: Scots Guards
- Commands: Civil Service Rifles; 142nd (6th London) Brigade; 120th Brigade
- Conflicts: Second Boer War; World War I
- Awards: Order of the Bath; Order of St Michael and St George

Brigadier-General Charles Strathavon Heathcote-Drummond-Willoughby, CB, CMG (18 May 1870 – 15 December 1949) was a British Army officer in the Second Boer War and World War I.

== Early life ==
Charles Strathavon Heathcote-Drummond Willoughby (pronounced 'Hethcut-Drummond-Willowby') was born on 18 May 1870, the second son of Gilbert Henry Heathcote-Drummond-Willoughby, 2nd Lord Aveland, and his wife Lady Evelyn Elizabeth Gordon, daughter of the 10th Marquess of Huntly. Lord Aveland later succeeded his mother as Lord Willougby d'Eresby, and was created Earl of Ancaster in 1892. As the younger son of a peer, Charles bore the courtesy title 'The Honourable'. The Conservative politicians Gilbert, 2nd Earl of Ancaster and Lt-Col Claud Heathcote-Drummond-Willoughby were his brothers. He was educated at Eton and Trinity College, Cambridge.

== Early military career ==
In March 1888, Heathcote-Drummond-Willoughy obtained a commission as a part-time Militia officer in the 4th Battalion Lincolnshire Regiment (Royal South Lincolnshire Militia), and then in January 1890 transferred to the Regular Army as a Second lieutenant in the Scots Guards. He was promoted to lieutenant 11 August 1894, and captain on 7 June 1899.

He was serving with the 2nd Battalion, Scots Guards, when the Second Boer War broke out in October 1899.

== Second Boer War ==
The 2nd Scots Guards left Southampton on the SS Britannic in March 1900, arrived in South Africa as reinforcements the following month, and soon took part in operations in the Orange River Colony. Heathcote-Drummond-Willoughby was present at the actions of Biddulphsberg and Wittenbergen. Early in 1901 he served briefly as an extra Aide-de-camp to the British High Commissioner, Sir Alfred Milner. Heathcote-Drummond-Willoughby became Adjutant of the 2nd Scots Guards in December 1901, and was present with the battalion during further operations in the Transvaal and Orange River Colony until the Boer surrender on 31 May 1902.

== Inter-war years ==
For his service during the war he was promoted to brevet major on 22 August 1902. He left Port Natal on the SS Michigan with other men of the 2nd Battalion, Scots Guards, in late September 1902, arriving at Southampton in late October, when the battalion was posted to Aldershot. He then returned to the role of Aide-de-Camp to Milner (now Lord Milner) in South Africa until the end of 1903. Returning to his regiment in London, Heathcote-Drummond-Willoughby was promoted to the substantive rank of major in 1904.

In 1904 Heathcote-Drummond-Willoughby was made commandant of the School of Instruction for Officers of the Auxiliary Forces. Based at Chelsea Barracks, this provided training for the part-time officers of the Militia, Yeomanry and Volunteers. When he retired from the army in June 1908, he did not sever his military connections, but became an officer in the new Territorial Force (TF) created from the former Yeomanry and Volunteers under the Haldane Reforms. From 1908 until 1912 he was commanding officer (CO) of the 15th (County of London) Battalion, the London Regiment (TF). On 11 April 1912 he became commander of the 6th London Infantry Brigade with the rank of colonel (TF). The brigade comprised four South London battalions (21st–24th) of the London Regiment and formed part of the 2nd London Division.

== First World War ==
On the outbreak of the First World War, the 6th London Brigade was mobilised and Heathcote-Drummond-Willoughby was appointed as a temporary brigadier general. In October the 2nd London Division was selected for service on the Western Front and progressive training was carried out through the winter. The division embarked for France in March 1915, concentrating round Béthune. In May the division (already known in France simply as 'The London Division' to distinguish it from the Regular Army 2nd Division) took its place in the line and was designated 47th (1/2nd London) Division, with the brigades numbered consecutively: 6th London became 142nd (1/6th London) Brigade. Heathcote-Drummond-Willoughby's 142 Bde carried out the division's first offensive action, on 25 May during the Battle of Festubert. The leading battalions swept across the open ground and immediately captured the German front trenches with few losses, but were then caught by enfilading fire from German artillery and suffered heavy casualties, as did the supports sent up to consolidate the gains.

Heathcote-Drummond-Willoughby went on sick leave on 10 June 1915, and did not return to 142 Brigade. He was replaced on 14 August, but on 7 September he was appointed to command a new brigade, 120th, in 40th Division, forming at Aldershot. This was one of the last of the 'Kitchener Army' divisions to be formed, and the standard of height for infantry soldiers had been lowered in order to encourage volunteers: some of these so-called 'bantams' were well-knit, hardy men, but many others, especially in 120th Bde, were under-developed and unfit. It was estimated that the four battalions in the brigade would provide enough fit men for only two serviceable battalions. To prevent the departure of the division to the Front being indefinitely postponed, the divisional commander asked for fresh units to be drafted in. Consequently, Heathcote-Drummond-Willoughby had to carry out a complete reorganisation of his command in February 1916. Divisional training was then intensified and the division was warned for overseas service in May 1916.

40th Division disembarked in France in June 1916, and spent the whole war on the Western Front. Heathcote-Drummond-Willoughby's brigade was the first part of the division to see serious action, being engaged in the Battle of the Ancre (the last phase of the Battle of the Somme, 14–18 November 1916), detached under the command of 31st Division.

Early in 1917 the division followed up the German retreat to the Hindenburg Line, with offensive action 24 April, when 120 Bde captured Villers-Plouich and Beaucamp. Villers-Plouich and over 300 prisoners were captured by 13th Bn East Surrey Regiment and Beaucamp entered by 14th Bn Argyll and Sutherland Highlanders.

In November 1917, during the Battle of Cambrai, the division relieved 62nd (2nd West Riding) Division to continue the breakthrough. The attack on the morning of 23 November, with the objective of capturing Bourlon Wood, was begun by 119 and 121 Bdes with tank support, while 120 Bde was in reserve. Confused fighting went on for two days and nights, with Heathcote-Drummond-Willoughby feeding his troops gradually into the line. On the afternoon of 24 November, the 14th Highland Light Infantry of the 120th Brigade together with some tanks attacked Bourlon village; although the HLI fought their way through the village, they became cut off on the other side. 40th Division ordered a renewed attack the following morning to break through and relieve them. The only troops available to 121 Bde for this task were the uncommitted 13th East Surreys from 120 Bde. The East Surreys attacked around dawn, made contact with the HLI battalion HQ, but were unable to get through to the HLI companies furthest forward, who were forced to surrender. In the two days the division suffered over 4000 casualties, and Heathcote-Drummond-Willoughby's battalions had been badly damaged while under the command of others.

All brigades on the Western Front were reorganised after the heavy losses of 1917. Heathcote-Drummond-Willoughby's brigade lost its English battalions and became an entirely Scottish formation as it prepared for renewed fighting in 1918. The divisional history records that 120 Brigade 'suffered a severe loss on the 15th [March 1918] when the brigade commander was sent home. General Willoughby had been in very poor health for some time, but had struggled to remain at his duty in order to see the big [German] offensive, though the delay in the opening of the attack rendered this impossible'. To the regret of his divisional commander, Major General John Ponsonby, Heathcote–Drummond-Willoughby was invalided back to the UK after two-and-a-half years in continuous command. His brigade was virtually destroyed during the subsequent German spring offensive.

Having been made a CMG in January 1916, Heathcote-Drummond-Willoughby was awarded a CB in the New Year Honours of 1918.

== Post-war years ==
On demobilisation he was granted the honorary rank of brigadier general on 4 March 1919.

After the war he was a popular Chairman of the Turf Club in London.

== Family life ==
Heathcote-Drummond-Willoughy married at St. Mark Church, North Audley street, Westminster, on 7 January 1903 Lady Muriel Agnes Stuart Erskine, eldest daughter of the 14th Earl of Buchan. They had two children:

- Charles Peregrine Heathcote-Drummond-Willoughy, b 13 September 1905.
- Rosalie Heathcote-Drummond-Willoughy, b 10 July 1908, married on 25 April 1935 Lt-Col Sir Terence Nugent (1895–1973), who was created Baron Nugent in 1960. Nugent was the son of Brig.-Gen. G.C. Nugent, who had commanded 141st Brigade alongside Heathcote-Drummond-Willoughy's 142nd Brigade in 47th Division, and had been killed in action 31 May 1915. Rosalie, Lady Nugent died in July 1994.

Brigadier-General Hon. Charles Strathavon Heathcote-Drummond-Willoughby died on 15 December 1949. He is buried alongside many members of his family in St Michael's Churchyard, East Halton, Lincolnshire.

== Awards ==
- CB (1918)
- CMG (1916)
