= Edward Foster (VC) =

English Victoria Cross recipient (1886-1946)

- Born: 4 January 1886; Streatham, London
- Died: 22 January 1946 (aged 60); Tooting, London
- Burial place: Streatham Cemetery
- Military career
- Allegiance: United Kingdom
- Branch: British Army
- Service years: 1915 - 1918
- Rank: Corporal
- Nickname: Tiny
- Units: 13th Battalion (Wandsworth) East Surrey Regiment
- Conflicts: World War I
- Awards: Victoria Cross; Médaille Militaire (France)

Edward Foster VC (4 January 1886 – 22 January 1946) was an English recipient of the Victoria Cross, the highest and most prestigious award for gallantry in the face of the enemy that can be awarded to British and Commonwealth forces.

Born in Streatham, London on 4 February 1886, Foster worked for Wandsworth Council in South West London as a dustman. On 27 July 1915, during the First World War, he enlisted in the 13th Battalion (Wandsworth) East Surrey Regiment, British Army, and went to France with the battalion in June 1916.

Foster was 31 years old, and a corporal in the 13th East Surreys, when the following deed took place for which he was awarded the VC.

On 24 April 1917 at Villers-Plouich, Nord, France, during an attack, the advance was held up in a portion of the village by two machine-guns which were entrenched and strongly covered by wire entanglements. Corporal Foster, who was in charge of two Lewis guns, succeeded in entering the trench and engaging the enemy guns. One of the Lewis guns was lost, but the corporal rushed forward, bombed the enemy and recovered the gun. Then, getting his two guns into action, he killed the enemy gun team and captured their guns.

Foster was also awarded the Médaille Militaire by France.

Foster was discharged from the Army in October 1918 and returned to work with Wandsworth Council. The council, in recognition of his gallant record, promoted him to Dusting Inspector in which capacity he continued to work for twenty-six years. He died suddenly at the age of 60 on 22 January 1946. He is buried in Streatham Cemetery in London where a headstone was erected on his grave in 1997.

His Victoria Cross and other medals were sold by Sotheby's on 30 June 1988 for £11,000. His VC is now on display in the Lord Ashcroft Gallery at the Imperial War Museum, London.

A footpath in King George's Park – Foster's Way – is named in Foster's honour.

== Honours ==

Ribbon	Description	Notes
	Victoria Cross (VC)	27 June 1917.
	British War Medal	26 July 1919.
	World War I Victory Medal	1 September 1919.
	King George VI Coronation Medal	12 May 1937.; Qualified as a Victoria Cross Recipient.
	Médaille militaire	13 July 1917.; Awarded by the 3rd French Republic.
