= Villers-Plouich =

- Commune
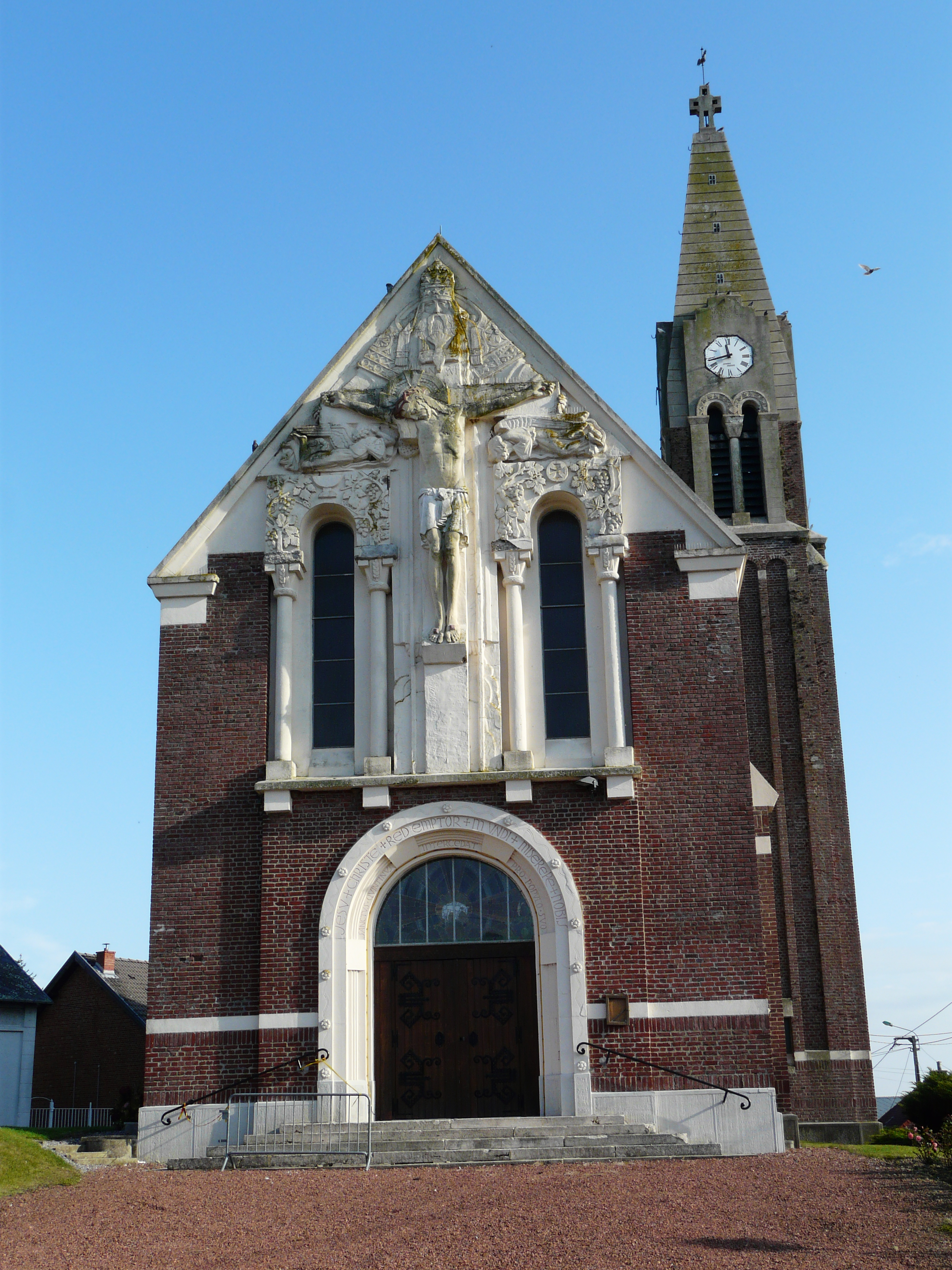
- The church in Villers-Plouich

- Coat of arms
- Location of Villers-Plouich
- Location within France Location within Hauts-de-France
- Coordinates: 50°04′47″N 3°08′06″E
- Country: France
- Region: Hauts-de-France
- Department: Nord
- Arrondissement: Cambrai
- Canton: Le Cateau-Cambrésis
- Intercommunality: CA Cambrai

Government
  - Mayor (2020–2026): Pascal Bruniaux
- Area^{1}: 10.97 km^{2} (4.24 sq mi)
- Elevation: 80 m (260 ft)
- Highest elevation: 131 m (430 ft)
- Lowest elevation: 78 m (256 ft)
- Population (2023): 390
  - Density: 36/km^{2} (92/sq mi)
- Time zone: UTC+01:00 (CET)
  - Summer (DST): UTC+02:00 (CEST)
- INSEE/Postal code: 59625 /59231
- ^{1} French Land Register data, which excludes lakes, ponds, glaciers > 1 km^{2} (0.386 sq mi or 247 acres) and river estuaries.

Villers-Plouich (French pronunciation: [vilɛʁ plui]) is a commune in the Nord department in northern France, situated 14 km south-west of the town of Cambrai.

== Geography ==
The commune of has evolved over time to consist of the main village centre and two separate hamlets:

- Beaucamp lies 1.5 km to the west of the village centre, and consists of about twenty dwellings
- La Vacquerie lies 2.5 km to the east of the village centre, and contains about 35 dwellings, a church and a cemetery

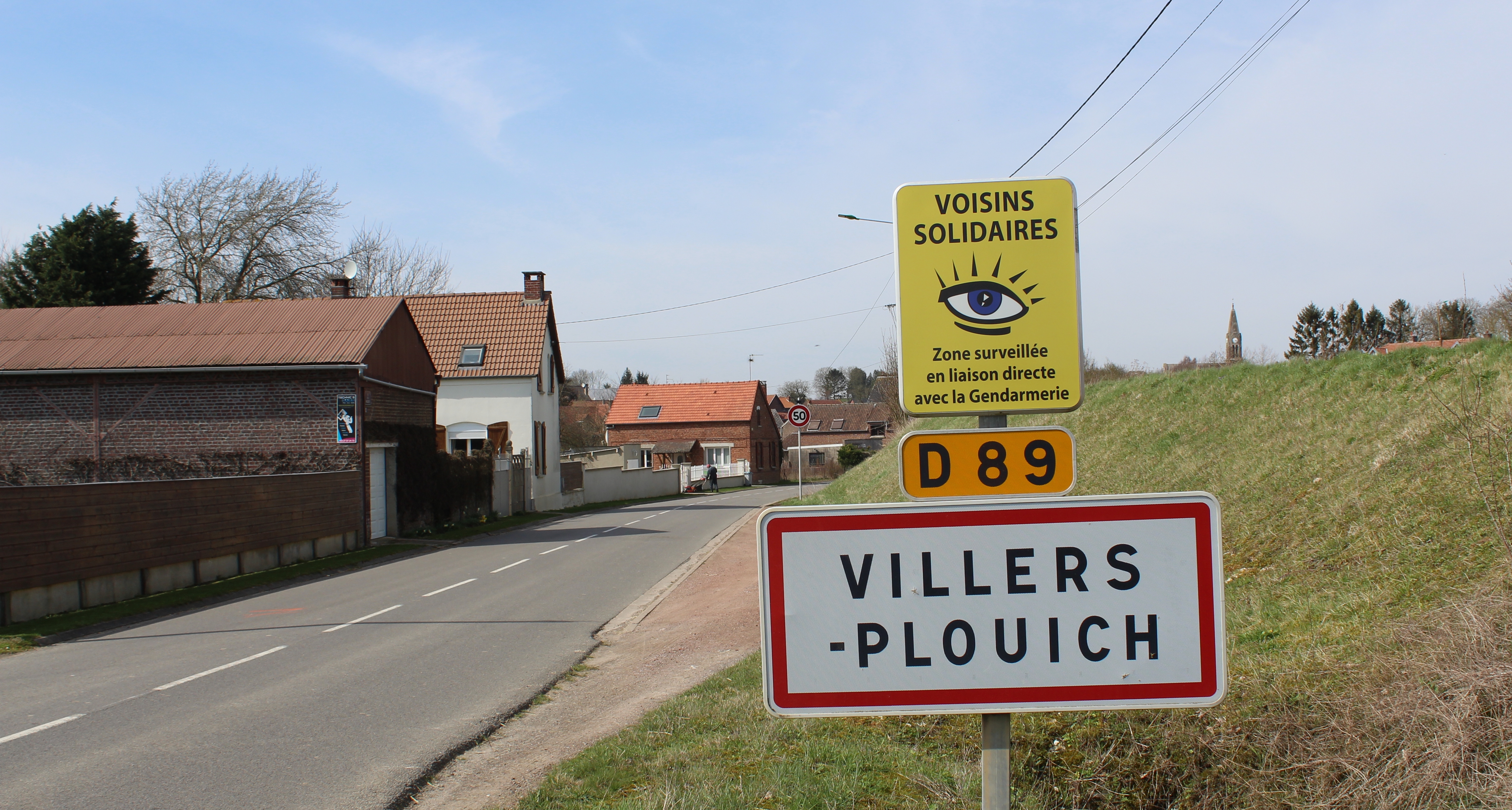
Village approach

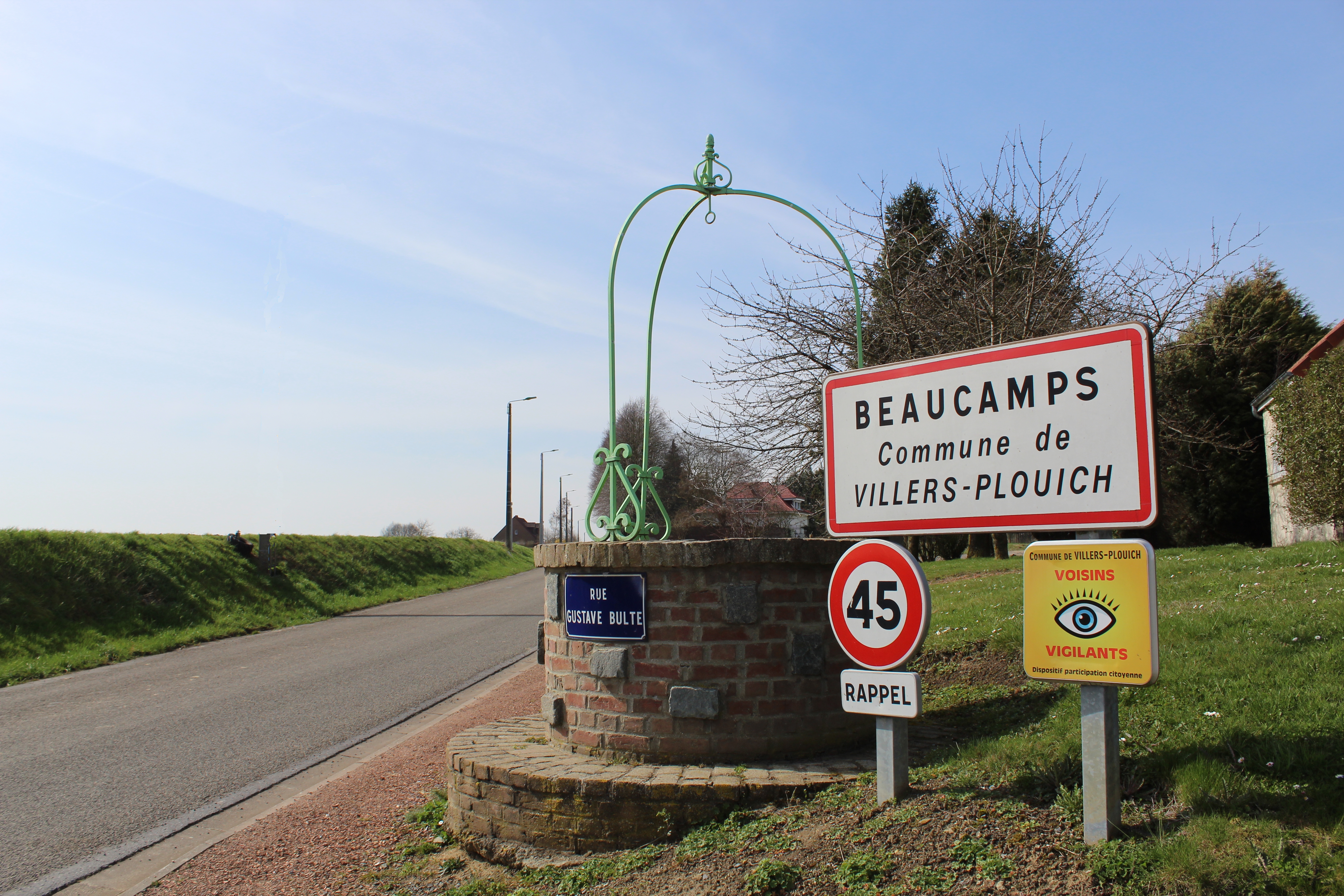
Entrance to Beauchamps

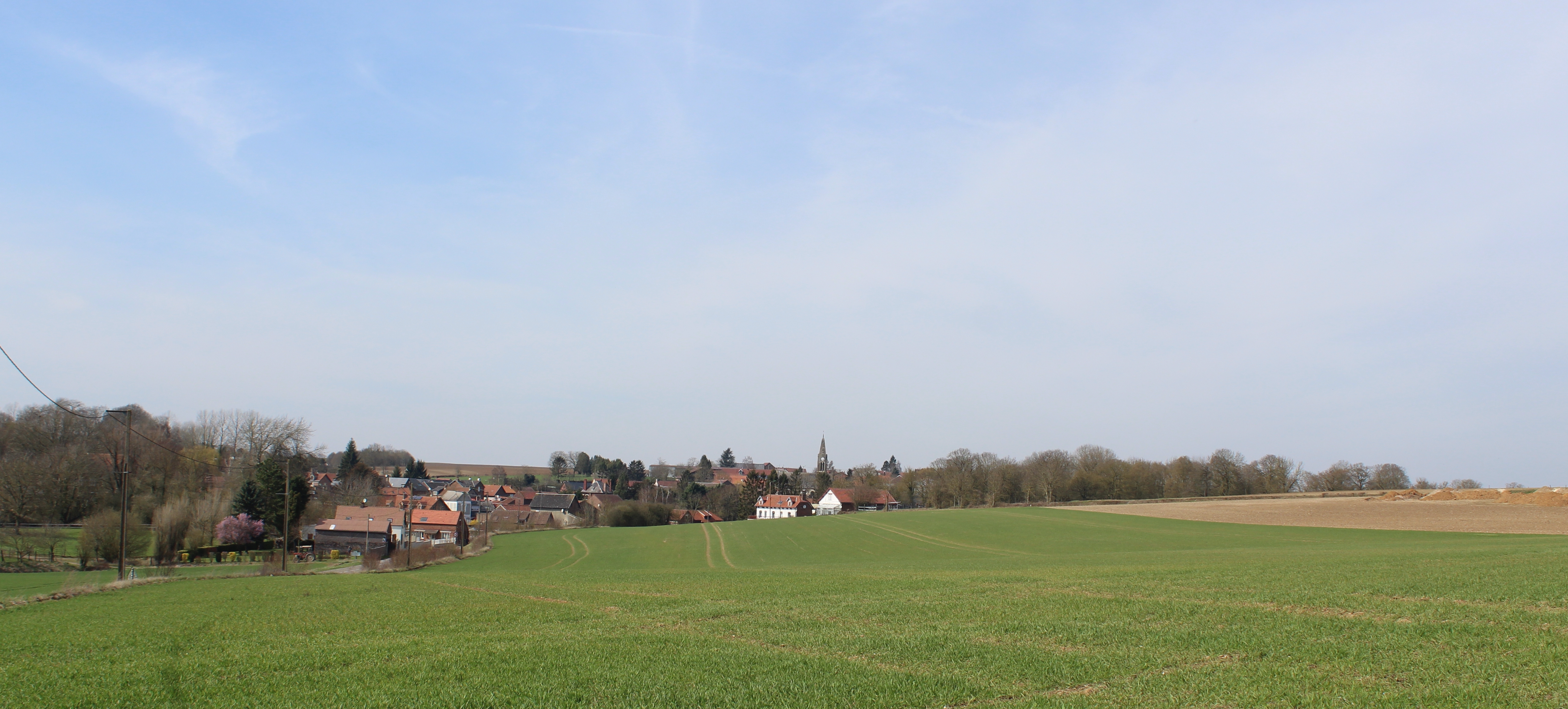
Panorama

== History ==
Church records for the commune date back to the 12th Century, though the regular discovery of tools from the prehistoric period, and of several Gallo-Roman sites in the vicinity suggest much earlier human occupation. By the 19th Century, the village boasted a grinding mill, a brewery and a railway station.

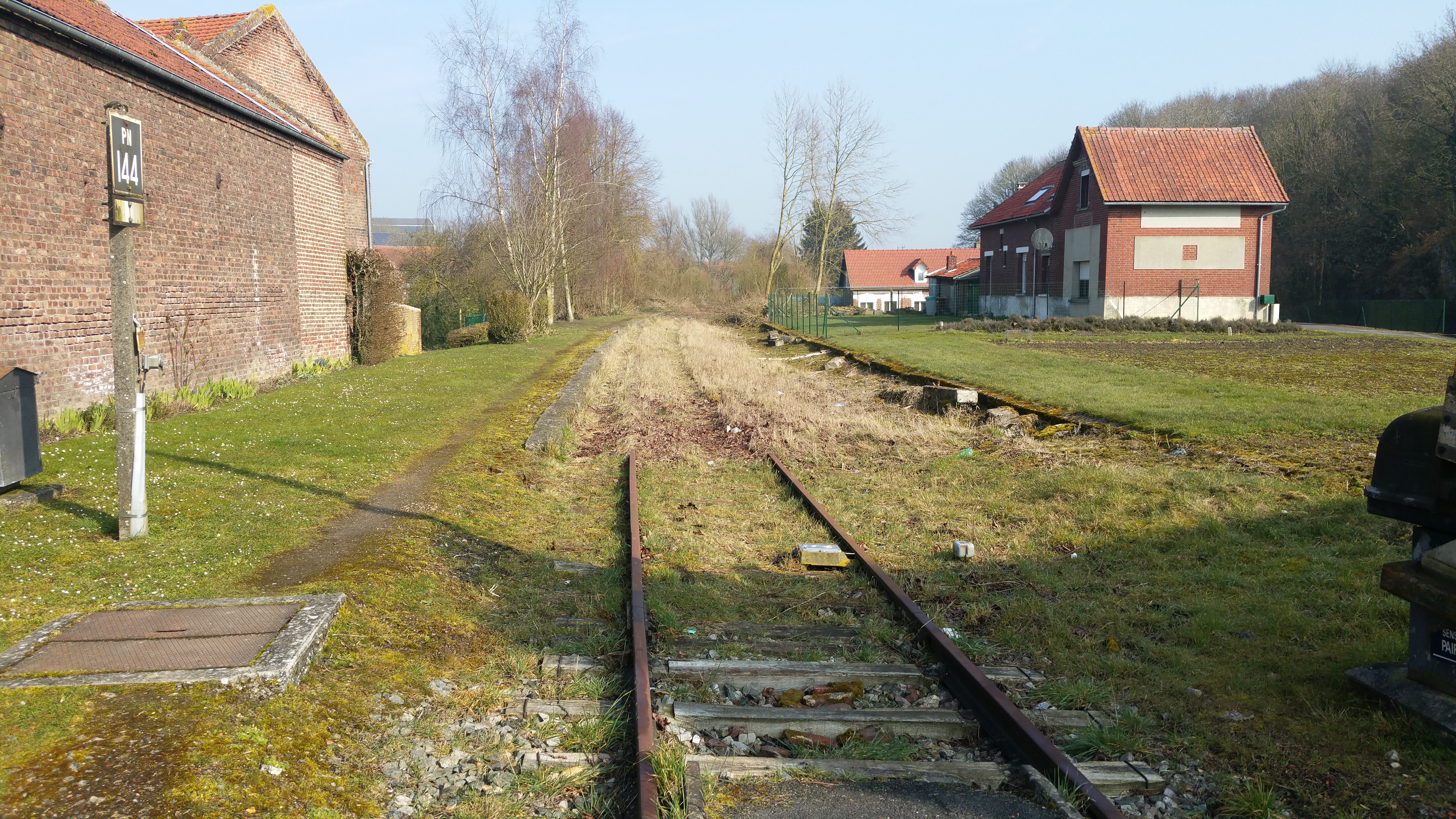
Site of the old railway station

The commune was the scene of intense and prolonged trench warfare during the First World War, notably during the Battle of Cambrai in 1917, and in the approach to the Battle of the Canal du Nord in 1918. The hamlet of La Vacquerie lay on the Hindenburg Line. By the end of hostilities in 1918, the entire commune was almost completely destroyed.

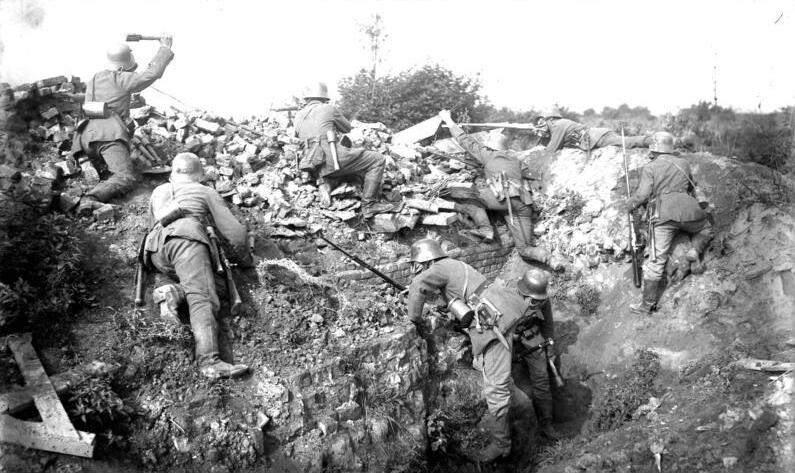
According to the description of this photo from German archives, these soldiers are positioned in battle at La Vacquerie

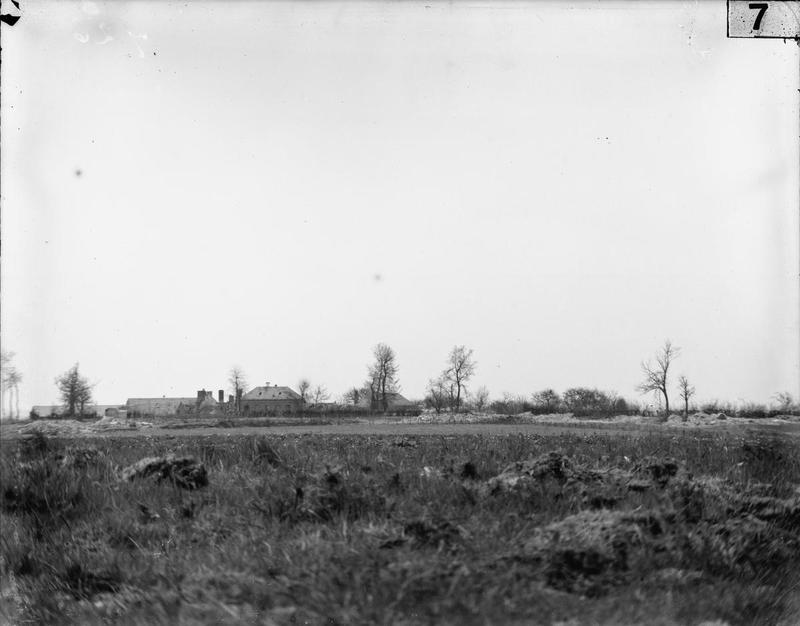
Panorama sourced from the Imperial War Museum archives, taken near La Vacquerie

The village was rebuilt in the subsequent years, and is known today for its two impressive twentieth century churches, and as a producer of Belgian endive. As of 2017 a team of de-miners still visited the area two times per year, to safely dispose of munitions found by local farmers.

== Heritage ==
Both churches, built during the years of reconstruction following the Great War, were designed by Pierre Leprince-Ringuet (winner of the 'Grand Prix de Rome'), and feature external sculpturing by Marcel Gaumont.

The church of Saint-Quentin, is located in the village centre and the church of Saint Joseph is at La Vacquerie.

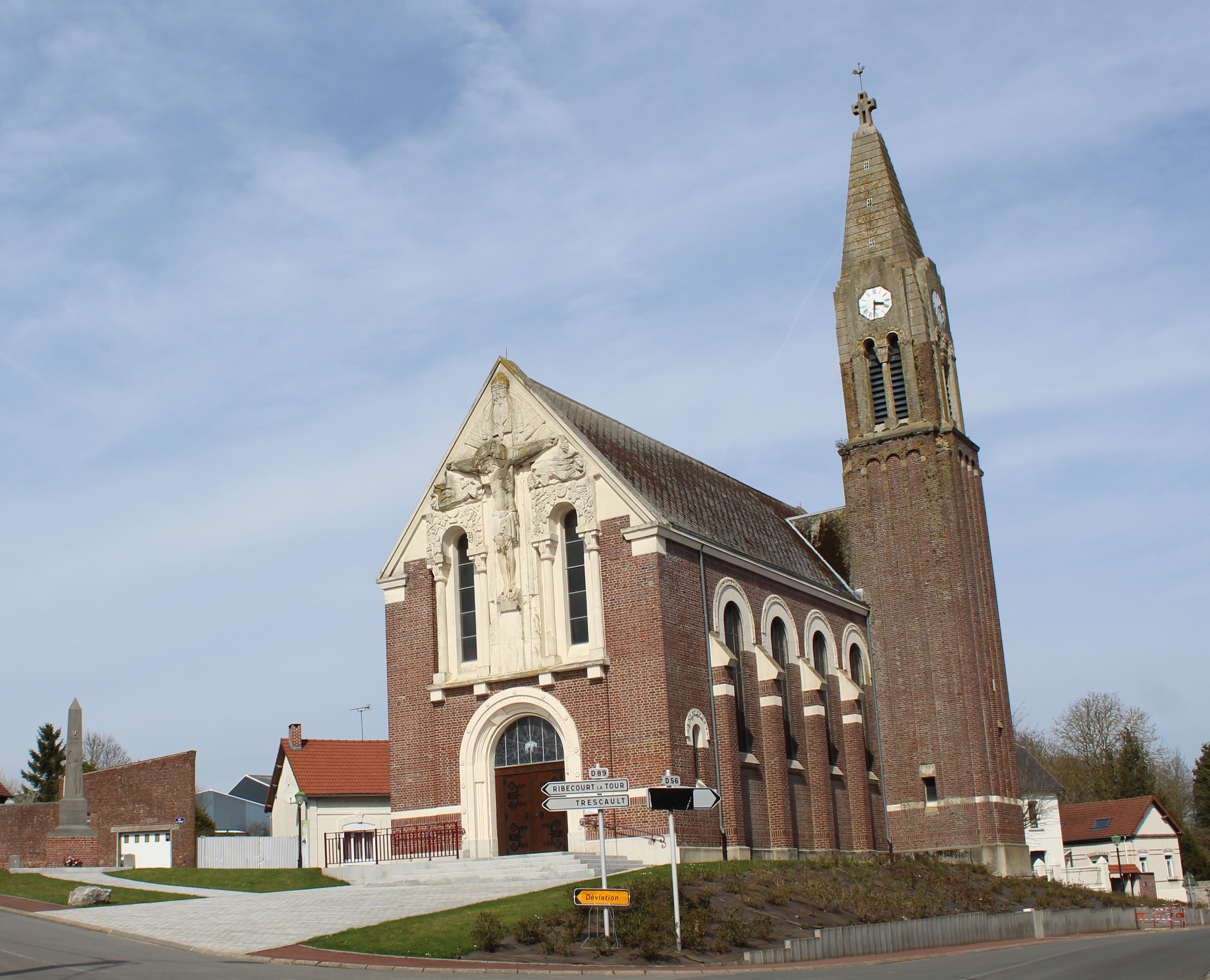
The church of Saint-Quentin

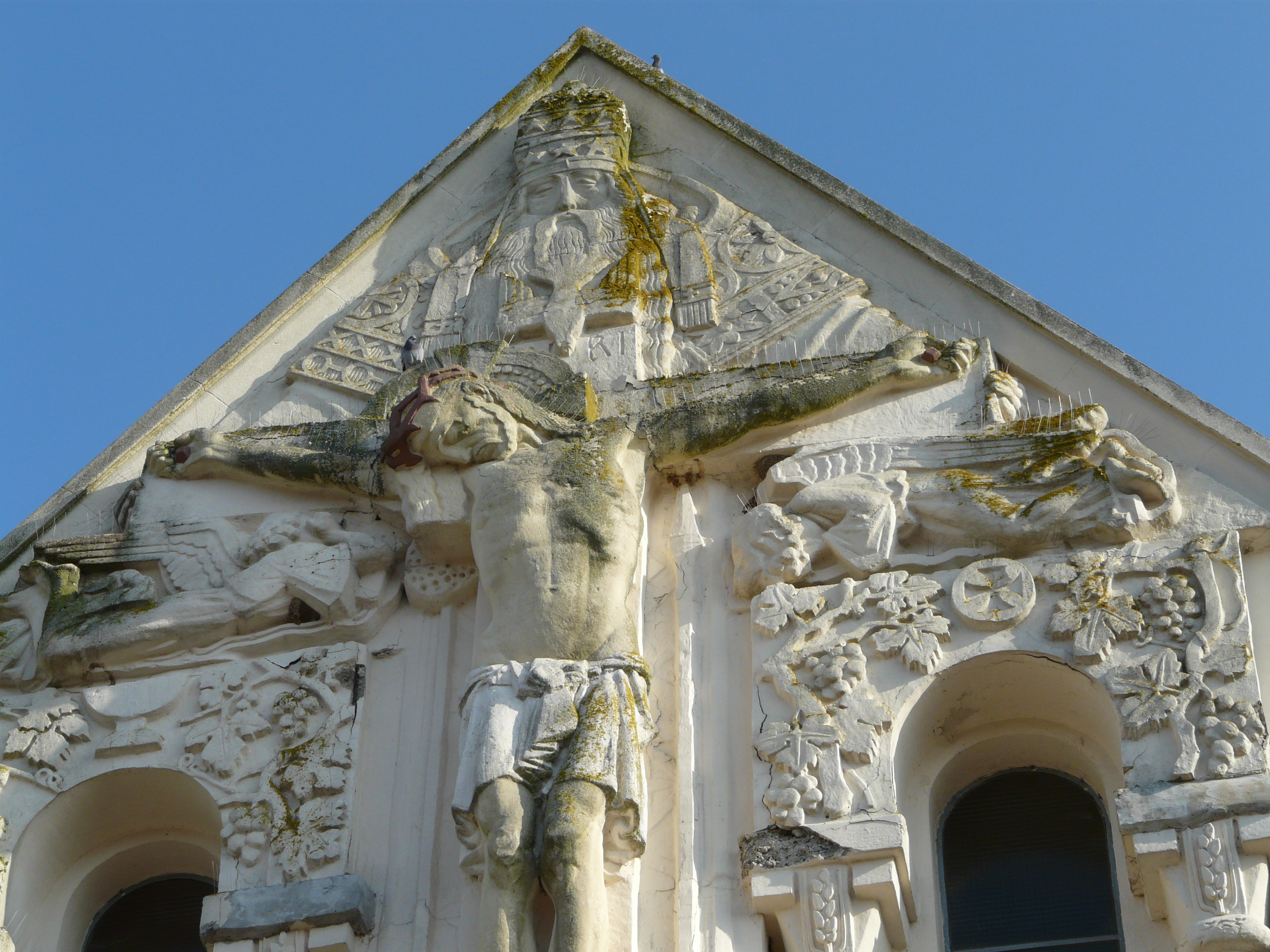
Sculpture on the church of Saint-Quentin

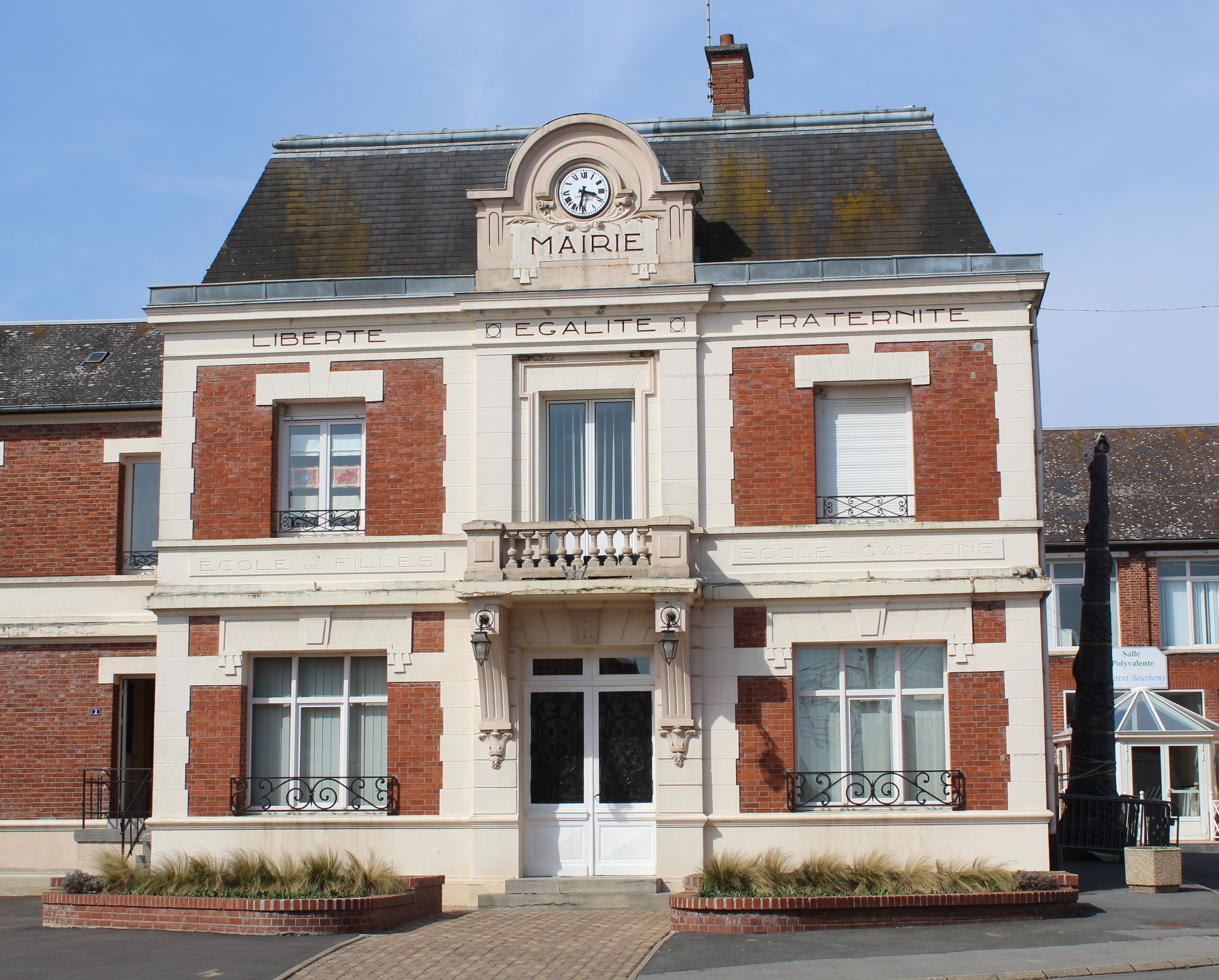
The 'Mairie'

Outside the 'Mairie' (municipal hall), on 'Place de Wandsworth', stands a British red telephone box, which was installed to commemorate the centenary of the Armistice. The commune has a school, a community hall, two football pitches, and two areas for pétanque. The village has an active community Facebook page with regular coverage of local events.

Multiple improvement projects are envisaged - the creation of a communal garden and orchard, the restoration of two distinctive pigeon towers and the construction of improved flood defences.

The production of Belgian endive was established in the 1940s. Traditionally grown in the surrounding fields as a winter vegetable, the more recent establishment of an indoor 'salle de forçage' facility enables production all year round, and provides employment for about 25 workers from the surrounding area. The cultivation of field-grown endives is now regarded as a delicacy.

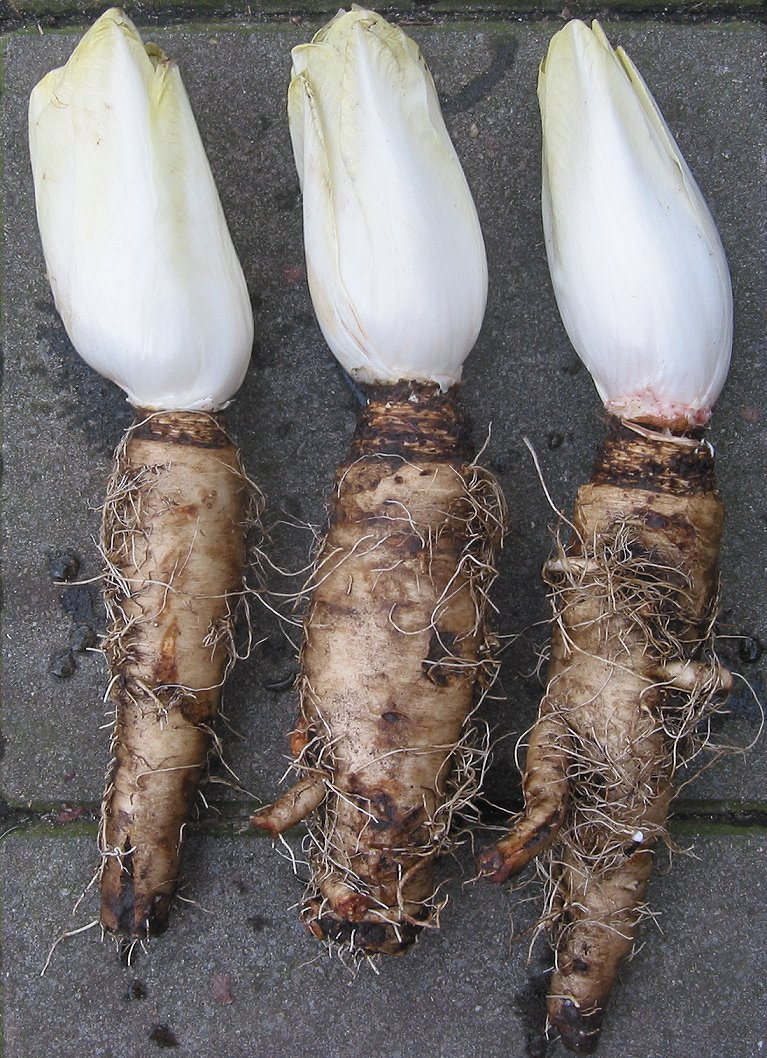
Belgian endive

A prominent war memorial is located in the village centre. There are three cemeteries with British military graves within the commune - the Fifteen Ravine Cemetery, the Communal Cemetery and the Sunken Road Cemetery.

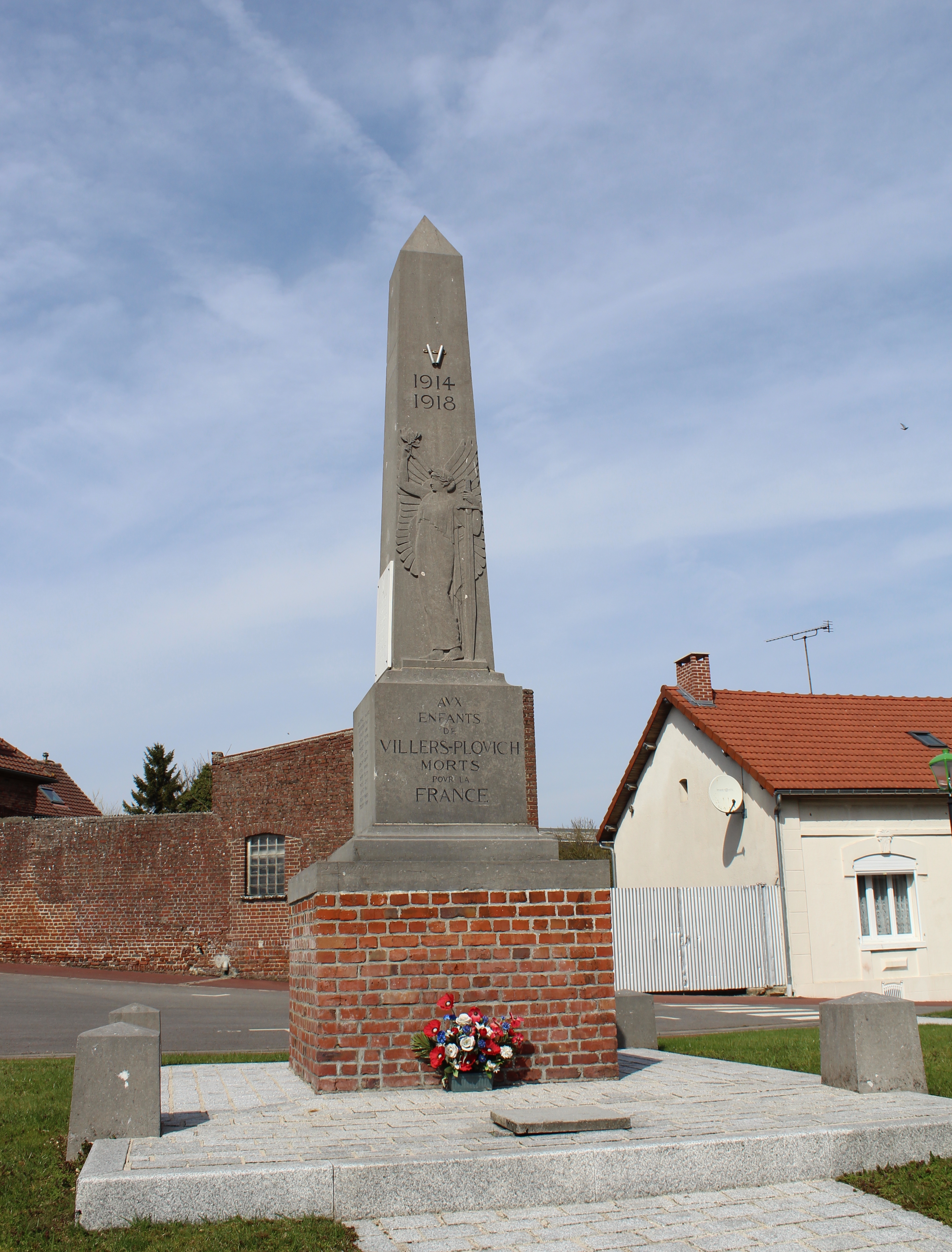
The War Memorial

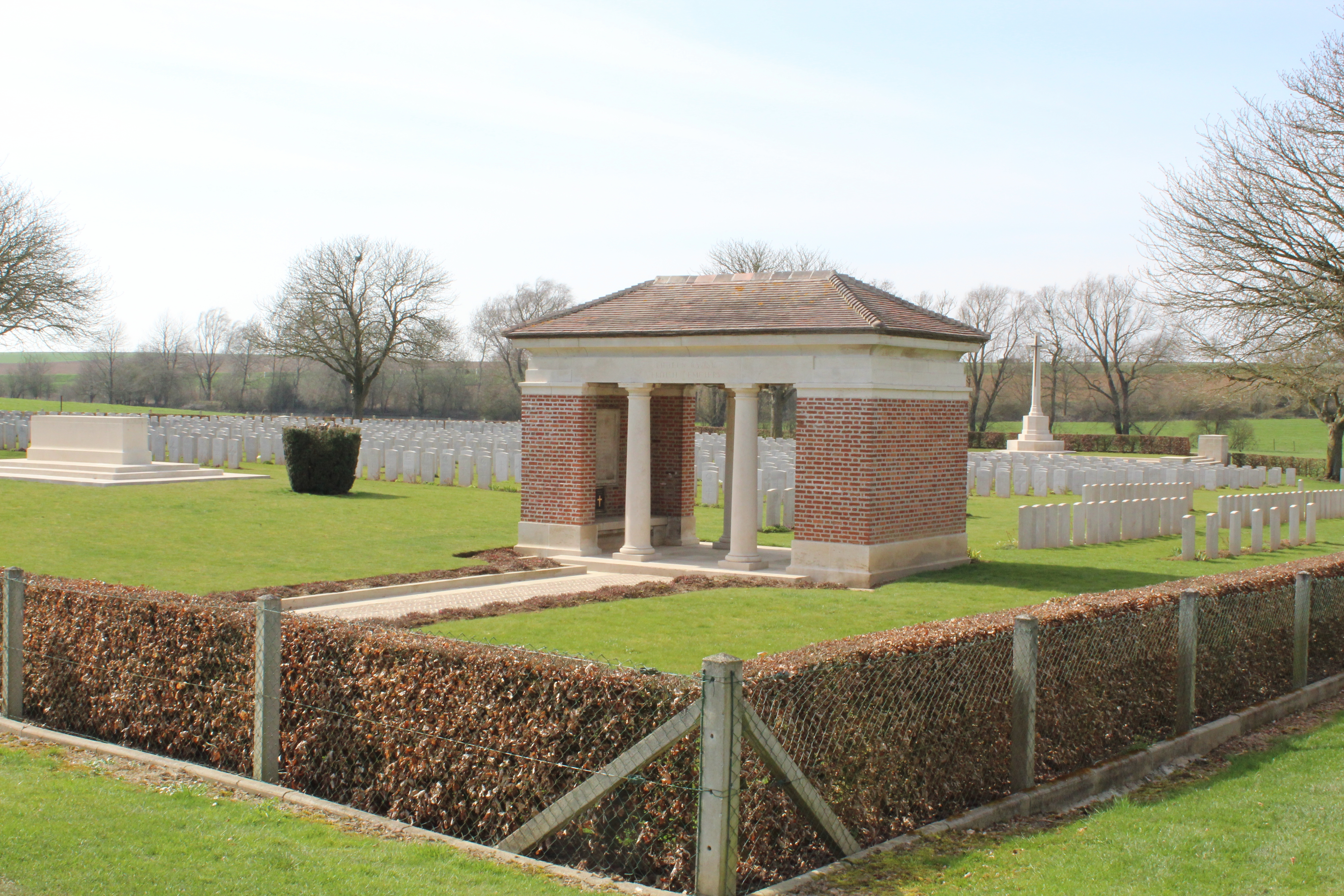
The Fifteen Ravine Cemetery

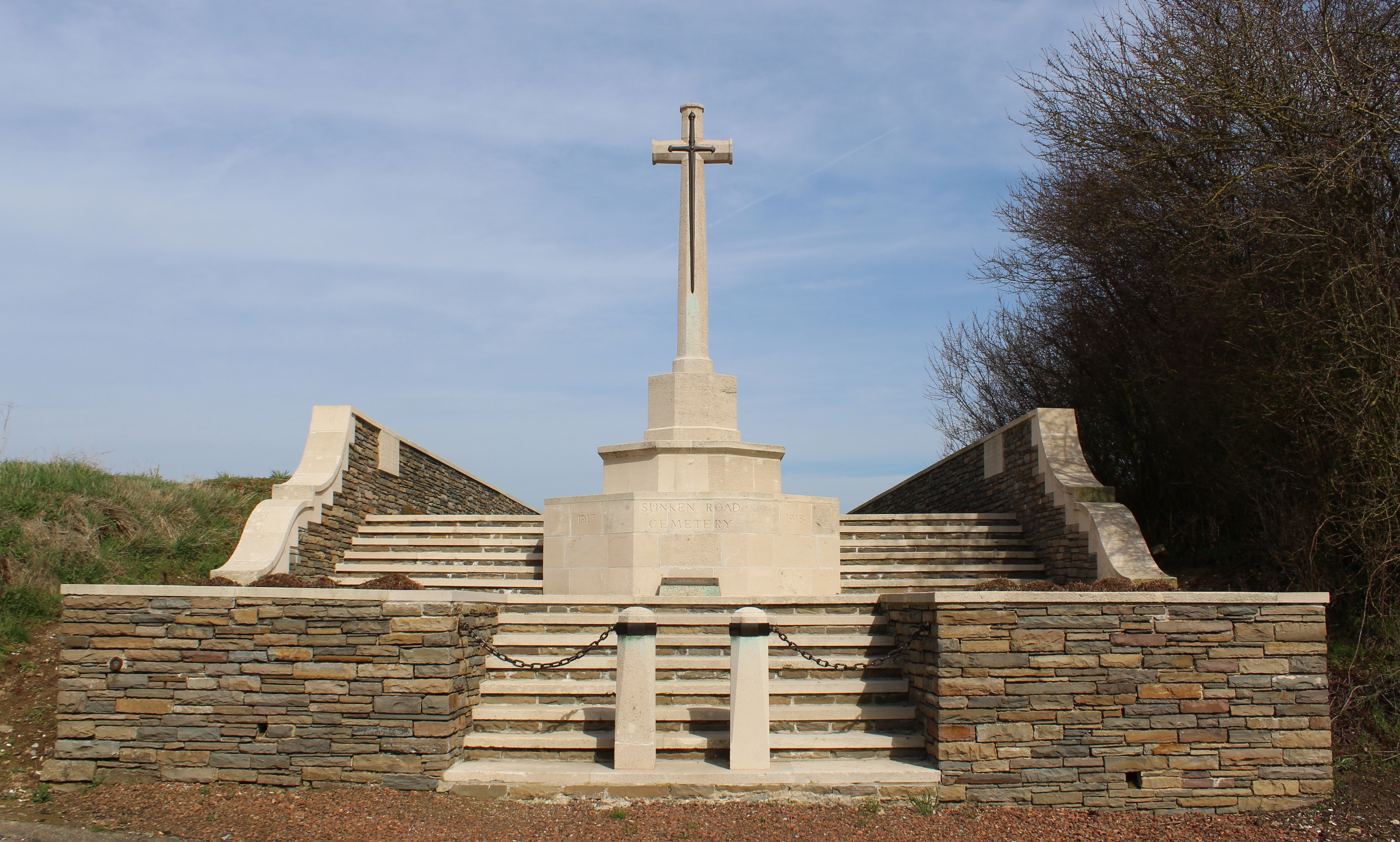
The Sunken Road Cemetery

== Flooding in 2008 ==
On the evening of 11 September 2008 a major storm caused severe flooding in Villers-Plouich and the surrounding communes, making it impossible to enter or leave the village, and tragically a fatality was reported in the commune. The valley terrain of the village serves to increase its exposure to such events.

== Links to the Borough of Wandsworth, London ==
Villers-Plouich is informally twinned with the Borough of Wandsworth in London. This association dates back to World War I, following the involvement of the Wandsworth Battalion in the liberation of Villers-Plouich in 1917, and again, following recapture, in 1918. Writing in the 'Wandsworth Borough News' in 1920, Robert H Harker, a Lieutenant in the Battalion, described the cemetery in the village as "an inseparable link between our great Borough and that village of Villers-Plouich, near the Somme".

For his courage and determination during the hostilities, Corporal Edward Foster, of Tooting, was awarded both the Victoria Cross and the Médaille militaire. A green heritage plaque was unveiled at his former home at Tooting in 2017, and in 2018 a memorial in his name was established at Villers-Plouich.

Following the end of the War the village was adopted by the then Metropolitan Borough of Wandsworth under the British 'League of Help' scheme (one of about 80 British towns to take part in the programme), and funds were donated towards its reconstruction. A deputation from Wandsworth regularly visits to commemorate this connection, most recently in 2018.

== Transport ==
The commune boasted a halt on the railway line from Saint-Just-en-Chaussée to Douai, but this section of the line was closed in the 1970s. The nearest train station is now at Cambrai, about 15 km to the North-East. The village is served by the Line 14 TUC ('Transports urbains du Cambrésis') public bus that runs between Cambrai and Villers-Guislain.

== Heraldry ==
Arms of Villers-Plouich	The arms of Villers-Plouich are blazoned : Ermine a chief sable

== See also ==
- Communes of the Nord department
