= Suzanne, Somme =

Suzanne
- Commune
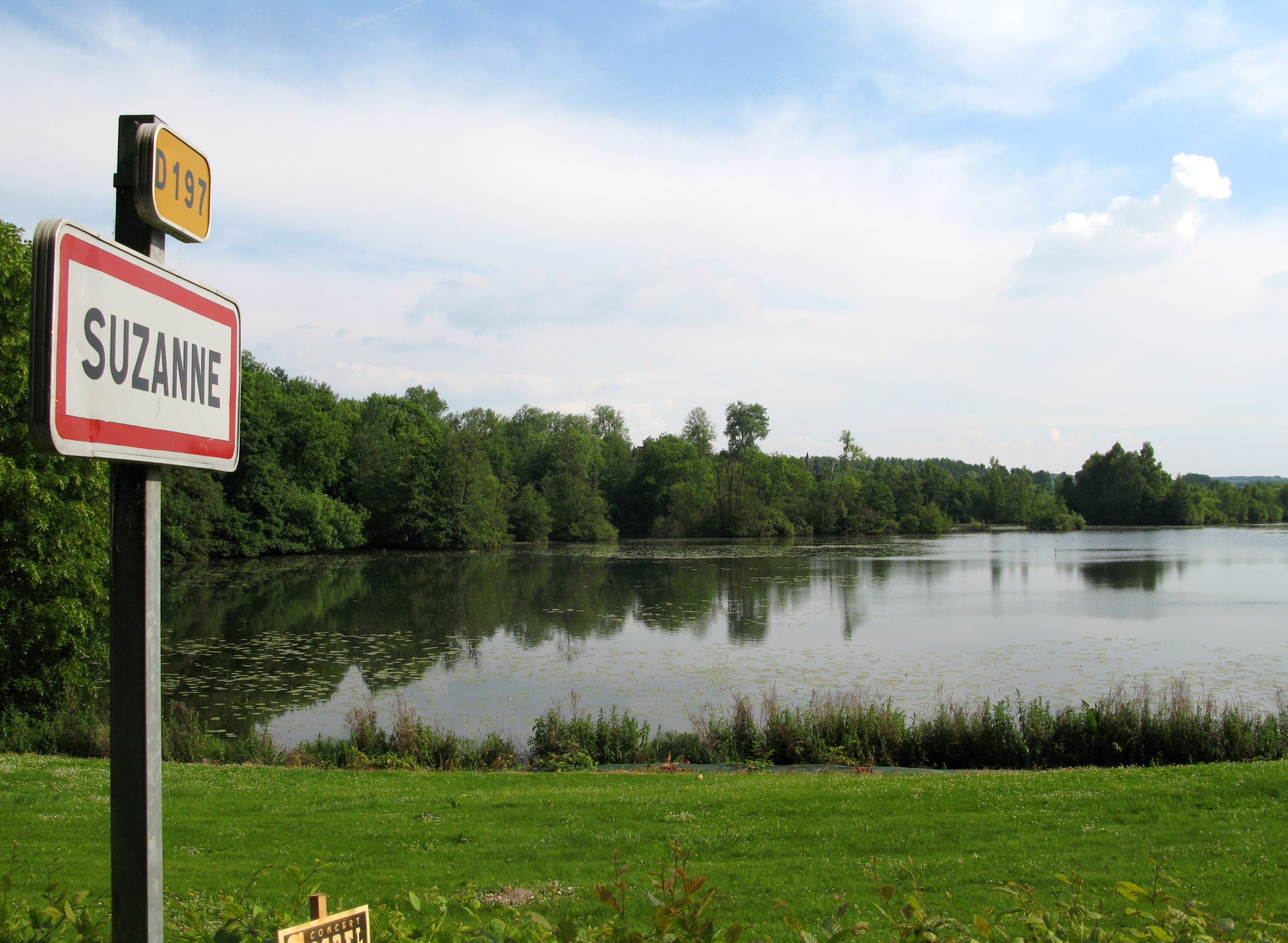
- The lake and entrance sign to Suzanne
- Location of Suzanne
- Location within France Location within Hauts-de-France
- Coordinates: 49°57′03″N 2°46′06″E
- Country: France
- Region: Hauts-de-France
- Department: Somme
- Arrondissement: Péronne
- Canton: Albert
- Intercommunality: CC Pays du Coquelicot

Government
  - Mayor (2020–2026): Michel Caillet
- Area^{1}: 8.66 km^{2} (3.34 sq mi)
- Elevation: 20 m (66 ft)
- Highest elevation: 123 m (404 ft)
- Lowest elevation: 37 m (121 ft)
- Population (2023): 190
  - Density: 22/km^{2} (57/sq mi)
- Time zone: UTC+01:00 (CET)
  - Summer (DST): UTC+02:00 (CEST)
- INSEE/Postal code: 80743 /80340
- ^{1} French Land Register data, which excludes lakes, ponds, glaciers > 1 km^{2} (0.386 sq mi or 247 acres) and river estuaries.

Suzanne (French pronunciation: [syzan]; Picard: Suzène) is a commune in the Somme department in Hauts-de-France in northern France.

== Geography ==
Suzanne is situated 19 miles (31 km) east of Amiens, on the D197 road

== Population ==
Historical population
Year	Pop.	±% p.a.
1968	168	—
1975	147	−1.89%
1982	143	−0.39%
1990	159	+1.33%
1999	151	−0.57%
2007	190	+2.91%
2012	175	−1.63%
2017	186	+1.23%
2023	190	+0.36%
Source: INSEE

== Places of interest ==
- The château of Suzanne
- The church

== See also ==
- Communes of the Somme department
