= Curlu =

- Commune
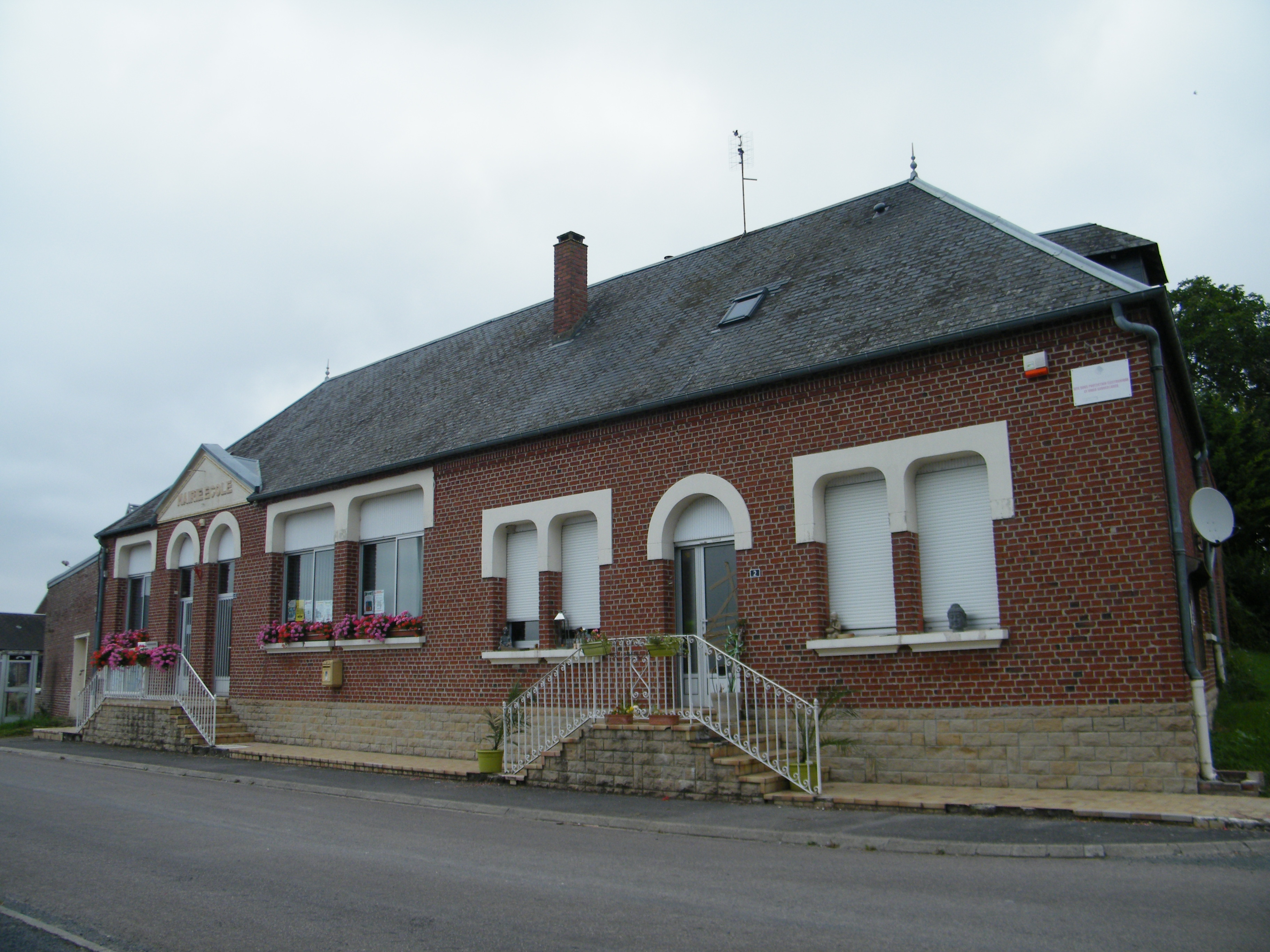
- The town hall and school in Curlu
- Location of Curlu
- Location within France Location within Hauts-de-France
- Coordinates: 49°57′52″N 2°49′02″E
- Country: France
- Region: Hauts-de-France
- Department: Somme
- Arrondissement: Péronne
- Canton: Albert
- Intercommunality: Pays du Coquelicot

Government
  - Mayor (2020–2026): Patrick Senez
- Area^{1}: 5.89 km^{2} (2.27 sq mi)
- Elevation: 55 m (180 ft)
- Highest elevation: 122 m (400 ft)
- Lowest elevation: 42 m (138 ft)
- Population (2023): 152
  - Density: 25.8/km^{2} (66.8/sq mi)
- Time zone: UTC+01:00 (CET)
  - Summer (DST): UTC+02:00 (CEST)
- INSEE/Postal code: 80231 /80360
- ^{1} French Land Register data, which excludes lakes, ponds, glaciers > 1 km^{2} (0.386 sq mi or 247 acres) and river estuaries.

Curlu (French pronunciation: [kyʁly]) is a commune in the Somme department in Hauts-de-France in northern France. Curlu is situated on the D146 road, on the banks of the river Somme, some 30 miles (48 km) east of Amiens.

== Population ==
Historical population
Year	Pop.	±% p.a.
1968	104	—
1975	112	+1.06%
1982	118	+0.75%
1990	117	−0.11%
1999	111	−0.58%
2007	137	+2.67%
2012	138	+0.15%
2017	168	+4.01%
2023	152	−1.65%
Source: INSEE

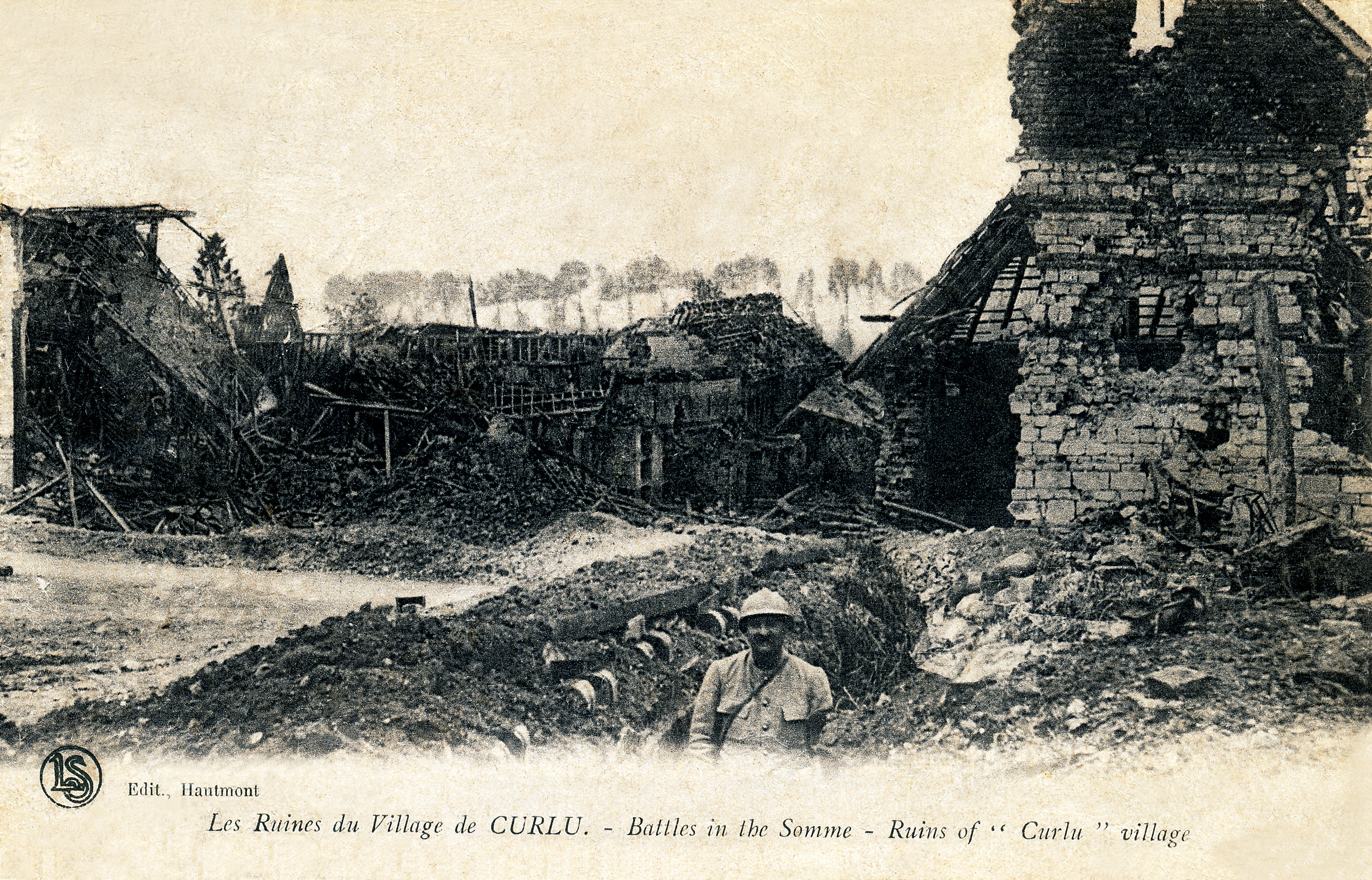
The ruins of the village of Curlu during the Battle of the Somme (France).

== See also ==
- Communes of the Somme department
