= List of battalions of the King's Own Royal Regiment (Lancaster) =

This is a list of battalions of the King's Own Royal Regiment (Lancaster), which existed as an infantry regiment of the British Army from 1881 to 1959.

== Original composition ==
When the 4th (King's Own) Regiment of Foot became the King's Own (Royal Lancaster Regiment) in 1881 under the Cardwell-Childers reforms of the British Armed Forces, three pre-existent militia and volunteer battalions of Lancaster were integrated into the structure of the regiment. Volunteer battalions had been created in reaction to a perceived threat of invasion by France in the late 1850s. Organised as "rifle volunteer corps", they were independent of the British Army and composed primarily of the middle class. The only change to the regiment's structure during the period of 1881-1908 occurred in 1900, when the 2nd Volunteer Battalion was raised, and when the 4th (Militia) Battalion disbanded in 1908.

Battalion	Formed	Formerly
Regular
1st	1680	1st Battalion, 4th (King's Own) Regiment of Foot
2nd	1857	2nd Battalion, 4th (King's Own) Regiment of Foot
Militia
3rd (Militia)	1760	1st Battalion, 1st Royal Lancashire Militia (The Duke of Lancaster's Own)
4th (Militia)	1877	2nd Battalion, 1st Royal Lancashire Militia (The Duke of Lancaster's Own)
Volunteers
1st Volunteer	1859	10th Lancashire Rifle Volunteer Corps

== Reorganisation ==
The Territorial Force (later Territorial Army) was formed in 1908, which the volunteer battalions joined, while the militia battalions transferred to the "Special Reserve". Both of the volunteer battalions were renumbered to create a single sequential order.

Battalion	Formerly
4th	1st Volunteer Battalion
5th	2nd Volunteer Battalion

== First World War ==
The regiment fielded 17 battalions and lost 6,515 officers and other ranks during the course of the war. The regiment's territorial components formed duplicate second and third line battalions. As an example, the three-line battalions of the 4th Battalion were numbered as the 1/4th, 2/4th, and 3/4th respectively. A number of the battalions were formed as part of Secretary of State for War Lord Kitchener's appeal for an initial 100,000 men volunteers in 1914. They were referred to as the New Army or Kitchener's Army. The 11th, New Army "Service" battalion, was referred to as Bantam battalion because it was predominantly composed of men under the prewar height limit. The Volunteer Training Corps were raised with overage or reserved occupation men early in the war, and were initially self-organised into many small corps, with a wide variety of names. Recognition of the corps by the authorities brought regulation and as the war continued the small corps were formed into battalion sized units of the county Volunteer Regiment. In 1918 these were linked to county regiments.

Battalion	Formed	Served	Fate
Regular
1st	1680	Western Front	
2nd	1857	Salonika	
Special Reserve
3rd (Reserve)	1760	Britain, Ireland	
Territorial Force
1/4th	1859	Western Front	See Inter-War
1/5th	1900	Western Front	
2/4th 4th (Reserve) Battalion, from September 1916	Blackpool, February 1915	Britain, Ireland	Disbanded, in ?
2/5th	Lancaster, September 1914	Western Front	Disbanded, in 1919
3/4th	June 1915		Absorbed by 2/4th Battalion upon creation
3/5th 5th (Reserve) Battalion, from April 1916	June 1915		Absorbed by 4th (Reserve) Battalion, in September 1916
12th	January 1917, from 41st Provisional Battalion (Territorial Force)	Britain	Disbanded, in March 1918
New Army
6th (Service)	Lancaster, August 1914	Gallipoli, Mesopotamia	Disbanded, in 1919
7th (Service)	Lancaster, September 1914	Western Front	Disbanded, in February 1918
8th (Service)	Lancaster, October 1914	Western Front	Disbanded, in 1919
9th (Service)	Lancaster, October 1914	Western Front, Salonika	Disbanded, in 1919
10th (Reserve)	Saltash, October 1914	Britain	Became the 43rd Training Reserve Battalion, 10th Reserve Brigade, in September 1916
11th (Service)	Lancaster, August 1915	Western Front	Bantam battalion; disbanded, in February 1918
12th (Reserve)	Lancaster, January 1916	Britain	Became the 76th Training Reserve Battalion, 17th Reserve Brigade, in September 1916
Volunteer Training Corps
13th Battalion Lancashire Volunteer Regiment later the 1st Volunteer Battalion, King's Own (Royal Lancashire) Regiment		Preston, Lancaster	Disbanded post war
14th Battalion Lancashire Volunteer Regiment later the 2nd Volunteer Battalion, King's Own (Royal Lancashire) Regiment		Barrow-in-Furness	Disbanded post war

== Inter-War ==
By 1922, all of the regiment's war-raised battalions had disbanded. The Special Reserve reverted to its militia designation in 1921, then to the Supplementary Reserve in 1924; however, its battalions were effectively placed in 'suspended animation'. As World War II approached, the Territorial Army was reorganised in the mid-1930s, many of its infantry battalions were converted to other roles, especially anti-aircraft.

Battalion	Fate
4th	Converted to 56th (King's Own) Anti-Tank Regiment, Royal Artillery

== Second World War ==
The regiment’s expansion during the Second World War was modest compared to 1914–1918. Existing battalions formed duplicates as in the First World War, while National Defence Companies were combined to create a new "Home Defence" battalion. In addition to this, 5 battalions of the Home Guard were affiliated to the regiment. These wore the 'EL' designation, the remaining 18 wearing this patch were cap-badged to other regiments. A number of Light Anti-Aircraft (LAA) troops were formed from the local battalions to defend specific points, such as factories. Due to the daytime (or shift working) occupations of the men in the LAA troops, the troops required eight times the manpower of an equivalent regular unit.

Battalion	Formed	Served	Fate
Regular
1st	1680	India, Iraq, North Africa, Cyprus	See Post-World War II
2nd	1857	North Africa, Syria, Chindit Campaign	See Post-World War II
Supplementary Reserve
3rd		Britain	See Post-World War II
Territorial Army
5th	1900	Western Front, Britain	Converted to 107th Regiment (King's Own), Royal Armoured Corps
6th	February 1940	Dunkirk, Britain	Disbanded, in July 1944
7th	February 1940	Dunkirk, Britain, Gibraltar, India	Disbanded, in 1947
8th	February 1940	Dunkirk, Britain, Malta, Palestine	Merge with the 1st Battalion, in January 1944
9th	February 1940	Dunkirk, Britain	Converted to 90th Anti-Tank Regiment, Royal Artillery, in November 1941
10th	September 1940	Britain	Converted to 151st Regiment, Royal Armoured Corps
Others
50th (Holding)	Lancaster, June 1940	Britain	Became the 10th Battalion, in September 1940

Home Guard
Battalion	Headquarters	Formation Sign (dark blue on khaki)	Battalion	Headquarters	Formation Sign (dark blue on khaki)
1st	Barrow	EL 1	2nd (North Lonsdale)	Ulverston	EL 2
3rd	Lancaster City	EL 3	4th (South Lonsdale)	Morecambe	EL 4
7th	Blackpool	EL 7			
Home Guard Light Anti-Aircraft units
Formation Sign (dark blue on khaki)	Headquarters or Location	AA Formation and Designation	Formation Sign (dark blue on khaki)	Headquarters or Location	AA Formation and Designation
EL 1	Barrow in Furness; Vickers Armstrong Ltd	A Troop LAA	EL 4	Heysham; Imperial Chemical Industries Ltd	A Troop LAA
EL 7	Blackpool; Vickers Armstrong Ltd	A Troop LAA	EL 7	Blackpool; Brooklands Aviation Ltd	B Troop LAA

== Post-World War II ==
In the immediate post-war period, the army was significantly reduced: nearly all infantry regiments had their first and second battalions amalgamated and the Supplementary Reserve disbanded.

Battalion	Fate
1st	Amalgamated with 2nd Battalion on the 1 April 1949, without a change in title
2nd	Amalgamated with 1st Battalion on the 1 April 1949
5th	Reconstituted from the 107th Training Regiment, Royal Armoured Corps, in January 1947

== Amalgamation ==
The 1957 Defence White Paper stated that the King's Own Royal Regiment was due to be amalgamated with the Border Regiment, to form the King's Own Royal Border Regiment on the 1 October 1959.

Battalion	Fate
1st	Amalgamated with 1st Battalion, Border Regiment, to form 1st Battalion, King's Own Royal Border Regiment
5th	Transferred to the King's Own Royal Border Regiment, without a change in title
