= 12th (Service) Battalion, Suffolk Regiment (East Anglian) =

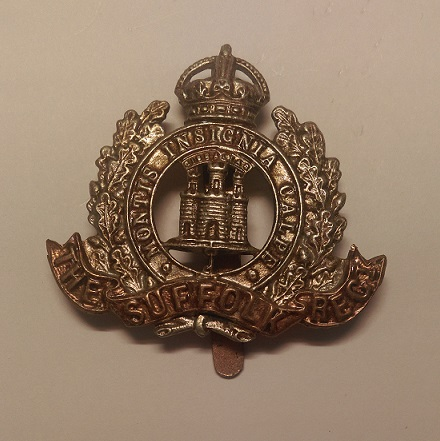
- Cap badge of the Suffolk Regiment
- Active: 21 June 1915–23 June 1919
- Allegiance: United Kingdom
- Branch: New Army
- Type: Bantam battalion
- Role: Infantry
- Size: One Battalion
- Part of: 40th Division; 14th (Light) Division
- Garrison/HQ: Bury St Edmunds
- Engagements: German retreat to the Hindenburg Line; Bourlon Wood; German spring offensive Battle of the Lys; Hundred Days Offensive

The 12th (Service) Battalion, Suffolk Regiment (East Anglian) was a 'Bantam' infantry unit recruited as part of 'Kitchener's Army' in World War I. It was raised in the summer of 1915 and served on the Western Front from June 1916, seeing action against the Hindenburg Line and at Bourlon Wood. It was almost destroyed during the German spring offensive of 1918 and was sent back to England to be reconstituted. The reformed battalion then took part in the final advance to victory in Flanders.

== Background ==
Alfred Leete's recruitment poster for Kitchener's Army.

On 6 August 1914, less than 48 hours after Britain's declaration of war, Parliament sanctioned an increase of 500,000 men for the Regular British Army, and the newly-appointed Secretary of State for War, Earl Kitchener of Khartoum issued his famous call to arms: 'Your King and Country Need You', urging the first 100,000 volunteers to come forward. This group of six divisions with supporting arms became known as Kitchener's First New Army, or 'K1'. The flood of volunteers overwhelmed the ability of the army to absorb and organise them, and by the time the Fifth New Army (K5) was authorised on 10 December 1914, many of the units were being organised as 'Pals battalions' under the auspices of mayors and corporations of towns up and down the country.

However, a large number of otherwise medically fit volunteers were turned away because they did not meet the minimum height requirement of the prewar Regular Army, of 5 feet 3 inches (160 cm). Alfred Bigland, the Member of Parliament for Birkenhead, persuaded Kitchener that this pool of potential manpower should be tapped, and he was given authority to raise a battalion of 'Bantams' (named after the small but pugnacious fighting cock). Three Bantam battalions were quickly raised at Birkenhead for the Cheshire Regiment, many of them coal miners who had travelled long distances to enlist, and the scheme spread to other areas. The War Office (WO) authorised each military district to recruit a battalion, attached to whichever regimental depot had sufficient capacity.

== Recruitment and training ==
The Bantam battalion for No 9 District of Eastern Command, covering East Anglia, was assigned to the Suffolk Regiment and was organised at its depot at Bury St Edmunds Barracks. Enlistment began on 21 June and the battalion was officially formed on 7 July 1915 as 12th (Service) Battalion, Suffolk Regiment (East Anglian). Most of the recruits came from Suffolk, Cambridgeshire, the Isle of Ely and Essex. Honorary Colonel Robert Pigott was appointed as commanding officer (CO) on 29 July as a Temporary Lieutenant-Colonel. He was the Chief Electrical Engineer of the Bombay, Baroda and Central India Railway (BB&CIR) and CO of 1st Battalion BB&CIR Volunteer Rifles; since January 1915 had been serving as a Temporary Major in the 12th (Reserve) Battalion, Essex Regiment. When Pigott arrived the battalion consisted of the adjutant, Temporary Lieutenant Lemuel Lloyd from the 10th (Reserve) Battalion, Suffolk Regiment, two other officers and 62 other ranks (ORs), but recruits came in fast, with a draft of 200 Bantams arriving from the depot of the Middlesex Regiment. Initial training was carried out by retired non-commissioned officers (NCOs) of the Suffolk Regiment. On 25 November the battalion, now 800 strong with 16 officers left for Bordon Camp where it joined other Bantam battalions in 121st Brigade of 40th Division. The depot companies of 12th Bn Suffolks joined 10th (R) Bn at Colchester.

In December the battalion marched to Pirbright Camp. It had been finding that many of the recruits were not mature men of stocky build but under-age boys, and at this time 130 had to be discharged. Others were found to be physically unfit for service, a problem faced by all the later Bantam battalions after the initial volunteer rush of fit miners and other manual workers had waned. 40th Division had been intended to be a second Bantam division (after 35th Division) and while the Welsh Bantam Brigade (119th Bde) was fit for service, it was estimated that the four battalions in each of 120th and 121st Bdes only had enough fit men for two serviceable battalions each. After the 'weeding-out' process, 12th Suffolks was brought up to strength in February 1916 by absorbing 22nd (Service) Battalion, Middlesex Regiment, which was disbanded. (This bantam battalion had been formed at Mill Hill Barracks on 29 June 1915 and had joined 121st Bde in October.) After the reorganisation 121st Bde consisted of two bantam battalions, 12th Suffolks and 13th Green Howards, and two regulation height 'Pals' battalions, 20th (Shoreditch) and 21st (Islington) Bns, Middlesex Regiment. Major Theodore Eardley-Wilmot, a regular officer of the York and Lancaster Regiment who had been wounded at the Second Battle of Ypres in 1915, was appointed second-in-command of 12th Suffolks.

This reorganisation had held up the training process, but once it was completed 40th Division intensified the training, and all the necessary arms and equipment were issued. In mid-May the division was warned to prepare for service with the British Expeditionary Force (BEF) on the Western Front. 12th Suffolks mobilised at Pirbright on 27 May and on 4 June entrained at Brookwood station bound for Southampton Docks. The battalion embarked on 5 June and landed next day at Le Havre.

== Service ==
By 9 June 40th Division had concentrated at Lillers, near Béthune. 12th Suffolks spent its first weeks in France on further training, in 'bombing' (suffering its first casualties in accidents), the attack, anti-gas defence, digging and repairing trenches, and musketry, as well as route marches. On 24 June 40th Division moved to the Calonne sector behind 1st Division, where A and B Companies of 12th Suffolks were attached to 1st Black Watch and then 1st Cameron Highlanders for instruction in Trench warfare. Afterwards C and D Companies were attached to 10th Gloucestershire Regiment. Although Calonne was a quiet sector the attached companies suffered several casualties. 40th Division then took over the front from 1st Division on 3 July, with 12th Suffolks at Maroc, including the famous Double Crassier spoil-heap facing Loos, which was where the battalion bombers were stationed. 12th Suffolks alternated spells of trench duty with the two Middlesex battalions and was billeted at Les Brebis when out of the line. Both armies were concentrating on the Somme Offensive further south, but units in the Loos sector still saw casualties mount up during the summer from occasional shelling, snipers, and trench mortars, or during patrols and raids. No man's land was narrow enough for both sides to use rifle grenades. D Company of 12th Suffolks carried out a raid on 'Cameron' and 'Gordon' craters and the 'White Mound' on the night of 3 August, destroying a German mine shaft and a deep dugout. Lieutenant-Col Pigott was invalided on 12 August and Maj Eardley-Wilmot took over command, later being promoted to Lt-Col.

40th Division was relieved at the end of October and moved south to join Fourth Army in the Somme sector. Three weeks' training was first carried out around Abbeville, with 12th Suffolks billeted at Berneuil, then by road and rail to the area west of Bray-sur-Somme, with 12th Suffolks at Mouflers. The division then went into the line at the end of December, with 121st Bde initially in reserve, 12th Suffolks in 'Camp 17' at Suzanne. On 31 December 12th Suffolks took over the front line at Bouchavesnes. Here there was complete destruction left by that summer's fighting. The front line troops spent the winter among a maze of smashed and flooded trenches, under occasional bombardments. Living in these conditions the number of sick and cases of Trench foot rose sharply. Due to the lack of fit replacements, the Bantam concept was abandoned during the winter of 1916-17 and thereafter reinforcements to the battalion (unless they were returning wounded) were of normal height.

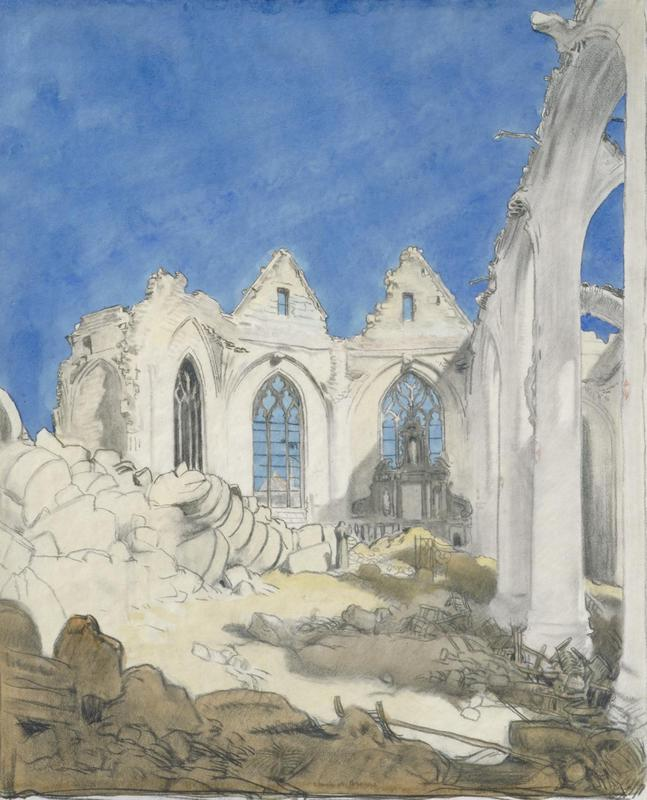
The Church, Péronne, by Sir William Orpen.

=== Hindenburg Line ===
Training for the battalions was stepped up during the winter, with emphasis on Lewis guns and the new 'fighting platoon' tactics. Trench-raiding by both sides resumed when the weather improved. On 28 February 12th Suffolks provided a smoke barrage for an attack by the neighbouring XIV Corps, the Germans retaliating with artillery fire that landed just in front of the battalion and did no damage. 40th Division was ordered to penetrate into the German lines at least once a week. On 17 March 119th Bde raided the enemy line under cover of bad weather, and reported it only lightly held. Two platoons of 12th Suffolk joined 21st Middlesex probing forward and found the trenches in front of 121st Bde empty: the Germans had begun withdrawing from in front of 40th Division that day. This was part of a large-scale retreat to the prepared positions of the Hindenburg Line (Operation Alberich). The division immediately began cautiously following up, with patrols out in front in contact with German rearguards. Lieutenant-Col Eardley-Wilmot and Capt F. Miskin went into Péronne on 18 March and found it deserted. 12th Suffolks. moved into the town, an outpost company continuing with the division's deliberate advance. On 20 March 121st Bde was leapfrogged by another division taking the lead. 40th Division was then set to repairing the roads and railways that had been destroyed by the retreating enemy. Once communications had been restored, XV Corps, to which 40th Division belonged, closed up to the Hindenburg Line during the first three weeks of April. On 12 April 12th Suffolks acted as outposts for 121st Bde moving up to Gouzeaucourt. German resistance stiffened among the fortified villages they held as outworks to their main line.

121st Brigade was resting and refitting at Étricourt when 40th Division began operations against these outworks, taking 'Fifteen Ravine', Villers-Plouich, and Beaucamps between 21 and 25 April. However, the brigade returned for the last of these attacks, a large-scale raid against La Vacquerie by 40th and 8th Divisions. 12th Suffolks went into the line on 1 May, and on 4 May the artillery had fired a practice barrage at dawn but the brigade did not attack. Next day the artillery continued firing to cut the enemy's barbed wire, then at 23.00 it opened a heavy barrage on the enemy's line and 121st and 119th Bdes attacked under its cover. A and D Companies of 12th Suffolk attacked, D Company suffering badly from machine gun fire and uncut wire. A Company reached its objective, but found that this was only a set of dummy trenches. A party of this company became separated in the dark and continued towards the main Hindenburg Line. After fighting and capturing a German patrol they retired down a sunken lane towards La Vacquerie where they captured a German sentry and made him show them the way back. The raiders were recalled at 01.00 and next day 12th Suffolks went back to Desart Wood. Over the following weeks the battalion alternated between rest billets in Heudicourt or Sorel and the front or support lines at Villers-Guislain or in the Gonnelieu Salient. The division continued offensive patrols and raiding during the summer, 12th Suffolks carrying out one raid on the night of 21/22 May and another larger one on 25 September, driving off an enemy raid on 11/12 July. When not in the front line the battalions spent much of their time digging and improving trenches and roads.

=== Bourlon Wood ===
After six months' continuous service in the line, 40th Division was relieved at the beginning of October and went to the Fosseux area for rest. It then moved to the wooded area round Lucheux to begin training for the forthcoming Battle of Cambrai, with particular emphasis on fighting in woods, ready for action in Bourlon Wood under IV Corps. The battle began with a massed tank attack on 20 November that broke through the Hindenburg Line, and the division moved up on 22 November in order to attack Bourlon Wood next morning. The capture of the wood by 40th and 51st (Highland) Divisions would provide a defensive flank to allow Third Army to continue developing the successes of the first two days. 40th Division moved up during the night to take over the front, and the men were tired by the difficult approach march. 121st Brigade was on the left, with 12th Suffolks in brigade reserve. The assault was launched at 10.30 preceded by a Creeping barrage and tanks, 13th Green Howards and 20th Middlesex leading for 121st Bde. During the morning 12th Suffolks moved up to take over 20th Middlesex's jumping off trench. 20th Middlesex had reached Bourlon village but could not fight their way into it, while 21st Middlesex had been held up by a German strongpoint and had suffered heavy casualties. At noon B and C Companies of 12th Suffolks went up to reinforce 20th and 21st Middlesex respectively, with B Company in support on the Cambrai road. That night 21st Middlesex was relieved in the front line by a composite dismounted battalion (19th Hussars and 1/1st Bedfordshire Yeomanry) from 9th Cavalry Brigade, with 12th Suffolks ready to support them in case of a counter-attack. The following morning 12th Suffolks was ordered to renew the attack on Bourlon village at noon, later changed to 15.00. B Company on the right penetrated into the village behind some tanks of I Battalion, Tank Corps, but D Company was held up by machine gun fire; they were reinforced by C and A Companies respectively. At 17.00 news arrived that the battalion to the right was not attacking but was digging in in the wood, and 12th Suffolks' companies were withdrawn from their exposed positions. It turned out that IV Corps had postponed the attack, but the order had not reached 121st Bde in time. That evening 12th Suffolks held the brigade's left front with two companies, one in support and the fourth in reserve in the 'Sunken Road'. By the morning of 25 November 121st Bde had these two companies facing Bourlon from the south, their line extended by a company of 20th Middlesex and supported by the cavalry, and by 11th King's Own and 13th East Surrey Regiment of 120th Bde, while on the north side of Bourlon was 14th Highland Light Infantry of 120th Bde. Despite bitter fighting during the day in efforts to clear Bourlon and get through to the isolated 14th HLI, 12th Suffolk was not involved, other than receiving some heavy shelling, and later that day the battalion was relieved. It withdrew to captured trenches in the Hindenburg Support Line. The whole of 40th Division was withdrawn at noon on 27 November and that night 12th Suffolks marched back to Ytres and entrained for billets in Bailleulmont. Its casualties in the operation had been relatively light: 6 officers wounded, one missing, 38 ORs killed or missing and 97 wounded. The second-in-command, Maj Lemuel Lloyd, received an 'immediate' Distinguished Service Order (DSO) for his work, while Lt-Col Eardley-Wilmot received a 'periodic' DSO in the 1917 New Year Honours.

=== Winter 1917–18 ===
40th Division then took over the line north-west of Bullecourt in the Arras sector. It occupied a captured section of the Hindenburg Line named 'Tunnel Trench' and held those positions through the winter, despite its very weak battalions. Trench raiding resumed, 12th Suffolks being the victim of one on 5 January 1918, when about 250 Germans supported by a heavy bombardment, an aircraft and flamethrowers attacked the right front of the battalion at 06.30 and took about 200 yards (180 m) of the line and a saphead, annihilating an outpost. By contrast the attack against the left company were driven off by rifle fire before the attackers had cleared their own wire. The second-in-command, Maj Lemuel Lloyd, in temporary command of 12th Suffolks, organised several counter-attacks with artillery and trench mortar support, which finally recovered the lost ground at 18.15 that evening. Next afternoon the Germans again captured the saphead on the right, 12th Suffolks counter-attacking at 16.30 after arranging artillery support, but could not dislodge them until a party of 21st Middlesex and heavy guns were brought in. The Germans took the saphead yet again on 8 January but were finally driven out by 12th Suffolks and a company of 21st Middlesex, the battalion taking 19 prisoners. After that, raiding had to be halted when a thaw made the trenches impassable: they could only be reached 'over the top' at night. On 12 February 121st Bde went back to Hamelincourt for a month's rest, with 12th Suffolks accommodated at 'Clonmel Camp', then in billets at Bailleulmont from 28 February.

By the beginning of 1918 the BEF was suffering a manpower crisis. It was forced to reduce infantry brigades from four to three battalions, the surplus units being disbanded and drafted to others as reinforcements. 119th Brigade was the weakest in the division and had two battalions disbanded, 21st Middlesex being transferred to it from 121st Bde which was otherwise unaffected. 12th Suffolk received 12 officers and 308 ORs as reinforcements from 9th Bn Suffolk Regiment, which was being disbanded from 6th Division.

=== German Spring Offensive ===
When the German Spring Offensive (Operation Michael) was launched on 21 March 1918, 40th Division was in GHQ Reserve, with 12th Suffolks in camp at Blairville, south-west of Arras, where it had been undergoing training since 12 March. It was ordered with the rest of 121st Bde to Hamelincourt, arriving at 14.00. 12th Suffolks was the first unit to reach the hard-pressed 103rd Bde of 34th Division. 103rd Brigade directed the battalion to occupy the rear defences of the Battle Zone near Mory. 12th Suffolks marched cross-country to the Mort Homme road, establishing battalion HQ there by 19.00. At first the battalion could not get in touch with 13th Green Howards to the left because the Germans were already holding the stretch of trench between them, but the Green Howards counter-attacked and cleared them out. The battalions suffered numerous casualties but inflicted heavy losses on the oncoming enemy, taking several prisoners. During the night the enemy regained a foothold between the Suffolks and the Green Howards, so the following morning Lt-Col Eardley-Wilmot took out a platoon to try to find a forward position from which to cover this gap to the left. German snipers made good use of a heavy ground mist and were able to pick off the CO and the artillery liaison officer, killing them both. The adjutant, Capt A.M. Cross, took temporary command of the battalion, which continued to suffer from machine gun fire and misdirected friendly artillery. The Germans attacked over to the left of the battalion at about 14.00, and at 16.00 began massing in front of 12th Suffolks, who poured rifle and Lewis gun fire into them with good results. By 17.00 the battalion was under heavy fire, the left was weakening, and units to the right were under attack: soon they could be seen retreating. At 18.00 the Mort Homme road came under artillery fire and 12th Suffolks were attacked in force. The battalion sent up the SOS rockets and the British artillery put down a counter-barrage on the attackers. But by now both flanks were 'in the air' and although Capt Cross ordered the three companies holding the front line to fall back to the 'Army Line' or 'Green Line' behind, none of them got away, all being killed or captured. At 21.00 Battalion HQ and C Company were in Mory Copse in the Army Line when the second-in-command, Maj Lloyd, arrived from the transport lines to take over command. He had seen Germans on the road, so he formed a block using a group of 14th Argyll and Sutherland Highlanders (120th Bde) who had turned up. With two companies from 20th Middlesex from brigade reserve, Lloyd occupied a position from the Army Line in front of Mory Copse back to the sunken road behind it; the rest of the Army Line on either flank was in enemy hands. During the night the enemy worked round both sides of the copse and up the sunken road, so Lloyd ordered his group to fall back further to a trench at right angles to Sunken Road, with troops facing towards both flanks. The quartermasters got through to the position with rations and ammunition, but were soon surrounded; the limbers broke through at a canter and got away. All touch had been lost with neighbouring troops, so when the enemy fire died down Lloyd took advantage of the darkness and marched his men back cross-country towards Ervillers and Mory. Finally the group made contact with 2/4th Leicestershire Regiment of 59th (2nd North Midland) Division to the right and before dawn on 24 March they dug in along the Ervillers–Mory road on some rising ground. All that day the position was shelled, machine-gunned, and bombed by enemy aircraft. That night the Germans attacked all along the line and the troops to the left were driven back through Lloyd's group, which faced left. Although rifle and Lewis gun fire held off the attack for some time it was too strong, so the group had to fall back to the Ervillers–Béhagnies road. Here Regimental Sergeant-Major Dunn had collected stragglers and detachments from a variety of units (Note: 12th Suffolks' war diary records the following units in the mixed group holding the Ervillers–Béhagnies road on 25 March: 12th Suffolks, 20th and 21st Middlesex, 13th East Surreys (all 40th Division); 2/4th Leicesters (59th (2nd NM) Division); 10th and 11th East Yorkshire Regiment (31st Division).) and organised a line in front of the Ervillers–Béhagnies road, which held up the enemy advance for about 12 hours. The Germans spent the morning of 25 March establishing machine guns and snipers in front of the position and gathering troops, The attack came in at 15.00 on a wide front, but did not actually reach the trench occupied by Lloyd's mixed group. Once again, troops to the left gave way, but at 20.00 Lloyd's group was finally ordered to evacuate its line and fall back through 42nd (East Lancashire) Division, which was relieving 40th Division. On 26 March the remnant of 12th Suffolks was sent to Sus-Saint-Léger. Its total casualties amounted to 367: of 22 regimental officers and the medical officer (MO) who went into action on 21 March, only one officer and the MO were left. Major Lloyd was promoted to command the battalion.

=== Battle of the Lys ===
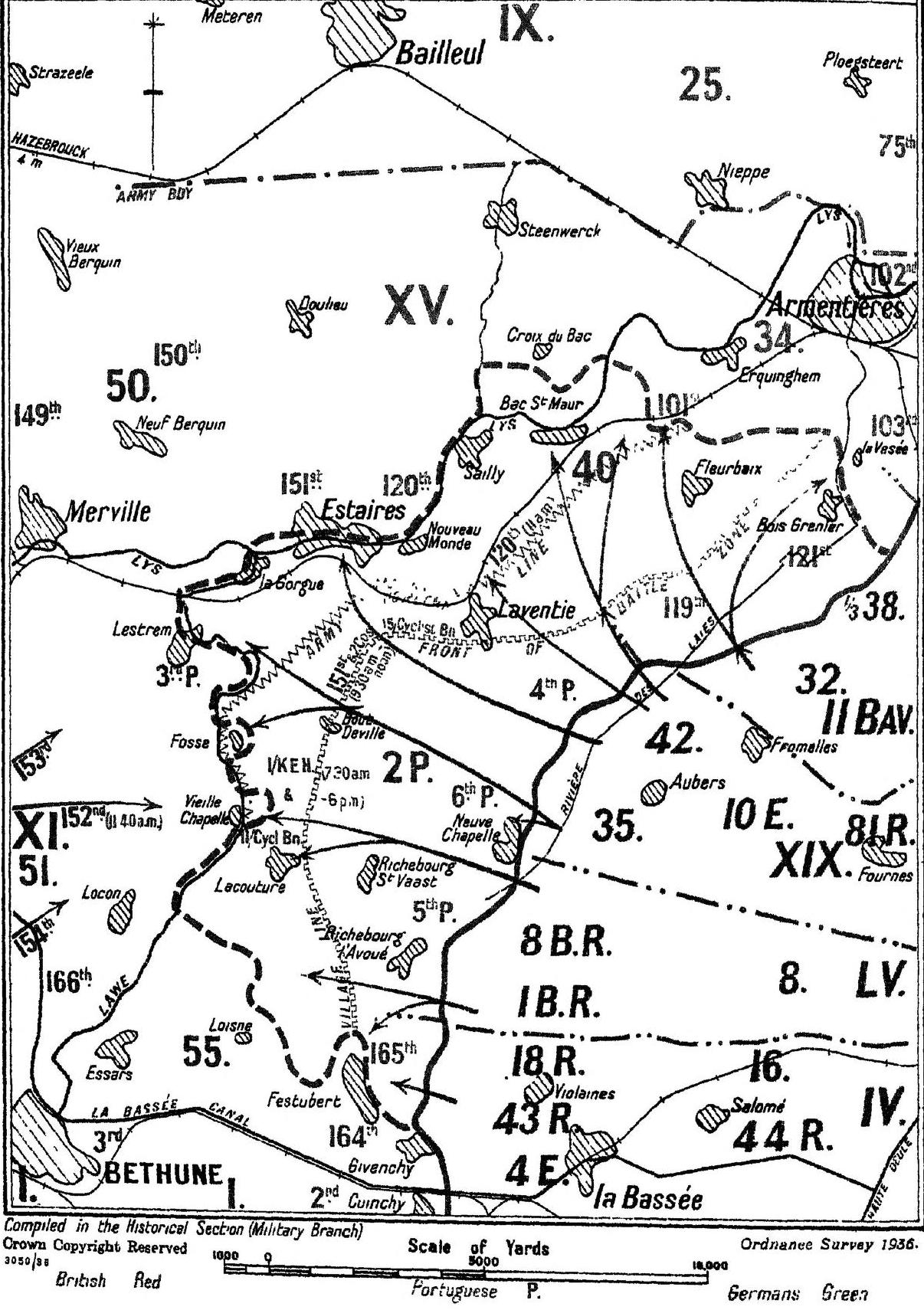
The German breakthrough to the Lys, 9 April 1918.

After the first phase of the German spring offensive, 40th Division was sent north by bus and lorry to Merville to join First Army to rest and refit in a quiet sector. 12th Suffolks was taken by buses to Neuf-Berquin. At first the battalion went into the line in the Bois-Grenier sector, then went back into support, billeted at Fleurbaix. It was there at 04.15 on 9 April when the Germans launched the second main phase of their offensive (Operation Georgette, the Battle of the Lys) with a massive bombardment. While trench mortars bombed the forward trenches, heavier guns shelled strongpoints, HQs, villages and crossroads with high explosive and gas shells. Much of this was directed at 40th Division's neighbours, the inexperienced Portuguese Expeditionary Corps. 12th Suffolks 'stood to' at 07.00 and manned the reserve trenches. As the Germans penetrated the Portuguese positions they began to 'roll up' 119th Bde's line in front of Fleurbaix: by about 09.00 13th ESR was surrounded and overrun, though some of its strongpoints held out until the afternoon. At 10.00 12th Suffolk was ordered to move C Company into more forward positions while A Company was brought up from reserve. The battalion sent a patrol into the dense morning fog to find out the situation in front, which engaged a German party. At 10.30 a party of 50 Battalion HQ personnel was sent forward to thicken up the defences, the remainder pulling back from Fleurbaix to Port a Clous. The patrol reported large numbers of German cyclists moving across the battalion's front. By 11.00 the enemy were established in the British 'Subsidiary Line' in front of the Fleurbaix defences, and began heavy machine gun fire against 12th Suffolks, The battalion had Lewis guns positioned in concrete emplacements and in shellholes, but a number of these were picked off. Nevertheless as the fog cleared the battalion inflicted heavy casualties on the Germans moving across their front towards the breach in the Portuguese line. The British Commander-in-Chief, Sir Douglas Haig, later made special mention of 12th Suffolk's 'gallant service' at Fleurbaix in his Despatches. By 16.30 both the battalion's flanks were 'in the air', and B and C Companies had suffered severe casualties, so it fought a rearguard action, and under covering fire from the Lewis guns it went back to fill a gap in the line between 16th Royal Scots (right) and 11th Suffolks (Cambridgeshire) (left), both of 101st Bde, 34th Division. Battalion HQ, however, was cut off from the companies and was under machine gun fire, so it fell back to Fort Rompu on the River Lys near Erquinghem, where Lt-Col Lloyd picked up about 60 stragglers. HQ held off three attacks on Fort Rompu with its fire from the adjacent orchard and then got in touch with 16th Royal Scots and joined its line. 101st Bde and 12th Suffolks held this south-facing line all night.

Next day (10 April) 101st Bde was heavily attacked from both Fleurbaix and Fort Rompu but was told to hold on at all costs while 34th Division evacuated Armentières, but that reinforcements were on the way. The remnants of the 15th and 16th Royal Scots together with 12th Suffolks resisted stoutly but were gradually forced back towards the Lys with heavy casualties. A detachment of 3rd Australian Tunnelling Company and F Special (Gas) Company, Royal Engineers (RE), joined the line to help. Finally at 16.00 the group was ordered to cross the Lys at Erquinghem and form up in the 'Erquinghem Switch' trench on the far bank. Here they got in touch with 102nd Bde to their left, but the Germans were already across the river and working their way towards 101st Bde's open right flank. At 02.00 next morning 12th Suffolks were ordered to make their way back to Nieppe and hold the railway there under the orders of 102nd Bde. The battalion joined the remnants of 13th Green Howards and the HQ of 20th Middlesex and formed a composite 121st Bde battalion under the CO of 20th Middlesex. At 14.00 word came that the enemy were in La Rue du Sac and 12th Suffolks were ordered to counter-attack to restore the situation. The battalion formed up with C Company and two Lewis guns in the first wave, A and B with two more Lewis guns in the second, and a few of D Company and some Australian tunnellers in reserve. The attacking lines threw the enemy out of Papot, but as they retired the Germans left machine guns and snipers in La Rue du Sac itself. The second wave came up and formed a line, posting the Lewis guns. The battalion had lost another 70 of its remaining men but the situation was stabilised and it was ordered not to press the attack further. At 20.30 12th Suffolks were ordered to fall back, the front line withdrawing through the support line and then covering the support line as they fell back in turn, until the battalion reached a line held by troops of the 29th Division. It went into reserve at La Creche, then the following morning (12 April) marched to Strazeele where it dug in as reserve to the reunited 40th Division. The British had now stabilised the line in front of Strazeele, and on the evening of 13 April 12th Suffolks marched to the Hondeghem Road to join up with their transport. and then bivouacked for the night at Bavinchove. On 14 April it marched to billets in Saint-Omer, remaining in this area for the rest of the month. The battalion's casualties in April amounted to 5 officers and 412 ORs. Lieutenant-Col Lloyd received a Bar to his DSO for his work at Fleurbaix.

=== Reconstitution ===
After suffering crippling losses in these actions, 40th Division was withdrawn from the line and temporarily formed composite units. On 18 April two companies of 13th East Surreys were attached to 12th Suffolks to form 'C' Battalion of '40th Division Composite Brigade'. 40th Division was reinforced – 12th Suffolks received over 600 men – but these were barely trained. Because of the Army's shortage of trained reinforcements, GHQ decided that several divisions would not be brought up to strength but instead would be reduced to 'Training cadres' (TCs) as instructors to the US Army divisions now arriving. 40th Division was among those selected, and its infantry battalions were each reduced to TCs of roughly 10 officers and 45 ORs: their surplus personnel were drafted as reinforcements to other units.

On 6 May 21 officers and 670 ORs of 12th Suffolks went to the Base Depot for drafting, while the 11 officers and 51 ORs retained for the TC were camped at Klinderbelke near St-Omer, and from 18 May at Sercus reconnoitring new defence lines. However, while some of 40th Division's TCs were used to train American troops, others including 12th Suffolks were sent back to the UK to be reconstituted. The cadre of 12th Suffolks went by train to Boulogne on 16 June to join 14th (Light) Division, which crossed to Folkestone next day. The battalion then went by another train to Brookwood and marched to Stonycastle at Pirbright, where it went into Bullswater Camp. Here on 19 June it was joined by 674 men in drafts from various battalions, but mainly from 16th (Service) Battalion, Suffolk Regiment, which had been formed at Stonycastle on 1 June and was now absorbed into 12th Bn. The men were all of B2 medical category. The reconstituted 12th Suffolks, together with 20th Middlesex and 10th HLI, also from 40th Division, now formed 43rd Bde.

After a short training period 14th (L) Division returned to the Western Front, 12th Suffolks landing at Boulogne on 5 July 1918. The division assembled round Wierre-Effroy outside Boulogne and resumed training. 12th Suffolks carried out its training at Bayenghem-lès-Éperlecques. By mid-August, with the Allied Hundred Days Offensive under way, the division was deemed sufficiently fit and trained to be able to hold the line in a quiet sector under Second Army. 12th Suffolks carried out a series of marches to the Ypres Salient where on 19 August it took over support positions. On 23 August it relieved 20th Middlesex and did a tour of duty in the front line, after which it alternated between the front and support lines and rest at Orilla Camp. With additional reinforcements its strength had risen to 42 officers and 905 ORs by the end of the month. From 14 to 20 September it underwent further training at 'School Camp' at Sint-Jan-Ter-Biezen near Poperinge and then went into reserve at St Laurent near Steenvoorde before returning to the line at the 'Bluff' beside the Ypres–Comines Canal near Voormezeele.

=== The Bluff ===
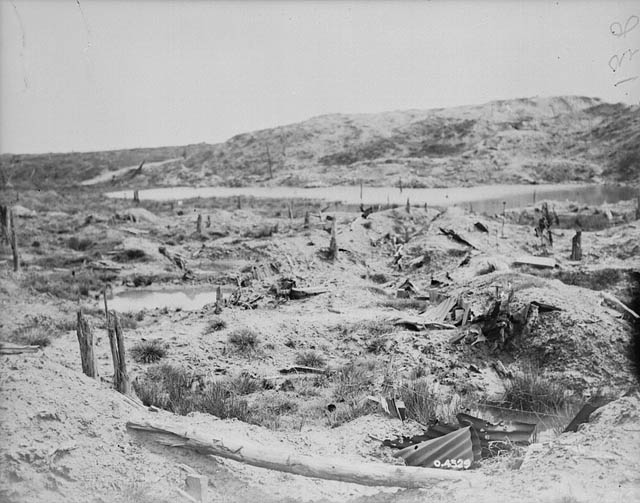
The Bluff, photographed just after the war.

The Allies launched a coordinated series of offensives on 26–29 September. Second Army's attack (the Fifth Battle of Ypres) began on 28 September. The attack was a surprise, with no preliminary bombardment, but the assaulting troops were preceded by a dense creeping barrage. Despite the acknowledged weakness of 14th (L) Division, it had been given one of the toughest objectives: 'The Bluff'. This spoil heap from the construction of the canal had been fought over and undermined since early 1915: in the words of the Official History it 'bristled with machine guns and was expected to prove troublesome'. (Note: It is possible that the Bluff was assigned to 14th (L) Division because the original division had defended it with distinction early in 1916; the division's memorial has been repositioned nearby.) 43rd Brigade attacked along the canal, with 12th Suffolks on the north bank, 20th Middlesex on the south, and 10th HLI in reserve. The Suffolks attacked with two companies in front formed up along 'Middlesex Road' and two 400 yards (370 m) behind in support, each company in two waves formed of lines of 'worms' (sections in single file). From Middlesex Road the ground rose gently but was deeply pitted with shellholes, overgrown with woods and broken wire, making for bad going. The elongated 'Spoil Bank' along the canal bank was also covered with shellholes, leading to a dip and then the steep 50–70 feet (15–21 m) face of the Bluff. Although the men were of low medical category they were keen and confident and moved across the ground smartly, keeping close to the barrage. A Company took on the Bluff frontally, one platoon moving along the top of the Spoil Bank (with a patrol on the canal bank) the other below, while B Company swept round the flank of the Bluff. Although the defenders at first showed signs of resistance, they lost heart when they saw the flanking movement and gave way. The battalion took 150–200 prisoners, a field gun and numerous machine guns, trench mortars and anti-tank rifles, and a complete dressing station, at the cost of 122 casualties. A detachment of 184th Tunnelling Company, RE, checked the 14 known tunnels and dugouts under the Bluff, disarming at least four that were charged with explosives. After 12th Suffolks had secured the Bluff, 20th Middlesex on the other side of the canal could pass it and go on to their objective of 'White Chateau' without much opposition. 43rd Brigade having completed its task, other formations continued the battle. Lieutenant-Col Lloyd received a rare second Bar to his DSO for his work.

=== Courtrai and the Scheldt ===
12th Suffolks went back to camps near Ypres, then on 3 October began work on repairing the Menin Road, which was vital to support Second Army's advance. On 12 October it went up by train to Wulverghem where 14th (L) Division was brought up for the Battle of Courtrai, beginning on 14 October. 12th Suffolks marched up into the line at Wervik on the River Lys on 15 October, while other parts of the division crossed the river. 12th Suffolks followed them across on 16 October, as 43rd Bde probed forwards and occupied the high ground and valley in front of Paul Bucq. Over the next three days it continued advancing without much opposition, being in reserve when the rest of 43rd Bde overcame a rearguard on 18 October. On 20 October the battalion attacked and occupied a line from the Espierre Canal to Dottignies as its first objective, and then crossed the canal, driving the enemy back across the River Scheldt and occupying a line along the marshy riverbank. The Germans then shelled, machine-gunned, mortared and sniped their positions from the opposite (east) bank, while firing gas shells into the rear areas. Next day the 12th Suffolks were relieved and became the support battalion in billets at Evregnies until the end of the month, while Second Army closed up to the Scheldt.

12th Suffolks returned to the front line along the west bank of the Scheldt on 8 November. Second Army was preparing an assault crossing of the river on 11 November but enemy artillery fire died away completely and it seemed that they had pulled out. 14th (L) Division reconnoitred routes through the swamps along the riverbank and that night a platoon of B Company, 12th Suffolks, crossed the river at some sluice gates near Hérinnes and organised a bridgehead. The following morning the whole battalion crossed at Marcoing and advanced to a line 1,000 yards (910 m) from Molenbaix, north of Tournai. Next day 14th (L) Division was squeezed out of the line by two other divisions crossing its front, so the battalion went into billets in farms around Molenbaix. It was still there on 11 November when the Armistice with Germany came into effect at 11.00.

=== Post-Armistice ===
For the first few days after the ending of hostilities 12th Suffolks remained at Molenbaix and Evregnies, but on 15 November the battalion marched to billets at Tourcoing where it remained until the new year. The division was put to work repairing roads and in training, with educational classes for those about to be demobilised. Demobilisation got under way in December and accelerated in early 1919. In January 12th Suffolks moved to Bondues, near Lille, and then to Roubaix. Each of the war-formed service battalions was presented with a King's colour and 12th Suffolks received its at Roubaix. During February 6 officers and almost 200 ORs were transferred to 11th Suffolks for service with the Allied occupation forces in Germany. During March the battalion was reduced to a cadre of 9 officers and 47 ORs, which moved to billets at Herseaux. In June it returned to England and was disbanded at Bury St Edmunds on 23 June 1919.

== Insignia ==
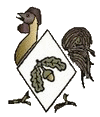
40th Division's formation sign after Bourlon Wood.

14th (Light) Division's formation sign.

The battalion wore the Suffolk Regiment cap badge and a brass 'SUFFOLK' title on the shoulder straps. Initially, 40th Division used a white diamond as its formation sign; later the diamond was superimposed on a bantam cock (which had already been used by the bantam 35th Division). After the fighting in Bourlon Wood the division added an acorn and two oak leaves on the diamond. This final version was issued as a cloth arm badge in late 1917 or early 1918. The insignia of 121st Bde was a black diamond, bisected vertically by a coloured stripe, which was blue in the case of 12th Suffolks; this was also worn on both sleeves beneath the seam. After the battalion transferred to 14th (L) Division it wore blue shoulder patches in geometric shapes: a triangle (apex upwards) for A Company, a square for B, a circle for C, a vertical rectangle for D and a vertical diamond for HQ. The divisional formation sign was a horizontal rectangle in green (for light infantry) with two white stripes: one horizontal and one running diagonally from top left to bottom right.

== Memorials ==
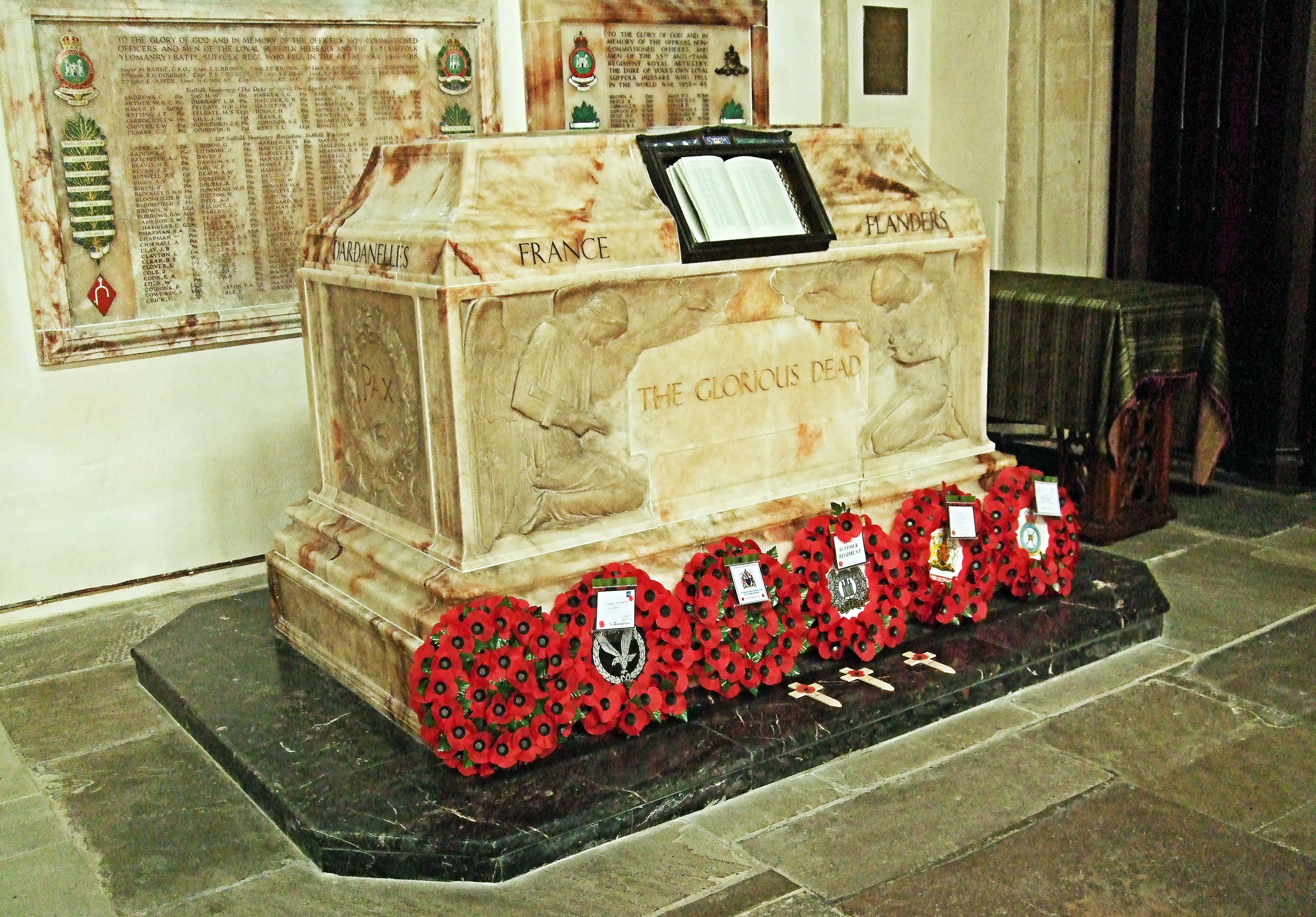
The Cenotaph to the dead of World War I in the Suffolk Regimental Chapel.

The Suffolk Regimental Chapel is in St Mary's Church, Bury St Edmunds, and includes a cenotaph to honour the men who died in World War I. After 12th Suffolks was disbanded the King's Colour was laid up in the regimental chapel.

40th Division's memorial is an altar in Bourlon Church dedicated on 27 May 1928 to those who died in Bourlon Wood in November 1917. (14th (L) Division's memorial was originally placed at Bellewaarde where it first fought in 1915; it now stands at Hill 60, not far from the Bluff.)

There is a stained glass window in Sacred Heart Church, Petworth, West Sussex, dedicated to the memory of Lt-Col Eardley-Wilmot. He has no known grave so his name appears on the Arras Memorial to those British soldiers who died in the Arras sector who have no marked grave, together with 42 of his officers and men. He is also listed on the war memorials at Tonbridge School and the Royal Military Academy Sandhurst.
