= 21st (Service) Battalion, Middlesex Regiment (Islington) =

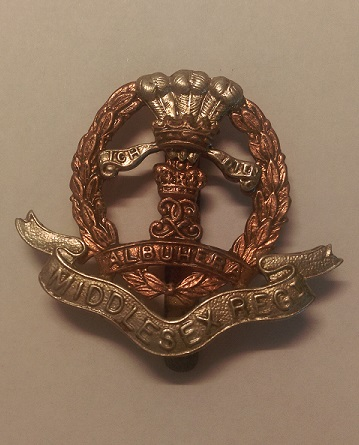
- Cap badge of the Middlesex Regiment
- Active: 18 May 1915–14 December 1918
- Allegiance: United Kingdom
- Branch: New Army
- Role: Infantry
- Size: One Battalion
- Part of: 40th Division
- Garrison/HQ: Islington
- Nickname: Islington Pals
- Patron: Mayor and Borough of Battersea
- Engagements: German Retreat to the Hindenburg Line; Bourlon Wood; German spring offensive Battle of the Lys

The 21st (Service) Battalion, Middlesex Regiment (Islington) (21st Middlesex) was an infantry unit recruited as part of 'Kitchener's Army' in World War I. It was raised in the spring of 1915 by the Mayor and Borough of Islington in North London. Serving on the Western Front from June 1916 it saw action against the Hindenburg Line and at Bourlon Wood. It then fought through the German spring offensive and the Battle of the Lys. Reduced to a training cadre following heavy casualties, the battalion was sent back to England, where it was disbanded at the end of the war.

== Recruitment and training ==
Alfred Leete's recruitment poster for Kitchener's Army.

On 6 August 1914, less than 48 hours after Britain's declaration of war, Parliament sanctioned an increase of 500,000 men for the Regular British Army. The newly appointed Secretary of State for War, Earl Kitchener of Khartoum, issued his famous call to arms: 'Your King and Country Need You', urging the first 100,000 volunteers to come forward. Men flooded into the recruiting offices and the 'first hundred thousand' were enlisted within days. This group of six divisions with supporting arms became known as Kitchener's First New Army, or 'K1'. The K2, K3 and K4 battalions, brigades and divisions followed soon afterwards. But the flood of volunteers overwhelmed the ability of the Army to absorb them, and the K5 units were largely raised by local initiative rather than at regimental depots, often from men from particular localities or backgrounds who wished to serve together: these were known as 'Pals battalions'. The 'Pals' phenomenon quickly spread across the country, as local recruiting committees offered complete units to the War Office (WO). Encouraged by this response, in February 1915 Kitchener approached the 28 Metropolitan Borough Councils in the County of London, and the 'Great Metropolitan Recruiting Campaign' went ahead in April, with each mayor asked to raise a unit of local men.

One such unit was raised on 18 May 1915 by the Mayor and Borough of Islington as the 21st (Service) Battalion, Middlesex Regiment (Islington). (Note: Islington had been in the County of Middlesex until the County of London was created in 1889; it still formed part of the Middlesex Regiment's recruitment area.) Lieutenant-Colonel Edward St Aubyn Wake, retired from the Indian Army, was appointed as the commanding officer (CO) on 2 June.

The battalion was assigned to 118th Brigade of 39th Division. 118th Brigade began to form in London in July. Initially it comprised two service battalions of the Middlesex Regiment (the 20th (Shoreditch) and 21st (Islington)) and two of the Queen's Own (Royal West Kent Regiment) (the 10th (Kent County) and 11th (Lewisham)). 39th Division began to assemble early in August 1915, but it was not until the end of September that 118th Bde joined it at Aldershot. However, on arrival 118th Bde was reorganised, the Royal West Kent battalions moving to 41st Division and being replaced by 13th East Surrey Regiment (Wandsworth) from 41st Division and 14th Battalion, Argyll and Sutherland Highlanders. In November the division moved to Witley Camp in Surrey, where it continued its training, returning to Aldershot from 2 to 12 February for musketry training with rifles that had only been issued a few days before.

Mobilisation orders had been received during February and advance parties of the division had already left for the Western Front. But the Pals battalions of 118th Bde had not completed their training, so it was decided to leave them behind to join 40th Division when the rest of 39th Division left for France. 40th Division had originally been a 'Bantam' formation, composed of men below the normal regulation height for the British Army. However, the supply of strong, fit men of this description had dried up, so some of the battalions were amalgamated., the gaps being filled by the normal height battalions of 118th Bde. 20th and 21st Middlesex were transferred to 121st Bde to serve alongside the Bantams of 12th Suffolk Regiment (East Anglian) (which had just absorbed the 22nd Middlesex) and the 13th Green Howards. Lieutenant-Col Wilfrid Samuel took over command of 21st Middlesex on 1 March.

These reorganisations had held up the training process, but once they were completed 40th Division intensified the training, specialists such as snipers and 'bombers' were selected and trained, and all the necessary arms and equipment were issued. In mid-May the division was warned to prepare for service with the British Expeditionary Force (BEF) on the Western Front. 21st Middlesex mobilised at Woking on 27 May and on 5 June entrained for Southampton Docks with a strength of 33 officers and 990 other ranks (ORs). They embarked that evening, the transport and part of the battalion aboard the transport Rossetti, and the main body on the Caesarea. They landed next day at Le Havre.

=== 28th (Reserve) Battalion ===
The depot companies of the 21st (Islington) Battalion amalgamated with those of the 20th Middlesex at Shoreditch to form the 28th (Reserve) Battalion, Middlesex Regiment. Its role was to train reinforcement drafts for the two parent service battalions. By December 1915 it was at Northampton in 23rd Reserve Brigade, alongside the 24th and 27th (Reserve) Battalions of the Middlesex Regiment. In May 1916 the brigade moved to Aldershot.

On 1 September 1916 the Training Reserve was established following the introduction of conscription, and 28th (R) Bn Middlesex became 102nd Training Reserve Battalion, though the training staff retained their Middlesex badges. On 27 October 1917 the battalion reverted to the Middlesex Regiment as 53rd (Young Soldier) Battalion, carrying out initial training of conscripts. After the Armistice with Germany it was converted into a service battalion on 8 February 1919 and was then sent to join the British Army of the Rhine, where it was absorbed into 23rd Bn, Middlesex Regiment (2nd Football) on 10 March.

== Service ==
By 9 June 1916 40th Division had concentrated at Lillers, near Béthune. 21st Middlesex spent its first weeks in France on further training. In late June 40th Division moved to the Calonne sector behind 1st Division, where from 27 June 21st Middlesex was billeted in Maroc. Next day A and B Companies of were attached to 1st Northamptonshire Regiment and C and D Companies to 1st Loyal North Lancashire Regiment for instruction in Trench warfare. Although Calonne was a quiet sector the attached companies suffered several casualties. C and D Companies were in reserve for an attack by 1st Division on 'The Triangle' on 30 June. 40th Division then took over the front from 1st Division on 3 July, with 21st Middlesex in brigade support at North Maroc. It supplied large working parties to improve the support trenches, then on 5 July it relieved 12th Suffolks in the front line, including the famous Double Crassier spoil-heap facing Loos, where both sides were mining and snipers were active. Holding and repairing the trenches and barbed wire cost the battalion a steady trickle of casualties. At the end of this spell, the battalion went into billets in Petits Sains. Over the following weeks the battalion alternated spells of trench duty with the other battalions of 121st Bde at Maroc and later at Loos. Both armies were concentrating on the Somme Offensive further south, but units in the Loos sector still saw casualties mount up during the summer from occasional shelling, snipers, and trench mortars, or during patrols and raids (A Company carried out one raid on 2 October and B Company another on 18 October). No man's land was narrow enough for both sides to use rifle grenades. When out of the line the battalions supplied working parties and continued training.

40th Division was relieved at the end of October and moved south to join Fourth Army in the Somme sector. Three weeks' training was first carried out around Abbeville, with 21st Middlesex initially billeted at Candas. The division then went into the line at the end of December, with 121st Bde initially in reserve, 21st Middlesex in 'Camp 12' near Sailly-Laurette. On 31 December 21st Middlesex went into brigade support at 'Asquith Flats' near Maurepas, then in the new year began tours of trench duty at Rancourt. Here there was complete destruction left by that summer's fighting. The front line troops spent the winter among a maze of smashed and flooded trenches, under occasional bombardments. Living in these conditions the cases of sickness and Trench foot rose sharply.

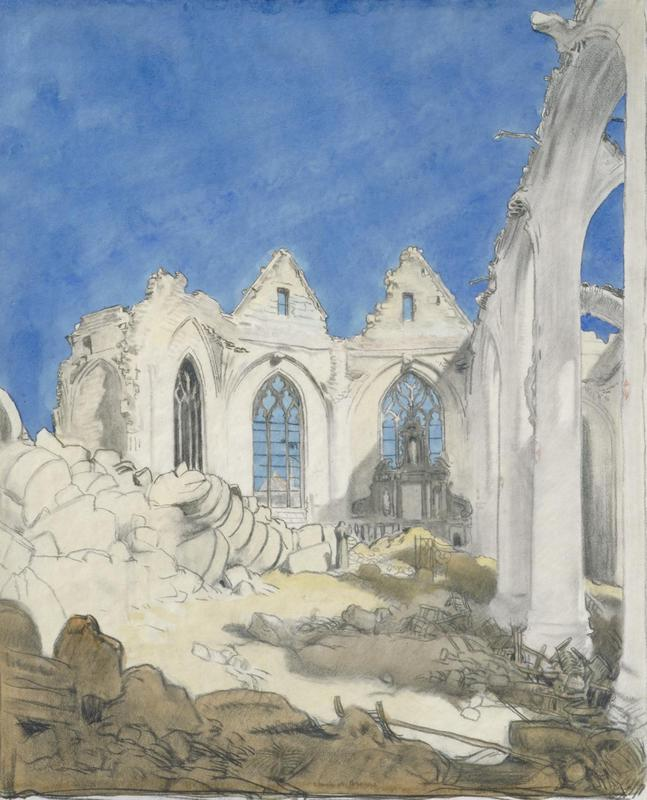
The Church, Péronne, by Sir William Orpen.

=== Hindenburg Line ===
Training for the battalions was stepped up during the winter, with emphasis on Lewis guns and the new 'fighting platoon' tactics. Trench-raiding by both sides resumed when the weather improved. On the night of 3/4 March 21 Middlesex fired red and green signal rockets (used by the Germans as 'SOS' signals to call down defensive artillery fire) to divert attention away from a major raid by the neighbouring 8th Division.

On the night of 15/16 March the battalion took over the front line at Cléry-sur-Somme. There were rumours of a German retreat and 40th Division was ordered to penetrate into the German lines at least once a week. 21st Middlesex's nightly patrols reported the German line still strongly held, but on the afternoon of 17 March 13th Green Howards found it deserted. The Germans had begun withdrawing from in front of 40th Division as part of a large-scale retreat to the prepared positions of the Hindenburg Line (Operation Alberich). B Company of 21st Middlesex immediately probed forward and established strongpoints in the German front line trench, reconnoitred the empty support and reserve trenches, and blocked the communication trenches, while other companies cut gaps through the wire. The only opposition was some erratic shrapnel fire by German artillery. By 19.30 the whole German defence system was in British hands and fires could be seen burning in Péronne beyond. Next day 40th Division began cautiously following up, with patrols out in front in contact with German rearguards. 121st Brigade moved into deserted Péronne, with 21st Middlesex occupying the height of Mont St Quentin. On 20 March 121st Bde was leapfrogged by another division taking the lead. 40th Division was then set to repairing the roads and railways that had been destroyed by the retreating enemy. Once communications had been restored, XV Corps, to which 40th Division belonged, closed up to the Hindenburg Line. On 6 April 21 Middlesex moved into Gouzeaucourt Wood. German resistance stiffened among the fortified villages they held as outworks to the Hindenburg main line. The battalion's trenches were heavily shelled on 8 April, and next day it undertook a minor operation with two platoons advancing behind a barrage to take two crossroads in front. The first was easily reached, but afterwards they ran into machine gun fire and could not hold the second, suffering numerous casualties. The battalion then had to hold off enemy counter-attacks. The battalion's losses that day were 26 killed, 38 wounded and 1 missing.

121st Brigade was resting and refitting at Étricourt when 40th Division began operations against the Hindenburg outworks, taking 'Fifteen Ravine', Villers-Plouich, and Beaucamp Ridge between 21 and 25 April. 21st Middlesex took over at Beaucamp after its capture, consolidating and wiring the new positions under cover of darkness because they were overlooked by the Germans beyond. The battalion was brigade reserve when 121st Bde took part in the last of these attacks, a large-scale raid against La Vacquerie by 40th and 8th Divisions. Over the following weeks the battalion alternated between rest billets in Sorel or Dessart Wood and the front or support lines at Villers-Plouich or in the Gonnelieu Salient. On the night of 25/26 May one of the battalion's positions was raided only minutes after relieving another unit, before it had time to put out listening posts or patrols. There was little wire in front of the positions and the battalion war diary laments that 'the enemy appeared to have complete control in 'No man's land'.' Both sides carried out offensive patrols and raiding during the summer. When not in the front line the battalions spent much of their time improving roads and trenches, digging saps forward to obtain better observation over enemy lines. On 1 June Maj J.F. Plunkett from 12th Suffolks took over temporary command of 21st Middlesex; he then moved on 12 June to do the same at 20th Middlesex while Maj E. Mcleod assumed command of the 21st. Lieutenant-Col Samuel returned during July.

=== Bourlon Wood ===
After six months' continuous service in the line, 40th Division was relieved at the beginning of October and went to the Fosseux area for rest. It then moved to the wooded area round Lucheux to begin training for the forthcoming Battle of Cambrai, with particular emphasis on fighting in woods, ready for action in Bourlon Wood under IV Corps. The battle began with a massed tank attack on 20 November that broke through the Hindenburg Line, and the division moved up on 22 November in order to attack Bourlon Wood next morning. The capture of the wood by 40th and 51st (Highland) Divisions would provide a defensive flank to allow Third Army to continue developing the successes of the first two days. 40th Division moved up during the night to take over the front, and the men were tired by the difficult approach march. The assault was launched at 10.30 preceded by a Creeping barrage of smoke, high explosive and shrapnel shells, and by tanks, with which the battalions had never worked before. 121st Brigade was on the left, with 20th Middlesex (right) and 13th Green Howards (left) leading. 21st Middlesex was echeloned in support behind the Green Howards, with the role of protecting that battalion's left flank while it was encircling the left side of Bourlon village, and to deal with any counter-attacks. As the leading battalions followed the barrage 21st Middlesex began to advance, with several pauses, until at 11.20 C Company crossed the ridge, followed in turn by B and A. C Company and half of B Company reinforced 13th Green Howards and with the help of a tank reached the Sunken Lane south-west of Bourlon village but could get no further. A Company ran into a strongpoint on the extreme left that had repulsed an attack by the neighbouring division, and the company had to mask it to prevent a counter-attack from that position. B Company suffered heavy casualties and command devolved on Company Sergeant-Major Hall, even though he was wounded in both arms. At 12.45 the battalion's left was still held up and two platoons of D Company were sent up to reinforce it. At 13.15 the rest of the company was sent up to reinforce the battalion's centre where gaps were opening. Further attempts to outflank the strongpoint were driven back by machine gun fire and a British aircraft that strafed the strongpoint was shot down while making a second pass. A request was sent back for trench mortars to deal with the strongpoint, and a company of 12th Suffolks came up from reserve to fill gaps in 21st Middlesex's line. At 16.45 parties of Germans began counter-attacking but were held off by rifle fire. Given the seriousness of the situation the battalion headquarters (HQs) of 21st Middlesex and 13th Green Howards formed a composite company at the Sugar Factory to act as a reserve. At 18.00 the British artillery put down a protective barrage and the infantry dug in along the line they had reached. That night 21st Middlesex was relieved in the front line by a composite dismounted battalion (19th Hussars and 1/1st Bedfordshire Yeomanry) from 9th Cavalry Brigade supported by 12th Suffolks. The remnant of 21st Middlesex went back to the Sugar Factory in reserve, Next day (24 November) 12th Suffolks attempted to continue the attack, while half of D Company 21st Middlesex acted as a carrying party for them; the rest of D Company was in reserve to the cavalry. 21st Middlesex was relieved under shellfire at 08.00 on 25 November, except two platoons in a support position on the ridge who could not move until after dark. That night the battalion marched back to the captured Hindenburg Support Line. In the three days in action it had suffered losses of 3 officers and 20 ORs killed, 8 officers and 99 ORs wounded and 7 ORs missing. In a speech to his men Lt-Col Samuel thanked them for upholding the traditions of the 'Die-hards'. (Note: The Middlesex Regiment gained the nickname 'The Die-hards' at the Battle of Albuera in 1811.) The whole of 40th Division was withdrawn at noon on 27 November and 21st Middlesex marched back to Ytres and entrained for billets in Bailleulmont. On 1 December 121st Bde moved into reserve at Hamelincourt with 21st Middlesex in 'Armagh Camp'.

=== Winter 1917–18 ===
On 18 December Lt-Col Samuel handed over command of 21st Middlesex to Lt-Col Herbert Metcalfe, a former Regular officer of the Northamptonshire Regiment and Inspector of Musketry who had been Chief Constable of Somerset before the war. 40th Division had taken over the line north-west of Bullecourt in the Arras sector. It occupied a captured section of the Hindenburg Line named 'Tunnel Trench' and held those positions through the winter, despite its very weak battalions. Once again the trenches became waterlogged and cases of trench foot increased. The CO and pioneer sergeant of 21st Middlesex devised a method of bringing hot water up to the front line for hot drinks. This consisted of an empty petrol tin packed with improvised insulation into a wooden box fitted with straps that could be carried on a man's back. The divisional commander urged all battalions to adopt this expedient. Trench raiding resumed, 121st Bde being the victim of a large one on 5 January 1918, when about 250 Germans supported by a heavy bombardment, an aircraft and flamethrowers attacked the right at 06.30. It took about 200 yards (180 m) of the line and a saphead from 12th Suffolks, annihilating an outpost before they were driven out. Next afternoon the Germans again captured the saphead, 12th Suffolks being unable to dislodge them until next day when A Company of 21st Middlesex attacked 'over the top' with artillery support. The Germans attacked 12th Suffolks again at dawn on 8 January and penetrated some 100 yards (91 m) down 'Tank Trench'. The Suffolks counter-attacked while D Company of 21st Middlesex bombed its way along the trench, taking 18 prisoners. After that, raiding had to be halted when a thaw made the trenches impassable: they could only be reached over the top at night. When not in the front line, 21st Middlesex was in brigade support at Mory or resting at Armagh Camp. On 12 February 121st Bde went back to Hamelincourt for a month's rest.

By the beginning of 1918 the BEF was suffering a manpower crisis. It was forced to reduce infantry brigades from four to three battalions, the surplus units being disbanded and drafted to others as reinforcements. 119th Brigade, the 'Welsh Bantam Brigade', had two battalions disbanded, so 21st Middlesex was transferred to it from 121st Bde on 5 February. 21st Middlesex received a draft of reinforcements from 17th Middlesex (1st Football), which was being disbanded from 2nd Division. The other battalions in the reformed 119th Bde were the original 18th Welsh Regiment (2nd Glamorgan) ('18th WR'), and the 13th East Surrey Regiment (Wandsworth) ('13th ESR') from 120th Bde. 119th Brigade was commanded by the controversial Brigadier-General Frank Crozier. Crozier was displeased with the reorganisation, believing that 13th ESR and 21st Middlesex had both let him down at Bourlon Wood, that Lt-Col Metcalfe was too old, and that 21st Middlesex required more training. Crozier trained the brigade hard during March, using 18th Welsh as the demonstration battalion for his methods.

=== German Spring Offensive ===
The Germans launched the first phase of their long-anticipated Spring Offensive (Operation Michael) on 21 March and secured immediate breakthroughs. At the time 40th Division was in GHQ reserve, with 21st Middlesex at Boisleux-au-Mont. When the intense bombardment was heard at 05.00 the battalion was ordered to an assembly point north of Boiry-Becquerelle then towards the threatened Henin Hill in the second line of defences. Despite chaos on the roads 119th Bde reached the hill by 22.30 and started to dig in on and behind it. However, at 00.15 it had to make another night march to go into reserve to 34th Division, which had been engaged all day. Before dawn 18th WR took up position in the Sensée Switch trench west of St-Léger, with 13th ESR in support and 21st Middlesex in reserve. By 14.15 there were no British troops in front of 119th Bde and D Company of 21st Middlesex was sent up to reinforce 18th WR. At 18.00 news came that St-Léger had been captured, but 18th WR recaptured it, stopping the German advance here for the day. By nightfall 13th ESR formed the brigade's left, facing east, 18th WR the centre, and 21st Middlesex the right, facing northeast, giving 119th Bde a semicircular frontage of about 4,000 yards (3,700 m), with its right flank north of Mory. Early on 23 March the brigade was informed that the enemy had broken through at Mory. 4th Guards Brigade (31st Division) on its left was able to extend its line, allowing 119th Bde in turn to extend to the right. From here Crozier launched an attack on Mory with 13th ESR and 21st Middlesex. 21st Middlesex had A and B Companies in the front, one company in support to keep touch with 13th ESR, and the other company in reserve. They formed up on the St-Léger–Ervillers road and set off in artillery formation at 08.45. As they topped a ridge 1,000 yards (910 m) north-east of Mory they were swept by machine gun fire but the enemy shellfire was light. The advance continued in short rushes until 21st Middlesex reached the 'Army Line' or 'Green Line' trench. They found this unoccupied by the enemy who were the far side of the wire but able to enfilade the trench. A body of Germans was reported advancing from Mory Copse, so the reserve company was sent up to meet this threat while a company of 18th WR came up and dug in behind the Middlesex's right flank. At 11.45 the wounded commander of C Company reached the battalion aid post and reported that his men were very close to Mory, on the railway embankment north-east of the village, but they were not seen again. The battalion was unable to go on, and clung to the Green Line under machine gun fire from Mory Copse and the village, until 13th ESR was able to capture the village about 17.00. However, the Green Line was so battered by shellfire that it afforded little or no cover, so in the face of German reinforcements the brigade quietly left the village after dark and then had easy targets, causing enormous casualties to the Germans massed to attack the empty village. During the night the front line troops of all three battalions under the CO of 13th ESR dug in on their position east of Ervillers. By dawn on 24 March all but 50 yards (46 m) of the trench had been dug. 21st Middlesex was shelled by a German trench mortar battery, but this was dealt with by 40th Divisional Artillery (40th DA), which also shelled the Germans in Mory Copse. When the Germans moved in mass up the valley below, 119th and 4th Guards brigades' small-arms fire from enfilade, together with 40th DA, overwhelmed them and stopped the movement. The two brigades stopped another attack (this time by small parties) about 15.00. However, by 18.00 German forces had broken through from the direction of St-Léger and 4th Gds Bde was withdrawing. At 22.30 a party of Germans rushed 21st Middlesex at the 50-yard gap in the trench, and surrounded several Middlesex parties who had to fight their way out. An unnamed battalion signaller in the front line sent word back to HQ by telephone, then sent up the SOS rockets until 40th DA responded with defensive fire. He then smashed his telephone and joined in the fighting. The isolated parties rejoined their companies, and brought in 60 Germans prisoners, who were made to carry back the wounded. The position of 119th Bde in Ervillers was critical but Crozier had no orders. He now had to put into practice the lesson of the Battle of Spion Kop that he had drummed into his officers: 'don't retire unless you're ordered to'. He expected his brigade to be 'mopped up' at daybreak on 25 March, but just in time he received permission to withdraw. The battalions fell back in turn, first 21st Middlesex, then 18th WR and finally 13th ESR, to a line north of Ervillers. All through 25 March 40th Division held off attacks, but it was relieved that night. 119th Brigade went back to Bucquoy, then next day to Bienvillers-au-Bois in response to rumours of a breakthrough by German armoured cars. 21st Middlesex reached Bienvillers first and deployed on the ridge to the south while 18th WR and 13th ESR at Monchy-au-Bois formed the left flank of 40th Division. No attack came (the 'armoured cars' were French farm tractors), and the division finally left the line overnight. Its dogged defence of the spurs overlooking the Sensée Valley had done much to prevent the Germans expanding their breakthrough north towards Arras. Brigadier-Gen Crozier reversed his previous opinion and praised the efforts of Lt-Col Metcalfe, 'a stone wall when necessary, a thrusting lance when required', and his Die-hards. The battalion had suffered 268 casualties during the battle. Metcalfe was awarded the Distinguished Service Order (DSO) for his work.

=== Battle of the Lys ===
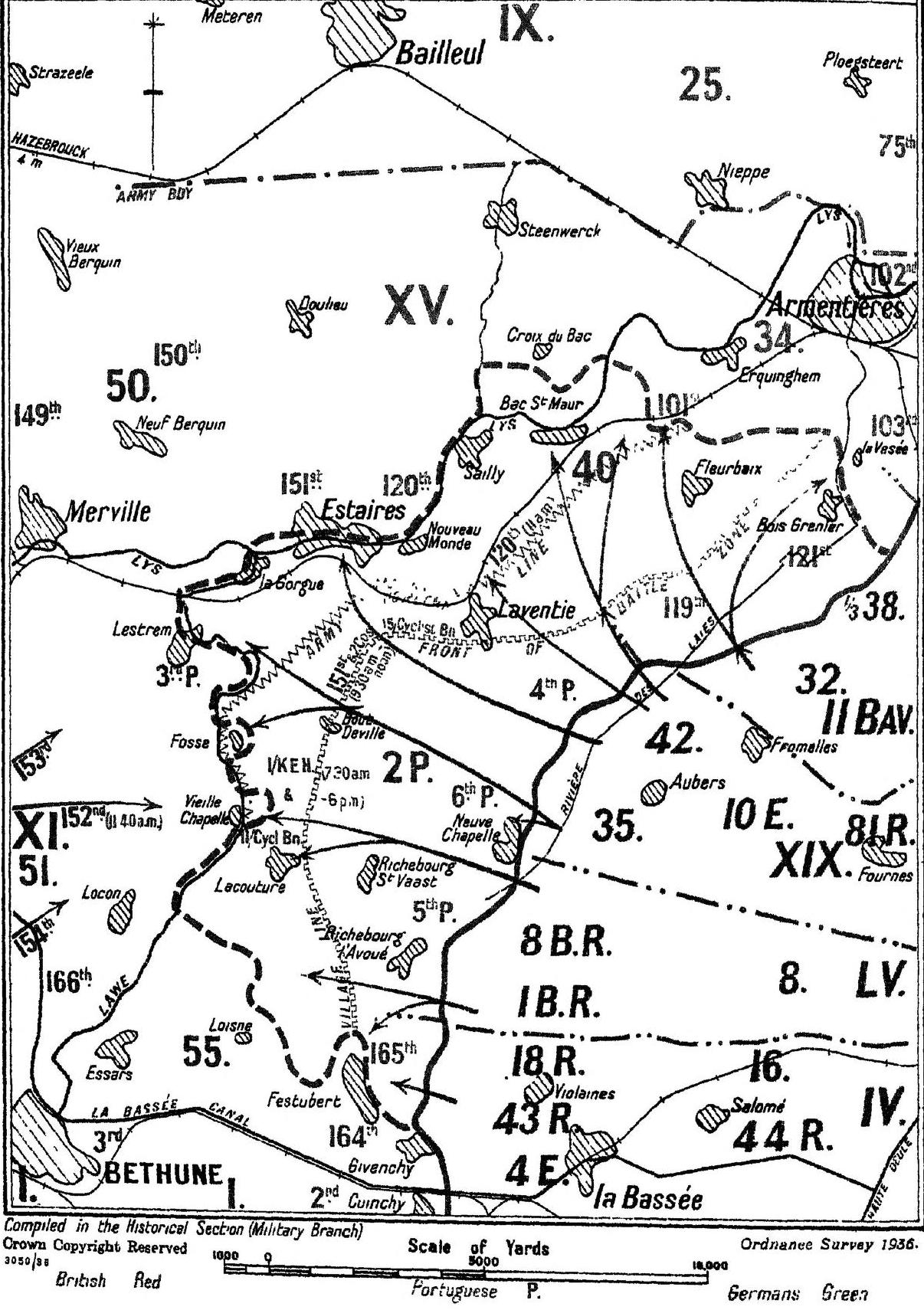
The German breakthrough to the Lys, 9 April 1918.

After the first phase of the German spring offensive, 40th Division was sent north to join First Army in a quiet sector to rest and refit. It moved to Merville, and then on the night of 6/7 April 119th Bde went into the line at Armentières next to the inexperienced Portuguese Expeditionary Corps. 18th Welsh (right) and 13th ESR (left) were in the front trenches, 21st Middlesex in brigade reserve. The brigade also reconnoitred possible defensive flank positions if the Germans broke through the Portuguese. On the night of 8/9 April patrols from 18th WR and 13th ESR entered the enemy front line, finding it unoccupied at 03.00. However, at 04.15 on 9 April the Germans launched the second main phase of their offensive (Operation Georgette, the Battle of the Lys) with a massive bombardment: while trench mortars bombed the forward trenches, heavier guns shelled strongpoints, HQs, villages and crossroads with high explosive and gas. 21st Middlesex immediately 'stood to' and moved up to its battle position behind the right flank of the brigade, taking casualties from the shelling in so doing. At 05.55 18th WR reported large numbers of Germans advancing on the Portuguese positions as the barrage lifted to the support line. Soon afterwards German troops penetrated between 18th WR and 13th ESR and headed for the support line. The forward posts of 18th WR were 'mopped up' and few got away; 18th WR's battalion HQ, and the survivors of the battalion began a fighting withdrawal. Behind, 21st Middlesex heard at this time that the Portuguese line had collapsed. During the day repeated mistakes were made distinguishing Portuguese and Germans troops, and troops withheld their fire, enabling Germans to pass 119th Bde's flank while pursuing the Portuguese. About 09.30 13th ESR holding Fleurbaix was surrounded by the Germans who had penetrated to the support line and most of the battalion was captured. C and D Companies of 21st Middlesex were sent at 10.00 to occupy the machine gun line in front but the enemy was already there and the two companies took up a line south-east of the Rue du Quesnes. Reports now arrived that the enemy was advancing towards the bridges over the River Lys at Sailly-sur-la-Lys and Bac St Maur in 119th Bde's rear and the remains of the brigade began to fall back to the river. Battalion HQ of 21st Middlesex reached Sailly having lost half its personnel including the second-in-command and the adjutant. The remnant of the battalion formed up to cover Sailly while the rest of 119th Bde with parts of the divisional machine gun battalion, the Royal Engineers, and the brigade training school withdrew over the bridges at Bac St Maur between 13.00 and 14.00. By 16.00 the enemy was entering Sailly. 21st Middlesex's Quartermaster set fire to his stores to prevent them falling into enemy hands and posted two Company Quartermaster Sergeants with Lewis guns across the river to defend the bridge until Lt-Col Metcalfe led the remnant of 21st Middlesex across. The battalion at that point consisted of 4 officers and 58 ORs, the medical officer and chaplain having stayed behind to look after the wounded until the Germans arrived to take them prisoner. The bridges were now destroyed and the available troops deployed to prevent the enemy crossing. These consisted of 2nd Royal Scots Fusiliers (2nd RSF) of 120th Bde and about 400 'details' sent by 119th Bde HQ, including small detachments of engineers, pioneers and gunners. Metcalfe organised these into a temporary unit and fed them by raiding abandoned mail bags for food parcels. The stand at Bac St Maur and Sailly-sur-la-Lys had allowed the remnants of the brigade to take up a position about 1 mile (1.6 km) back at Croix au Bac. At about 17.00 74th Bde of 25th Division arrived to relieve 119th Bde. The brigade's survivors, with the brigade school and other details were organised into a composite 119th Brigade Battalion about 300 strong, which manned the Steenwerck Switch trench that night.

At 03.45 the following day the Steenwerck Switch came under heavy shellfire but 21st Middlesex and the others held on until midday when the trench was enfiladed by enemy machine guns. The troops on the right having been withdrawn, they fell back to conform, and dug in in front of Petit Mortier. Although intermingled with the divisional pioneers (12th Green Howards) and troops of 25th Division, 21st Middlesex were back in touch with 120th Bde to the right and 121st Bde to the left. Next morning (11 April) the retirement by stages continued for another 2 km to a position at Le Verrier, near Le Doulieu, which 40th Division held all day. The composite units drove back three more attacks, during which Lt-Col Metcalfe led a counter-attack by 2nd RSF with elements of 21st Middlesex, 10th/11th and 14th Highland Light Infantry. This regained 600 yards (550 m) of lost ground, took a few prisoners and captured a machine gun, but Metcalfe was wounded in the leg. Captain Godfrey Worthington (West Indies Regiment), who had joined 21st Middlesex in October and commanded D Company at Bourlon, took over temporary command of the battalion. 119th Brigade was relieved that evening and moved off to Strazeele, though it was still daylight and the troops were harassed by German aircraft while on the move. 21st Middlesex had lost 6 officers and 25 ORs killed, 12 officers and 107 ORs wounded, 10 officers and 233 ORs missing. Lieutenant-Col Metcalfe received a Bar to his DSO for his efforts on the Lys. When he recovered from his wounds he went to command his old pre-war Special Reserve battalion, the 3rd Northamptonshires, in England.

=== Reconstitution and disbandment ===
After suffering crippling losses in these actions, 40th Division was withdrawn from the line and temporarily formed into a Composite Brigade on 18 April. Three companies of 20th Middlesex and one of 21st Middlesex together formed 'A' Battalion of this brigade, and one company from 21st Middlesex together with one of 13th ESR and two from 13th Green Howards formed 'B' Battalion. The brigade was employed to dig the Herzeele–Le Brearde Line in front of Cassel.

40th Division received numerous reinforcements, but these were hardly trained. Because of the Army's shortage of trained replacements, GHQ decided that several divisions would not be brought up to strength but instead would be reduced to 'Training cadres' (TCs) as instructors to the US Army divisions now arriving. 40th Division was among those selected, and its infantry battalions were each reduced to TCs of roughly 10 officers and 45 ORs: their surplus personnel were drafted as reinforcements to other units. On 21 April 21st Middlesex transferred 2 officers and 200 ORs to 1st Middlesex in 33rd Division, then on 5 May the battalion was reduced to TC and sent its surplus (1 officer and 438 ORs) to the Base Depot for drafting. On 18 May Acting Lt-Col Worthington was replaced in command of 21st Middlesex TC by Lt-Col Percy Hone, who had been Brigade major of 119th Bde, and Worthington resumed his substantive rank of captain and became adjutant. On 3 June the 21st Middlesex TC was transferred to 34th Division, then on 17 June it was passed on to 39th Division.

Finally, on 30 June the battalion was sent to Boulogne to join 74th Bde of 25th Division, which was being sent back to England to be reconstituted. The various TCs joined the division on board ship and immediately sailed to Folkestone. Here 21st Middlesex entrained for North Camp Station, Aldershot, reaching Mytchett Camp that evening. During July the division's TCs were sent out into Eastern Command to be reconstituted with men of Medical Category B. 21st Middlesex went to Cromer in Norfolk on 16 July where it absorbed 20th (Service) Bn Queen's (Royal West Surrey) Regiment, which had only been formed on 1 June.

The battalion trained hard, and unfit men were weeded out. A brass band was formed, which accompanied the men on route marches. The new attack formation and platoon organisation (two rifle sections and a double Lewis gun section) was practised. The battalion was to be issued with four additional Lewis guns for anti-aircraft use, and riflemen and Lewis gunners spent time on the firing ranges. However, when 25th Division returned to the Western Front to fight through the last weeks of the war, the only men of 21st Middlesex who accompanied it were those who had been earmarked to serve in the brigade trench mortar battery. Unlike 20th Middlesex, which did return to the Western Front and fought through the remainder the war with its Category B men, 21st Middlesex never went overseas again. The brass band, however, went out to join 20th Middlesex on 5 October.

Hostilities were ended by the Armistice with Germany on 11 November, and 21st (Service) Battalion, Middlesex Regiment (Islington) was disbanded in England on 14 December 1918.

== Insignia ==
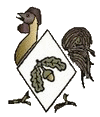
40th Division's formation sign after Bourlon Wood.

The battalion wore the Middlesex Regiment cap badge and an embroidered title on the shoulder straps with '21' over a curved 'MIDDLESEX'. The insignia of 121st Bde was a black diamond bisected vertically by a coloured stripe, which was red in the case of 21st Middlesex; this was worn on both sleeves beneath the seam. Initially, 40th Division used a white diamond as its formation sign; later the diamond was superimposed on a bantam cock (which had already been used by the bantam 35th Division). After the fighting in Bourlon Wood the division added an acorn and two oak leaves on the diamond. This final version was issued as a cloth arm badge in late 1917 or early 1918.

The 25th Division formation sign was a red horseshoe (points upward) worn on the back just below the collar. Vehicles were marked with a red and white chequer design of nine elements with squares in the outer vertical columns and rectangles in the central column.
