= 20th (Service) Battalion, Middlesex Regiment (Shoreditch) =

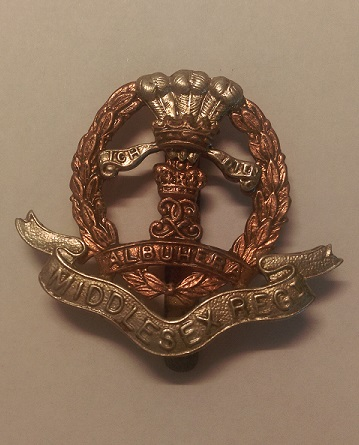
- Cap badge of the Middlesex Regiment
- Active: 18 May 1915–20 June 1919
- Allegiance: United Kingdom
- Branch: New Army
- Type: Pals battalion
- Role: Infantry
- Size: One Battalion
- Part of: 40th Division; 14th (Light) Division
- Garrison/HQ: Shoreditch
- Nicknames: Shoreditch Pals; Boxers' Battalion
- Patron: Mayor and Borough of Shoreditch
- Engagements: German Retreat to the Hindenburg Line; Bourlon Wood; German spring offensive Battle of the Lys; Hundred Days Offensive

The 20th (Service) Battalion, Middlesex Regiment (Shoreditch) (20th Middlesex) was an infantry unit recruited as part of 'Kitchener's Army' in World War I. It was raised in the spring of 1915 by the Mayor and Borough of Shoreditch in the East End of London. It served on the Western Front from June 1916, seeing action against the Hindenburg Line and at Bourlon Wood. It then fought through the German spring offensive and the Battle of the Lys. Reduced to a training cadre following heavy casualties, the battalion was sent back to England to be reconstituted, returning to take part in the final victorious Hundred Days Offensive. It was disbanded in 1919.

== Recruitment and training ==
Alfred Leete's recruitment poster for Kitchener's Army.

On 6 August 1914, less than 48 hours after Britain's declaration of war, Parliament sanctioned an increase of 500,000 men for the Regular British Army. The newly appointed Secretary of State for War, Earl Kitchener of Khartoum, issued his famous call to arms: 'Your King and Country Need You', urging the first 100,000 volunteers to come forward. Men flooded into the recruiting offices and the 'first hundred thousand' were enlisted within days. This group of six divisions with supporting arms became known as Kitchener's First New Army, or 'K1'. The K2, K3 and K4 battalions, brigades and divisions followed soon afterwards. But the flood of volunteers overwhelmed the ability of the Army to absorb them, and the K5 units were largely raised by local initiative rather than at regimental depots, often from men from particular localities or backgrounds who wished to serve together: these were known as 'Pals battalions'. The 'Pals' phenomenon quickly spread across the country, as local recruiting committees offered complete units to the War Office (WO). Encouraged by this response, in February 1915 Kitchener approached the 28 Metropolitan Borough Councils in the County of London, and the 'Great Metropolitan Recruiting Campaign' went ahead in April, with each mayor asked to raise a unit of local men.

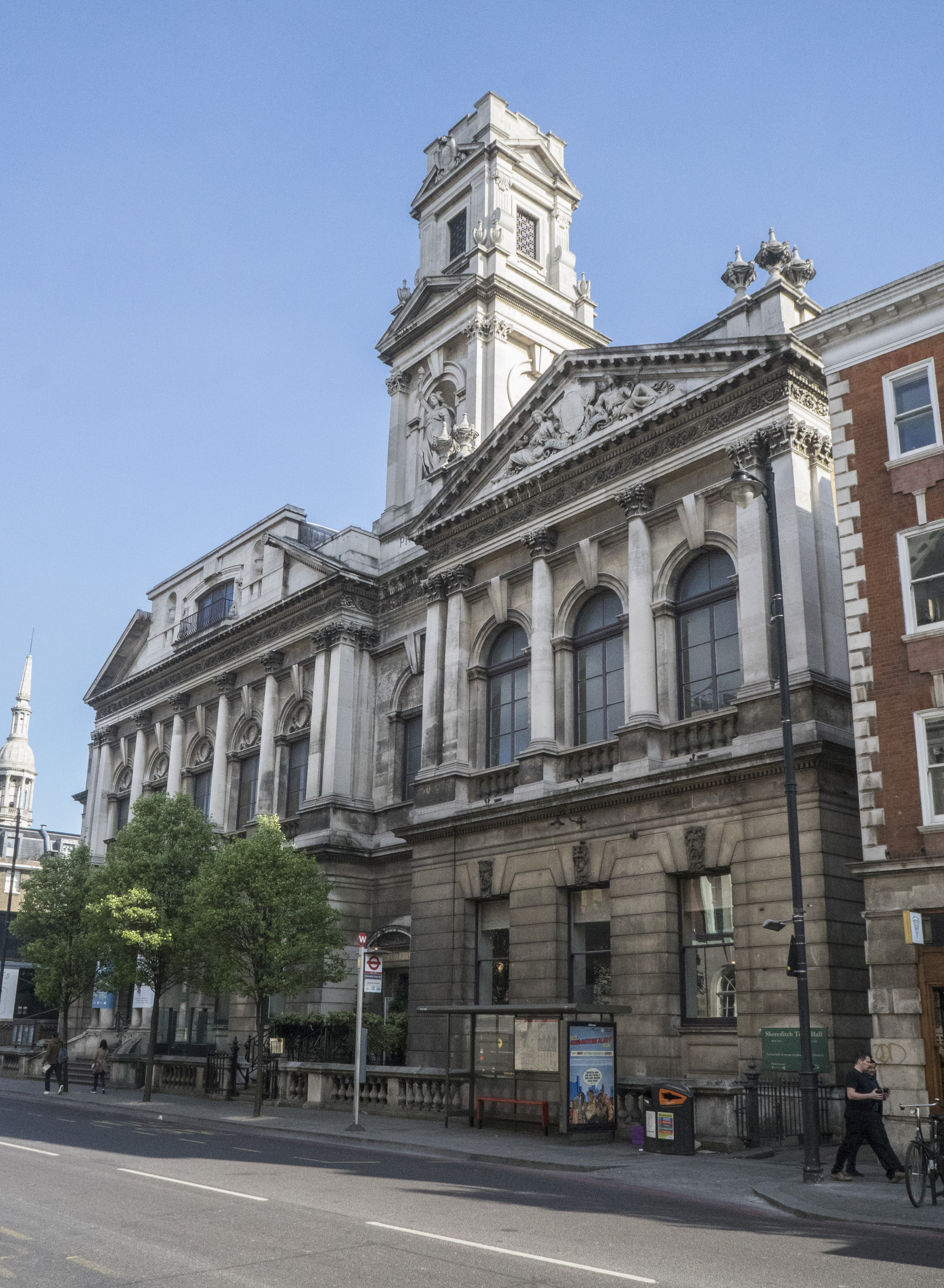
Shoreditch Town Hall, first headquarters of the battalion

One such unit was raised on 18 May 1915 by the Mayor and Metropolitan Borough of Shoreditch as the 20th (Service) Battalion of the Middlesex Regiment (Duke of Cambridge's Own) (the 'Die-Hards'). The battalion was also known as the 'Shoreditch Pals' and the 'Boxers' Battalion'. (Note: Shoreditch had been in the County of Middlesex until the County of London was created in 1889; it still formed part of the Middlesex Regiment's recruitment area.)

The Mayor, Henry Busby Bird, had formed the Shoreditch National Reserve in 1911, which reached a strength of 1200 men, of whom about 1000 had already joined up on the outbreak of World War I. When he received Kitchener's letter he quickly obtained the borough council's agreement to raise the new battalion. Recruiting began at offices in Shoreditch, Hoxton and Hackney, with battalion headquarters (HQ) in Shoreditch Town Hall. Shoreditch Borough Council obtained permission from the London County Council to use Victoria Park, Hackney, as a drill ground for the battalion, and Columbia Market in Bethnal Green was used as a temporary barracks. Lieutenant-Colonel Montagu Berthon Burnand (a retired Special Reserve officer, formerly of the 3rd (Reserve) Battalion, Suffolk Regiment) was appointed as the first commanding officer (CO) on 15 June. The recruits were formed into four service companies and two depot companies and training got under way.

The battalion was assigned to 118th Brigade of 39th Division. 118th Brigade began to form in London in July. Initially it comprised two service battalions of the Middlesex Regiment (the 20th (Shoreditch) and 21st (Islington)) and two of the Queen's Own (Royal West Kent Regiment) (the 10th (Kent County) and 11th (Lewisham)). 39th Division began to assemble early in August 1915, but it was not until the end of September that 118th Bde joined it at Aldershot. 20th Middlesex sent an advanced party down from London on 24 September to begin taking over Albuhera Barracks, and the main body, 1065 strong, entrained at Waterloo Station on 30 September for Farnborough, from where it marched into Aldershot. However, on arrival 118th Bde was reorganised, the Royal West Kent battalions moving to 41st Division and being replaced by 13th East Surrey Regiment (Wandsworth) from 41st Division and 14th Battalion, Argyll and Sutherland Highlanders. In November the division moved to Witley Camp in Surrey, where it continued its training, returning to Aldershot from 2 to 12 February for musketry training, even though the rifles had only been issued a few days before. On 10 March Lt-Col Burnand left 20th (S) Bn Middlesex to command 27th (Reserve) Bn in 23rd Reserve Brigade (see below) and was replaced on 14 March by Lt-Col Frank Dunlop (Worcestershire Regiment), who had recently returned from a staff posting at Gallipoli. At the end of the month the first large draft of 160 non-commissioned officers (NCOs) and men arrived from the 28th (Reserve) Bn to replace those who were unfit for overseas service.

Mobilisation orders had been received during February and advance parties of the division had already left for the Western Front. However, the Pals battalions of 118th Bde had not completed their training, so it was decided to leave them behind to join 40th Division when the rest of 39th Division left for France. 40th Division had originally been a 'Bantam' formation, composed of men below the normal regulation height for the British Army. However, the supply of strong, fit men of this description had dried up, so some of the battalions were amalgamated, the gaps being filled by the normal height battalions of 118th Bde. 20th and 21st Middlesex were transferred to 121st Bde to serve alongside the Bantams of 12th Suffolk Regiment (East Anglian) (which had just absorbed the 22nd Middlesex) and the 13th Green Howards. 20th Middlesex marched to join the brigade at Pirbright Camp on 3 April.

This reorganisation had held up the training process, but once it was completed 40th Division intensified the training, specialists such as snipers and 'bombers' were selected and trained, and all the necessary arms and equipment were issued. In mid-May the division was warned to prepare for service with the British Expeditionary Force (BEF) on the Western Front. 20th Middlesex absorbed a few more drafts of other ranks (ORs) from the 28th and 15th (Reserve) Battalions, bringing it up to a strength of 34 officers and 995 ORs. It mobilised at Pirbright on 27 May and on 5 June entrained at Brookwood station bound for Southampton Docks. The transport and part of the battalion embarked on the transport Rossetti, and the main. body boarded the Connaught; they landed next day at Le Havre.

Back in Shoreditch Mayor Bird continued his war work in the raising of the 28th (R) Bn and later of a Volunteer battalion in the borough, and in fundraising. He was knighted in 1919.

=== 28th (Reserve) Battalion ===
When the battalion left for Aldershot its depot companies remained at Shoreditch under Maj E.W.C. Squire, where they amalgamated with the depot companies of the 21st Middlesex from Islington to form the 28th (Reserve) Battalion, Middlesex Regiment. Its role was to train reinforcement drafts for the two parent service battalions. By December 1915 it was at Northampton in 23rd Reserve Brigade, alongside the 24th and 27th (Reserve) Battalions of the Middlesex Regiment. On 17 February 1916 Lt-Col Benjamin Roche (Bedfordshire Regiment) took command of 28th (R) Bn. In May 1916 the brigade moved to Aldershot.

On 1 September 1916 the Training Reserve was established following the introduction of conscription, and 28th (R) Bn Middlesex became 102nd Training Reserve Battalion, though the training staff retained their Middlesex badges. On 27 October 1917 the battalion reverted to the Middlesex Regiment as 53rd (Young Soldier) Battalion, carrying out initial training of conscripts. After the Armistice with Germany it was converted into a service battalion on 8 February 1919 and was then sent to join the British Army of the Rhine, where it was absorbed into 23rd Middlesex Regiment (2nd Football) on 10 March.

== Service ==
By 9 June 40th Division had concentrated at Lillers, near Béthune. 20th Middlesex spent its first weeks in France on further training, for additional Lewis gunners in anticipation of the increased allocation of these guns, for anti-gas defence, for 'bombing', for wave attacks and for digging in. On 19 June it marched to Barlin, where it was billeted in mining villages close to the front line where anti-gas precautions were in effect, and where D Company's billets were bombed during a raid by German aircraft. On 24 June A and B Companies were attached to 1st Northamptonshire Regiment and C and D Companies to 1st Loyal North Lancashire Regiment of 1st Division at Maroc near Loos for their introduction to trench warfare. Here they suffered their first casualties. 40th Division then took over the front from 1st Division on 3 July, with 20th Middlesex at Maroc near the famous Double Crassier spoil-heap. 20th Middlesex alternated spells of trench duty with the 12th Suffolks, and was billeted at Les Brebis when out of the line. Both armies were concentrating on the Somme Offensive further south, but units in the Loos sector still saw casualties mount up during the summer from occasional shelling, snipers, and Trench mortars, or during patrols and trench raids. 20th Middlesex carried out its first raid on 20 July. No man's land was narrow enough for both sides to use rifle grenades, and both employed mining, resulting in numerous craters. On 25 September the Royal Engineers (REs) fired a mine close to the existing 'Seaforth Crater', and the Middlesex successfully occupied and consolidated the new crater, which was heavily bombarded by enemy artillery and mortars (this may be the crater later referred to as 'Shoreditch Crater'). On 8 October B and C Companies of the battalion and two companies of 13th Green Howards carried out a large raid, employing Bangalore torpedoes to breach the enemy wire and supported by artillery, rifle grenades and Stokes mortars. On the morning of 11 October the REs fired a camouflet to disrupt enemy tunnelling. Parties of 20th Middlesex were ready to seize the new crater. In the event the explosion did not breach the surface, but the parties went forward anyway and occupied and consolidated the ground. Lieutenant-Col Dunlop had left on sick leave on 7 October and the battalion had been temporarily commanded by Maj C.M. Morris until 21 October, then by Maj T.M. Fitch. On 27 October Maj Francis Johnson arrived from 13th East Surreys to take command.

40th Division was relieved at the end of October and marched south to join Fourth Army in the Somme sector. Three weeks' training was first carried out around Abbeville, with 20th Middlesex billeted at Fienvillers, later at Brucamps. The division then went into the line at the end of December, with 121st Bde initially in reserve, 20th Middlesex in 'Camp 21' at Suzanne. On 31 December 20th Middlesex took over the front line at Bouchavesnes. Here there was complete destruction left by that summer's fighting. The front line troops spent the winter among a maze of smashed and flooded trenches, under occasional bombardments. Living in these conditions the cases of sickness and Trench foot rose sharply. 20th and 21st Middlesex alternated between the front line and the support dugouts at 'Asquith Flats'. Later in January the brigade occupied the front line at Rancourt, with the reserve battalion at Maurepas, and battalions at rest at Camps 12 and 21.

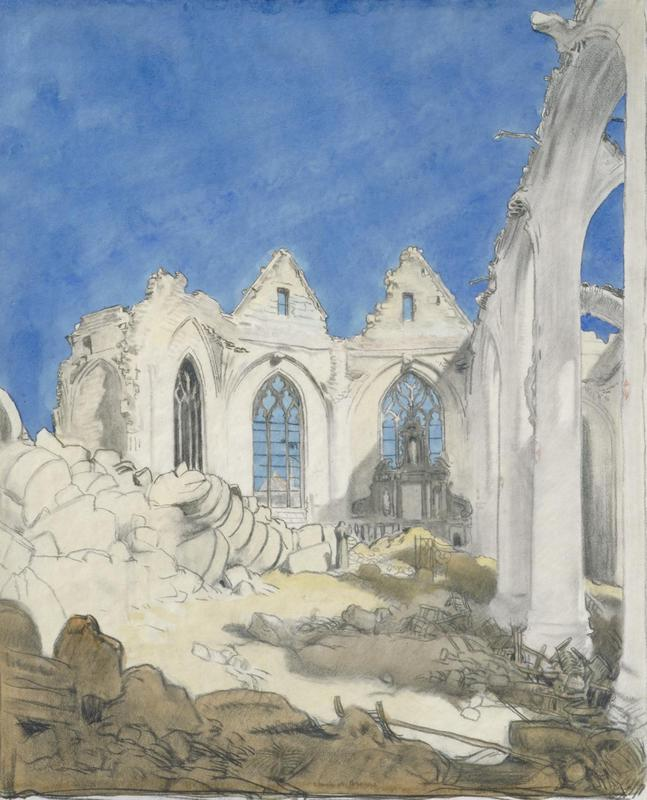
The Church, Péronne, by Sir William Orpen.

=== Hindenburg Line ===
Training for the battalions out of the line was stepped up during the winter, with emphasis on Lewis guns and the new 'fighting platoon' tactics. Trench-raiding by both sides resumed when the weather improved. Lieutenant-Col Dunlop had returned to the battalion but was wounded by a sniper on 6 March and Acting Lt-Col Johnson resumed command. On 17 March 119th Bde raided the enemy line under cover of bad weather, and reported it only lightly held. 121st Brigade probed forward and found the trenches in front empty: the Germans had begun a large-scale retreat to the prepared positions of the Hindenburg Line (Operation Alberich). The division immediately followed up cautiously through Péronne. 20th Middlesex moved forward to Mont St Quentin on 19 March and sent patrols out next day without finding any German rearguards. On 20 March 121st Bde was leapfrogged by another division taking the lead. 40th Division was then set to repairing the roads and railways that had been destroyed by the retreating enemy. Once communications had been restored, XV Corps, to which 40th Division belonged, closed up to the Hindenburg Line during the first three weeks of April. German resistance stiffened among the fortified villages they held as outworks to their main line.

121st Brigade was resting and refitting at Étricourt when 40th Division began operations against these outworks, taking 'Fifteen Ravine', Villers-Plouich and Beaucamps between 21 and 25 April. However, the brigade returned for the last of these attacks, a large-scale raid against La Vacquerie by 40th and 8th Divisions. 20th Middlesex went into brigade support on 1 May with two companies in Gouzeaucourt, and the rest of the battalion in Fifteen Ravine. On 4 May the artillery fired a practice barrage at dawn but the brigade did not attack. This dummy barrage was repeated at dawn on 5 May, after which the artillery continued firing to cut the enemy's barbed wire. At 23.00 it opened a heavy barrage on the enemy's line and 121st and 119th Bdes attacked under its cover. For 121st Bde two companies of 12th Suffolks were to attack a trench system on the left, with D Company of 20th Middlesex entering part of La Vacquerie itself and linking to 119th Bde on the right, 20th Middlesex also providing a covering party in 'Sunken Road'. When the barrage began creeping forward at 23.06, the raiders followed it closely, though there was no sign of 119th Bde. As D Company advanced it ran into the enemy counter-barrage, and three platoon officers and two platoon sergeants were soon hit. As the company continued advancing the enemy artillery shortened their range and kept it under fire. When the fire became too intense D Company could make no progress and lay down until 00.20 when it was clear that it would be unable to enter the village before the recall was sounded at 01.00. The company withdrew through the support platoons of B Company and 'moppers up' who were still waiting to enter the village. 12th Suffolks had reached their objective, finding it only to be a dummy trench system, but 119th Bde had managed to cause some destruction in the village. D Company had only lost 1 officer and 3 ORs killed, but 3 officers (including Maj Morris) and 32 ORs were wounded. Over the following weeks the battalion alternated between rest billets in Heudicourt or Dessart Wood, and the front or support lines at Villers-Guislain, 'Gauche Wood' or in the Gonnelieu Salient. Lieutenant-Col Johnson went to hospital sick on 29 May and Maj W. Kennedy of 18th Highland Light Infantry (HLI) took temporary command until Lt-Col Dunlop returned on 3 June. He in turn took over temporary command of 121st Bde for most of June, when Maj J. Plunkett from 12th Suffolks deputised for him. The battalion was very active in offensive patrolling and minor raids during the summer, 20th Middlesex carrying out one raid on the night of 22/23 May and driving off a small raid by enemy bombers on 11/12 July. When not in the front line the battalions spent much of the time digging and improving trenches and roads. Lieutenant-Col Collen Melville Richards (a Regular officer of the East Lancashire Regiment) took over command of 20th Middlesex on 12 September.

=== Bourlon Wood ===
After six months' continuous service in the line, 40th Division was relieved at the beginning of October and went to the Fosseux area for rest, with 20th Middlesexin billets at Bavincourt. At the end of the month the division trained in the wooded area round Lucheux to prepare for operations in Bourlon Wood during the forthcoming Battle of Cambrai. Third Army began the offensive with a massed tank attack on 20 November that broke through the Hindenburg Line. Two days later 40th Division moved up to Beaumetz under IV Corps to attack Bourlon Wood next morning. Its capture by 40th and 51st (Highland) Divisions would provide a defensive flank to allow Third Army to continue developing the successes of the first two days. 40th Division moved up during the night to take over the front, and the men were tired by the difficult approach march. The assault was launched at 10.30 on 23 November preceded by a Creeping barrage. 121st Brigade attacked with 20th Middlesex (right) and 13th Green Howards (left) in the lead, supported by 13 tanks of D Battalion, Tank Corps, with which the men had never worked before. A (right) and B (left) Companies of 20th Middlesex formed the first wave attacking towards the east end of Bourlon village and disappeared over the brow of the spur. C Company was in support in trenches near the Sugar Factory and D was in reserve at the Factory; 12th Suffolks moved up to take over 20th Middlesex's jumping off trench. Lieutenant-Col Plunkett, now commanding 19th Royal Welsh Fusiliers of 119th Bde in Bourlon Wood, watched 121st Bde's advance behind the tanks: 'It was rather a nice sight seeing the men moving leisurely along as if they were having a day out'. The battalion scouts of 20th Middlesex were seen to enter the village. However, at 11.30 the commander of a disabled tank withdrawing past Advanced Battalion HQ reported that the assaulting companies were held up short of the village by machine gun fire. Then at 12.20 a report came back from a corporal of B Company who thought that he was now the effective commander of the company and had only 16 men left, but that he was pushing on. Shortly afterwards the officer commanding B Company reported that he was well, but the company had indeed suffered severe casualties, and he was trying to work round the left of the village where the Green Howards should have been. A Company was ordered to keep touch with 119th Bde to the right and to push on into the village, while the support company was ordered up. By early afternoon two platoons of the reserve company had also been fed into the battle and B Company of 12th Suffolks had come up to be the battalion's reserve. The two companies at the front had lost contact with troops to their flanks, and the rest of D Company was posted as a flank guard towards Bourlon Wood. 121st Brigade Machine Gun Company was ordered to cover the south and south-west edges of the village in case the enemy counter-attacked, and the Suffolk company was sent up to reinforce the front with the vain hope that the attack could be restarted. By 15.35 Lt-Col Melville Richards could only order his men to consolidate where they were and hold on until darkness fell. 13th Green Howards and 21st Middlesex (the support battalion) to the left had suffered even worse and were relieved that night by dismounted cavalry. Along with 12th Suffolks these held the line, 20th Middlesex being in reserve in the Sunken Lane. The following afternoon 12th Suffolks tried to renew the attack on Bourlon village with some tanks only to find that the attack had already been cancelled by IV Corps. By the morning of 25 November 121st Bde's line comprised two Suffolk companies facing Bourlon, their line extended by D Company of 20th Middlesex and supported by the cavalry, while the remnants of A, B, and C Companies of 20th Middlesex were at the Sugar Factory. The rest of 40th Division continued fighting for Bourlon that day, but 20th Middlesex was relieved from the line that night. It withdrew to captured trenches in the Hindenburg Support Line, then marched back to Bertincourt early on 26 November. The whole of 40th Division was withdrawn at noon on 27 November and entrained for billets in Bailleulval.

=== Winter 1917–18 ===
40th Division then took over the line north-west of Bullecourt in the Arras sector. It occupied a captured section of the Hindenburg Line named 'Tunnel Trench' and held those positions through the winter, despite its very weak battalions. Trench raiding had to be halted when a thaw made the trenches impassable: they could only be reached 'over the top' at night. On 12 February 121st Bde went back to Hamelincourt for a month's rest and training, with 20th Middlesex accommodated at 'Armagh Camp' and then at Bailleul from 28 February.

By the beginning of 1918 the BEF was suffering a manpower crisis. It was forced to reduce infantry brigades from four to three battalions, the surplus units being disbanded and drafted to others as reinforcements. 119th Brigade was the weakest in the division and had two battalions disbanded, 21st Middlesex being transferred to it from 121st Bde which was otherwise unaffected. 20th Middlesex received 10 officers and 235 ORs as reinforcements from 16th Middlesex (Public Schools), which was being disbanded from 29th Division.

=== German Spring Offensive ===
When the German Spring Offensive (Operation Michael) was launched on 21 March 1918, 40th Division was in GHQ Reserve, with 20th Middlesex at Blairville, south-west of Arras, where it had been undergoing training since 12 March. When the attack began 40th Division was ordered forward to reinforce VI Corps. 20th Middlesex went with the rest of 121st Bde to Hamelincourt, arriving at 12.30. It was then directed to an assembly point at Saint-Léger, marching across the open ground in 'artillery formation' with the scouts out ahead, who reported that Croisilles was being heavily shelled. After linking up with the rest of 121st Bde 20th Middlesex was ordered to Mory Abbey, which it reached at 23.00. That night the battalion dug in, with C Company in the 'Army Line' or 'Green Line' rear defences north-east of the abbey, D Company south of the abbey, B Company in strongpoints between the two, and A Company in reserve to the south west; Battalion HQ was in the abbey itself with a strongpoint in the cemetery. The work was completed under intermittent shelling, particularly on C Company, which suffered some casualties. On the afternoon of 22 March the battalion was ordered to move south to protect the right flank of VI Corps which was threatened by a major breakthrough. It occupied trenches about 1,500 yards (1,400 m) north of Beugnâtre by 19.00, learning that the other battalions of 121st Bde to the south were being driven in. C and D Companies were moved across to support them and they joined 12th Suffolks in a position from the Army Line in front of Mory Copse back to the sunken road behind it where they linked up with 13th Green Howards; the rest of the Army Line on either flank was in enemy hands. During the night the enemy worked round both sides of the copse and up the sunken road, so the group with the Suffolks fell back further to a trench at right angles to Sunken Road, with troops facing towards both flanks. A and B Companies of 20th Middlesex were dug in south of Mory, where the situation was becoming critical. On the morning of 23 March C and D Companies counter-attacked alongside the Suffolks, but the attack made no progress of the right, the two companies were cut off and surrounded, and had to fight their way out. The enemy were now between the two halves of the battalion, and Battalion HQ with A and B Companies was being shelled in enfilade by a German field gun at Mory Copse. However, during the afternoon two companies of 15th Hampshires from 41st Division arrived on the right and dug in to extend 20th Middlesex's line towards 120th Bde in the Army Line. That night 12th Suffolks with the two accompanying Middlesex companies marched back cross-country and made contact with 59th (2nd North Midland) Division where they dug in along the Ervillers–Mory road on some rising ground. All through 24 March the Suffolks' position was shelled, machine-gunned, and bombed by enemy aircraft. Meanwhile, the rest of 20th Middlesex was ordered to cooperate with 14th HLI of 120th Bde to retake Mory, but the two COs concluded that this was impossible, and even to relieve 13th East Surreys who had regained a foothold in the western outskirts of Mory could not be done in daylight. In the afternoon 120th Bde and the other troops to the right were driven back and the Hampshire companies fell back to conform; 120th Bde then counter-attacked and restored the position. In the evening 20th Middlesex was ordered to gain touch with 13th East Surreys and dig in west of the Mory–Favreuil road to link with 120th Bde. Relief was promised but did not arrive, and the digging companies were shelled by their own artillery; they withdrew to the sunken road position. Here both flanks were still 'in the air' so they were ordered back to a line east of the Arras–Bapaume road, which they found already occupied by 42nd (East Lancashire) Division, sent to relieve 40th Division. 20th Middlesex went into support behind that formation on the morning of 25 March, while bitter fighting continued. The Suffolks' group had come under attack during the night and after holding it off for some time fell back to the Ervillers–Béhagnies road where the Regimental Sergeant-Major of 12th Suffolks had collected stragglers and detachments from a variety of units and organised a line, which held up the enemy advance for about 12 hours. The Germans spent the morning of 25 March establishing machine guns and snipers in front of the British positions and gathering troops. The attack against Ervillers came in at 15.00 on a wide front; it did not actually reach the group with the Suffolks, but they also had an open flank and at 20.00 were finally ordered to fall back through 42nd Division. On 26 March 42nd Division's position began to crumble under fierce attacks, and A and B Companies found themselves attacked once more, being driven back to Battalion HQ. They retired, putting out flank guards and leaving a rearguard to slow up the enemy working down the Gomiécourt–Béhagnies road while all round British troops streamed past in retreat. The battalion went back through Ablainzevelle and Monchy-au-Bois, unable to contact Brigade HQ. Finally, on 27 March the battalion was ordered to Sus-Saint-Léger, where the detachment with 12th Suffolks had been sent the day before. The Germans had been held and the 'Great Retreat' had ended.

=== Battle of the Lys ===
After the first phase of the German spring offensive, 40th Division was sent north to Merville to join First Army to rest and refit in a quiet sector. 20th Middlesex went into reserve in the Bois-Grenier sector before going into the line on 5/6 April, where it received a draft of 96 men from 51st (Graduated) Bn, Middlesex Regiment, in England. After several days' planning, B Company launched a raid on the night of 8/9 April. At 04.15. just as it started, 'SOS' signals went up from the British lines to the right as the Germans launched the second main phase of their offensive (Operation Georgette, the Battle of the Lys). The raiders returned to their outpost line. The offensive began with a massive bombardment: while mortars bombed the forward trenches, heavier guns shelled strongpoints, HQs, villages and crossroads with high explosive and gas shells. Much of this was directed at 40th Division's right-hand neighbours, the inexperienced Portuguese Expeditionary Corps. As the Germans attacked and penetrated the Portuguese positions they began to 'roll up' 40th Division's line. A dense fog contributed to the confusion. At 09.00 Lt-Col Richards heard that the front line of 13th East Surreys (119th Bde) on the right had gone. He ordered the right company of 20th Middlesex to form a defensive flank. Shortly afterwards a wounded East Surrey Company Sergeant-Major arrived to say that the support line of that battalion had also been overwhelmed and that the enemy were advancing towards 20th Middlesex's HQ. The second-in-command and adjutant took the battalion orderlies to man 'Gunner's Walk', but they were overrun and captured before they could get there. Lieutenant-Col Richards and some of the HQ personnel escaped and formed a defensive flank, first in 'City Road', as C Company came up from support, then in 'Shaftesbury Avenue' where A Company was posted. This line linked up with the support company of 13th Green Howards. At 21.00 both battalions were put under command of 34th Division, whose southern flank they were protecting. Nothing more was heard of B and D Companies, which had been in the outpost line and had been overwhelmed, though the left half company had put up a stout resistance in 'Moat Farm Avenue'. That night the right of the south-facing defensive flank was extended as far as the River Lys by 12th Suffolks from 121st Brigade reserve and 34th Division's reserve brigade (101st), filling the gap to where 119th and 120th Bdes had been forced back over the river. Next day (10 April) this line protected 34th Division as it withdrew through Armentières towards the Lys before the salient was cut off. When the time came, the remnants of 121st Bde retired through Armentières, where German patrols were already active, and crossed the Lys to enter the line gathering in front of Nieppe. Part of A Company, 20th Middlesex, went back to Petit Sec Bois, near Vieux-Berquin, where it joined the battalion transport, and then both went on to Hazebrouck. The rest of A Company attached itself to 29th Division which had arrived near Nieppe. Lieutenant-Col Richards with just 23 ORs linked up with the remnants of 12th Suffolks and 13th Green Howards, which formed a composite '121st Bde Battalion' under his command. During 11 April a party of the enemy appeared around La Rue du Sac and Pabot, behind the left rear of the Nieppe defences. These were thrown out by a vigorous attack by Richards with his composite battalion, some of the 3rd Australian Tunnelling Company and a company of 34th Division's pioneer battalion, 18th Northumberland Fusiliers. After a quiet night 121st Bde Bn was relieved next day by 29th Division and took up a position on the Bailleul–Nieppe road just north of at La Crèche. On 12 April they marched to Strazeele where 40th Division was re-assembling in reserve. The composite battalion, consisting of 5 officers and 187 ORs in three companies, dug in all night. As stragglers came in, the number rose to about 230 ORs next day, and in the evening the battalion marched to Hondeghem to join up with the transport and some reinforcements from 7th London Regiment, who were split up between the companies. It then bivouacked for the night at Bavinchove. On 14 April it marched to billets in Saint-Omer, remaining in this area for the rest of the month.

=== Reconstitution ===
After suffering crippling losses in these actions, 40th Division was withdrawn from the line and temporarily formed composite units. 20th Middlesex's casualties during the battle amounted to 1 officer and 8 ORs killed, 3 officers and 59 ORs wounded or gassed, 17 officers and 281 ORs missing, many of them later reported as prisoners-of-war. Over the following days other stragglers came in, including the men of A Company who had distinguished themselves in action with 2nd Hampshire Regiment of 29th Division. The battalion also received drafts from 51st Middlesex and 7th Londons. On 18 April, A, B and D Companies of 20th Middlesex were reformed, and together with one attached company from 21st Middlesex, formed 'A' Battalion of '40th Division Composite Brigade'. At the end of April the composite brigade was digging defences near Proven and training in case it needed to come into action.

40th Division received numerous reinforcements, but these were hardly trained. Because of the Army's shortage of trained replacements, GHQ decided that several divisions would not be brought up to strength but instead would be reduced to 'Training cadres' (TCs) as instructors to the US Army divisions now arriving. 40th Division was among those selected, and its infantry battalions were each reduced to TCs of roughly 10 officers and 45 ORs: their surplus personnel were drafted as reinforcements to other units. On 6 May 4 officers and 760 ORs of 20th Middlesex went to the Base Depot for drafting, while those retained for the TC and the battalion transport remained camped at Klinderbelke near St-Omer. The cadre moved to Terdeghem on 9 May, where it was billeted in a large house, and was employed in reconnoitring a new Winnezeele defence line.

On 31 May the 20th Middlesex TC was transferred to 16th (Irish) Division. The cadre moved to Desvres to join 48th Bde of this formation and to train troops of 59th US Infantry Regiment. The TC also took over a number of NCO instructors left by the Irish regiments. On 8 June 59th Rgt left and next day 319th US Infantry Rgt arrived to go through the same course with 20th Middlesex and a TC from 6th Royal Munster Fusiliers just arrived from Palestine. On 16 June 16th (I) Division was ordered to proceed to England to be reformed, while 20th Middlesex would join 14th (Light) Division in England to reform. The cadre arrived by train at Boulogne that night in the middle of an air raid but crossed without incident to Folkestone next day. The cadre then went by another train to Brookwood and was sent into Bullswater Camp. The officers and NCOs of the TC were informed that they would be joining 34th (Service) Battalion, Middlesex Regiment, which had been formed on 1 June at St Olaves in Norfolk from men of B1 and B2 medical categories. Drafts of 74 ORs from 3rd (Reserve) Bn, East Surreys, and about 20 from The Buffs arrived first, followed on 19 June by 34th Middlesex, consisting of 22 officers (mostly from Cyclist and Yeomanry regiments) and 829 ORs, who were either returning wounded or had never been passed as fit for overseas service. The TC staff took over the battalion staff roles from CO (Lt-Col Richards) downwards. While about 450 men who were not fit for trench duty were sent back to 225th Mixed Brigade at St Olave's (probably to join 32nd Middlesex), drafts continued to arrive from a large number of other regiments, including the Queen's, Bedfords, Hampshires, East Surreys, and Montgomeryshire Yeomanry. Despite an outbreak of Spanish flu, and further unfit men being weeded out, the reorganisation was completed by 1 July. Together with 12th Suffolks and 10th HLI, also from 40th Division, the reconstituted battalion (now officially designated as the 20th Middlesex, not the 34th) formed 43rd Bde.

At the beginning of July 14th (L) Division returned to the Western Front. 20th Middlesex (with a strength of 39 officers and 623 ORs) went by train to Folkestone and landed at Boulogne on 5 July. The division assembled round Wierre-Effroy outside Boulogne and resumed training and providing working parties, 20th Middlesex initially at Boursin, later at Terdeghem. There it received another draft of 232 men from 'every conceivable regiment in the British Army', but described by the War Diary as 'not a bad lot, in spite of being category B1'. At the end of the month the battalion moved to Nort-Leulinghem with a strength of 39 officers and 842 ORs. By mid-August, with the Allied Hundred Days Offensive under way, the division was deemed sufficiently fit and trained to be able to hold the line in a quiet sector under Second Army. 20th Middlesex carried out a series of marches to the Ypres Salient where on 18 August it arrived at 'Siege Camp'. It took over a section of the front line on 19/20 August, suffering a few casualties from shellfire during the relief and more the following day. The following night the battalion sent out patrols who found no enemy in the trenches immediately opposite, though movement across No man's land was difficult in the mud. On 22 and 23 August the battalion snipers carried out daylight patrols as far as 'Gordon House' and 'Moated Grange', again finding no sign of the enemy. However, the neighbouring US regiment withdrew from its front line in expectation of an enemy barrage and attack. This confusing situation was resolved a few days later when the Germans began a retirement from Kemmel Hill, but by then 20th Middlesex had been relieved, on 23/24 August, after which it alternated with the rest of the brigade between the front and support lines and rest at 'Orilla Camp'. During the month Maj William Milne had taken over command of the battalion. From 14 to 20 September 121st Bde underwent further training at 'School Camp' at Sint-Jan-Ter-Biezen near Poperinge before returning to the line at 'The Bluff' beside the Ypres–Comines Canal near Voormezeele.

=== The Bluff ===
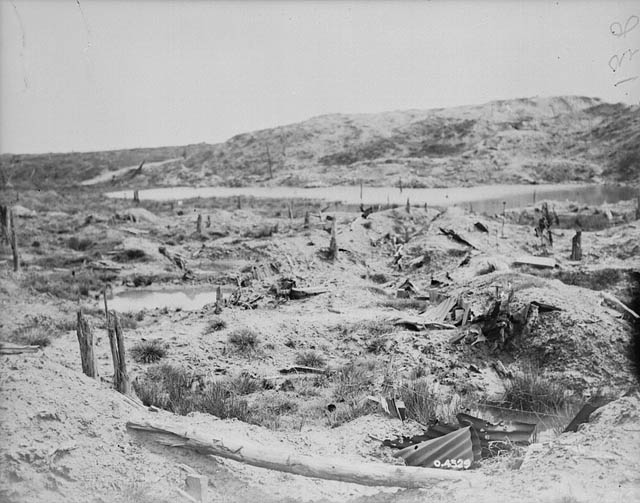
The Bluff, photographed just after the war.

The Allies launched a coordinated series of offensives on 26–29 September. Second Army's attack (the Fifth Battle of Ypres) began on 28 September. The attack was a surprise, with no preliminary bombardment, but the assaulting troops were preceded by a dense creeping barrage. Despite the acknowledged weakness of 14th (L) Division, it had been given one of the toughest objectives: the 'Bluff'. This spoil heap from the construction of the canal had been fought over and undermined since early 1915: in the words of the Official History it 'bristled with machine guns and was expected to prove troublesome'. (Note: It is possible that the Bluff was assigned to 14th (L) Division because the original division had defended it with distinction early in 1916; the division's memorial has been repositioned nearby.) 43rd Brigade attacked along the canal, with 12th Suffolks on the north bank, 20th Middlesex on the south, and 10th HLI in reserve. The Middlesex attacked with A (right) and B (left) Companies in front, formed up along 'Middlesex Road', C (right) and D (left) 400 yards (370 m) behind in support, each company in two waves formed of lines of 'worms' (sections in single file). The attackers' helmets, brasses and bayonets were deliberately dulled, and the assembly was carried out silently, being completed an hour before Zero at 05.30. From Middlesex Road the ground rose gently but was deeply pitted with shellholes, overgrown with weeds and broken wire, making for bad going. The elongated 'Spoil Bank' along both canal banks was also covered with shellholes. When the barrage came down at Zero the leading waves set off. Although the men were of low medical category they were keen and confident and moved across the ground smartly, keeping close to the barrage. At first no information came back, and Battalion HQ of 20th Middlesex sent some of the snipers forward to find out the situation. About 07.20 parties of prisoners started to come back, with a few Middlesex wounded, with news that the first objective had been taken by 06.45. After 12th Suffolks had secured the Bluff, 20th Middlesex on the south side of the canal were able to pass it and continue up the rising ground to take their final objective, the ruins of 'White Chateau', by 08.20 without much opposition. This gave excellent observation east over the country beyond and south along the Messines Ridge, which was made untenable for the enemy. Only on the battalion's right, where the neighbouring battalion could not be found, was there any hold-up, so 20th Middlesex formed a defensive flank in that direction. 43rd Brigade having completed its task, other formations continued the battle on either flank. Battalion HQ moved up to White Chateau next day while the companies consolidated the position they had won. That night the battalion was relieved and went back to 'Smythe Camp' near Dickebusch, the troops being reported to be very cheerful'. The battalion had gone into action with 20 officers and 545 ORs and had lost 13 ORs killed, 2 officers and 58 ORs wounded, and 6 missing. It had captured about 210 prisoners, six field guns, two trench mortars and numerous light and heavy machine guns.

=== Courtrai and the Scheldt ===
20th Middlesex went from Smythe Camp to Potijze, then on 3 October began work on repairing the Menin Road, which was vital to support Second Army's advance. It received a draft of 50 reinforcements and the band of the 21st Middlesex (which had been reconstituted in England but never returned to the Western Front.) The second-in-command, Maj John Musk (a Territorial Force officer originally from the Huntingdonshire Cyclist Battalion), took over temporary command on 11 October. Next day 14th (L) Division was moved up for the Battle of Courtrai. 20th Middlesex went by train to Wulverghem. where the tented camp came under intermittent shellfire. It marched up into the line at Wervik on the River Lys on 15 October, remaining in support while other parts of the division crossed the river and began the pursuit. The battalion followed on 17 October, crossing unstable narrow temporary bridges, and then marched through crowds of liberated civilians before taking over the front of the advance at Mouscron on the evening of 18 October. Opposition was encountered here along the railway, but it slackened during the night and the battalion was on its intended position by 06.00 next morning. It moved forward without opposition in the morning and occupied the next objective line. It was then ordered forward to a line between Croix Rouge and Dottignies, which its patrols had entered and reported only a few isolated Germans. The battalion lay down for the night on this line in rain and with no rations. On 20 October it was given two objective lines and set off at 08.00 against slight opposition, mainly from the high ground east of Coxghem. An 18-pounder gun of the Royal Field Artillery attached to the battalion opened fire on German artillery reported in that direction, which brought down accurate shellfire in reply on the gun and Battalion HQ. Battalion HQ was unable to take up its intended position and lost contact with the advancing companies. The right company was on the final objective for the day by 17.00, but the left company had to swing round through Espierre, which was the only place it could cross the canal. The battalion was in touch with the 12th Suffolks across the canal, but the division to the left had been held up and the battalion had to form a defensive flank until it caught up. In the evening 43rd Bde was shelled, machine-gunned, mortared, gassed and sniped by the Germans positioned across the River Scheldt. Next morning (21 October) 20th Middlesex and 12th Suffolks pushed out patrols towards the Scheldt, but the ground was too marshy to reach the bank. The battalion continued to collect German stragglers and liberated civilians. That evening it was relieved and went back to billets in Luingne and afterwards in Petit-Audenarde, where it resumed training until the end of the month while Second Army closed up to the Scheldt. It returned to Dottignies on 8 November, where Second Army was preparing for an assault crossing of the river on 11 November but enemy artillery fire died away completely and it seemed that they had pulled out. 20th Middlesex was placed on 30 minutes' notice to move, and next day went to Helchin, then on 10 November to Warcoing on the Scheldt, east of Roubaix. It was there the following day, filling in cratered roads, when the Armistice with Germany came into effect at 11.00.

=== Post-Armistice ===
For the first few days after the ending of hostilities 20th Middlesex remained at Warcoing, repairing roads and in training, with educational classes for those about to be demobilised. On 15 November the brigade marched to billets at Tourcoing where it remained until the new year. Major Milne had returned to the temporary command of the battalion on 11 November, and then Lt-Col Richards returned on 20 November. Demobilisation got under way in December and accelerated in early 1919. In January 43rd Bde moved to Bondues, near Lille, and then to Roubaix. Each of the war-formed service battalions was presented with a King's colour and 20th Middlesex received its at Roubaix. By the end of January 7 officers and 237 ORs had been demobilised, and the battalion was reduced to two companies of four platoons each. In mid-February the battalion moved to Fives where it provided escorts for trains passing through Hazebrouck station. By now it was so reduced by demobilisation that it needed reinforcements from other divisions to carry out these duties. On 2 March 2 officers and 165 ORs were transferred to 1st Middlesex for service with the Allied occupation forces in Germany. On 24 March 34rd Bde and 14th (L) Division HQs closed down and the battalion was reduced to a cadre of 36 ORs by mid-May. The cadre returned to England on 18 June where it was disbanded on 20 June 1919.

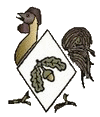
40th Division's formation sign after Bourlon Wood.

14th (Light) Division's formation sign.

== Insignia ==
The battalion wore the Middlesex Regiment cap badge and a brass title on the shoulder straps with '20' over a curved 'MIDDLESEX'. While with 118th Bde in December1915–January 1916 the battalion wore a light blue square on each sleeve. It then adopted the insignia of 121st Bde, a black diamond bisected vertically by a coloured stripe, which was yellow in the case of 20th Middlesex; this was worn on both sleeves beneath the seam. After the battalion transferred to 14th (L) Division it wore cerise shoulder patches in geometric shapes: a triangle (apex upwards) for A Company, a square for B, a circle for C, a vertical rectangle for D and a vertical diamond for HQ.

Initially, 40th Division used a white diamond as its formation sign; later the diamond was superimposed on a bantam cock (which had already been used by the bantam 35th Division). After the fighting in Bourlon Wood the division added an acorn and two oak leaves on the diamond. This final version was issued as a cloth arm badge in late 1917 or early 1918.

14th (L) Division's formation sign was a horizontal rectangle in green (for light infantry) with two white stripes: one horizontal and one running diagonally from top left to bottom right.

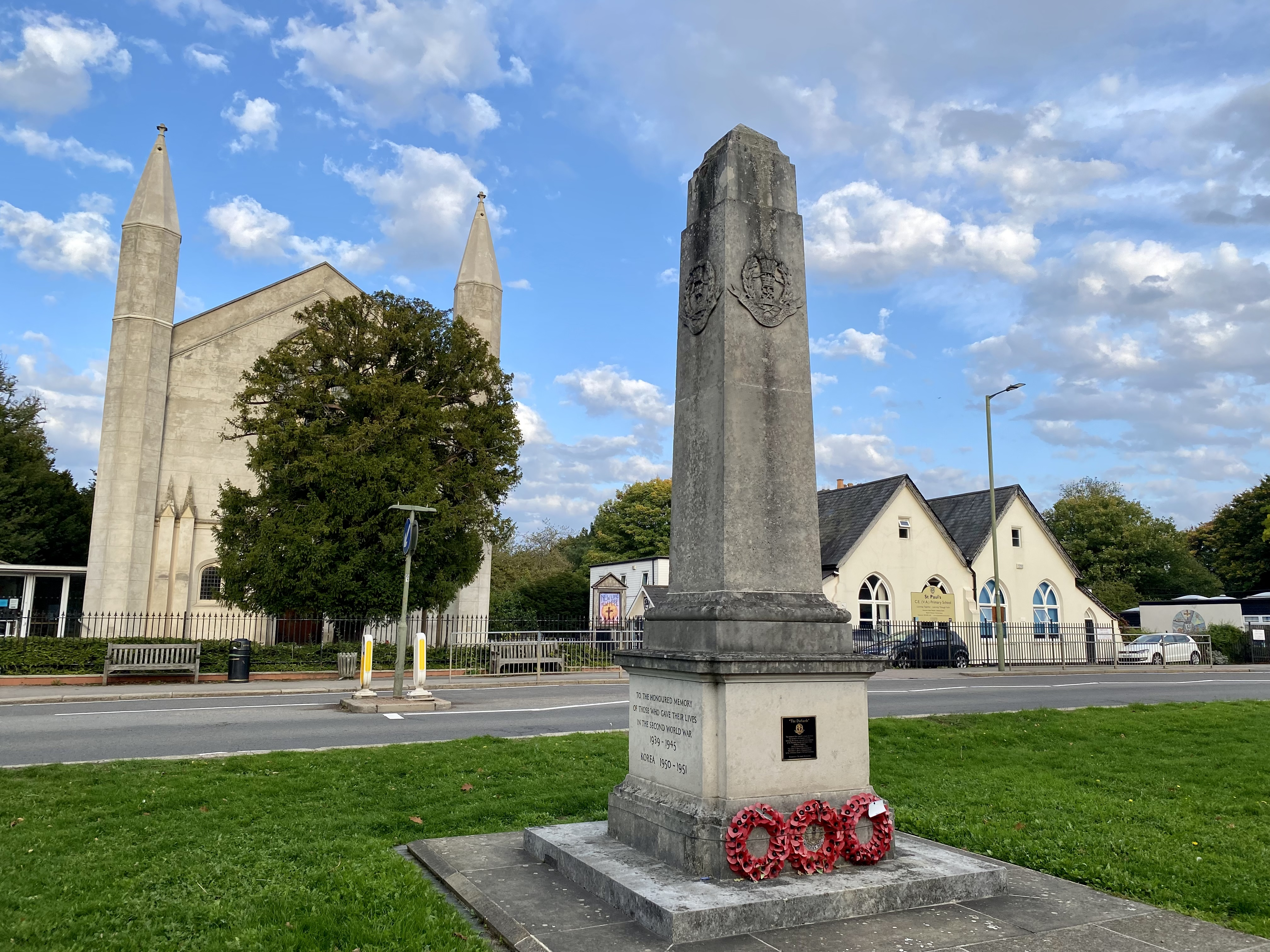
The MIddlesex Regiment's memorial at Mill Hill.

== Memorials ==
The 20th Middlesex's memorial in St Leonard's Church, Shoreditch, consists of the battalion's drums and King's colour with a casket.

The Middlesex Regiment's memorial is a stone obelisk opposite St Paul's Church, The Ridgeway, Mill Hill, close to the former regimental depot at Inglis Barracks.

40th Division's memorial is an altar in Bourlon Church dedicated on 27 May 1928 to those who died in Bourlon Wood in November 1917. (14th (L) Division's memorial was originally placed at Bellewaarde where it first fought in 1915; it now stands at Hill 60, not far from the Bluff.)
