= 121st Brigade (United Kingdom) =

121st Infantry Brigade
- Active: 7 October 1915 – 2 May 1918; 14 June 1918–May 1919; 9 November 1943 – 19 May 1944
- Country: United Kingdom
- Branch: British Army
- Type: Infantry
- Role: Infantry and deception
- Size: Brigade

The 121st Brigade (121 Bde) was an infantry brigade formation of the British Army during World War I. Part of Lord Kitchener's 'New Armies', it served in the 40th Division on the Western Front. The brigade number was reactivated for deception purposes during World War II.

== Origin ==
121st Brigade was a New Army or 'Kitchener's Army' formation raised in October 1915, in 40th Division at Aldershot. An earlier 121 Brigade had been raised in late 1914 as part of the 'Fifth New Army', but when the Fourth New Army was broken up in April 1915 to provide reserve units for the First to Third New Armies, the formations of the Fifth took their place, and the original 121 Bde was renumbered 116th Brigade. By the time the new 120 Bde was organised the flow of volunteers had dwindled, and the standard of height for infantry soldiers had been lowered in order to encourage recruitment. Some of these so-called 'bantams' were well-knit, hardy men, but many others, especially in 121st Bde, were under-developed and unfit. It was estimated that the four battalions in the brigade would provide enough fit men for only two serviceable battalions. To prevent the departure of the division to the Front being indefinitely postponed, the divisional commander asked for fresh units to be drafted in. 121st Brigade was completely reorganised in February 1916. Divisional training was then intensified and the division was warned for overseas service in May 1916.

=== Initial order of battle ===
The original units forming 121st Bde were as follows:

- 12th (Service) Battalion, Suffolk Regiment (East Anglian) – formed at Bury St Edmunds in July 1915 as a Bantam battalion
- 13th (Service) Battalion Green Howards – formed in Richmond, Yorkshire July 1915 as a Bantam battalion
- 18th (Service) Battalion Sherwood Foresters – formed at Derby on 27 July 1915 as a Bantam battalion; absorbed by 13th Green Howards April 1916
- 22nd (Service) Battalion, Middlesex Regiment – formed at Mill Hill in June 1915 as a Bantam battalion; absorbed by 12th Suffolks 2 April 1916
- 20th (Service) Battalion, Middlesex Regiment (Shoreditch) – from 118 Bde February 1916
- 21st (Service) Battalion, Middlesex Regiment (Islington) – from 118 Bde February 1916
- 121st Brigade Machine Gun Company – joined June 1916
- 121st Trench Mortar Battery – formed in France June 1916

=== Training ===
Divisional organisation and training was delayed because some of the brigades contained a large proportion of under-developed and unfit men. 121st Brigade had to undergo a drastic weeding-out and the drafting in of new battalions before it was fit for service. This was completed in February 1916. Divisional training was then intensified and it was warned for overseas service in May 1916. Disembarkation was carried out at Le Havre between 2 and 6 June, and 40th Division concentrated in the Lillers area by 9 June ready to take its place in the line. Units went into the trenches attached to formations of I Corps for familiarisation, and then the division took over its own section of line.

== Operations ==
121 Brigade's active service was entirely spent on the Western Front. During 1917 it took part in the following actions:

- German retreat to the Hindenburg Line 1917:
  - Capture of Fifteen Ravine, Villers-Plouich, Beaucamp and La Vacquerie 24–25 April
- Battle of Cambrai 1917:
  - Capture of Bourlon Wood, 23–25 November

=== Reorganisation ===
In February 1918, British brigades were reduced to a three-battalion basis and brigade machine gun companies were combined into divisional battalions. 21st Middlesex transferred to 119th Bde in 40th Division, and 121 MG Company joined 40th Bn Machine Gun Corps.

The reorganised brigade took part in the following actions:

- German spring offensive 1918:
  - Battle of St Quentin 21–23 March
  - First Battle of Bapaume 24–25 March
  - Battle of Estaires 9–11 April
  - Battle of Hazebrouck 12–13 April

Following heavy casualties during the German Spring Offensive of 1918, 40th Division was reduced to two composite brigades. 1st Composite Brigade formed under Brig-Gen J. Campbell of 121 Bde on 18 April had the following composition:

- A Bn (20th and 21st Bn Middlesex from 119 Bde)
- B Bn (13th Bn Green Howards)
- C Bn (12th Bn Suffolk and 13th Bn East Surrey Regiment from 120 Bde)
- Company, 40th Bn MGC
- Light Trench Mortar Battery (119th and 121st Batteries)
- 224th Field Company Royal Engineers
- Subsection 40th Divisional Ammunition Column Royal Field Artillery
- 137th Field Ambulance Royal Army Medical Corps
- No 4 Company 40th Divisional Train Army Service Corps

1st Composite Bde was employed on digging the Herzelee–le Brearde Line in front of Cassel. In early May 1918, all of 40th Division's remaining infantry battalions were reduced to training cadres and were posted to other formations while the trench mortar batteries disbanded. On 6 May 1918, 121 Bde's three infantry battalions were reduced to cadre and were posted away, and the trench mortar battery disbanded.

== Reconstituted ==
40th Division began to reform on 14 June 1918, and between 18 and 20 June three battalions were transferred from 59th (2nd North Midland) Division to reconstitute 121 Bde:

- 8th (Garrison) Bn Royal Irish Regiment
- 23rd (Garrison) Bn Lancashire Fusiliers
- 23rd (Garrison) Bn Cheshire Regiment

On 13 July the term 'Garrison' was dropped from the battalion titles, and the brigade light trench mortar battery had been reformed. By 18 July the brigade resumed its place in the Front Line.

The reconstituted brigade took part in the following actions:

- Hundred Days Offensive 1918:
  - Final Advance in Flanders, 28 September–19 October; 27 October–10 November
  - Fifth Battle of Ypres 28 September–2 October.

== Disbandment ==
After the Armistice, the division was engaged in road repair and refresher courses for men returning to civilian trades. Demobilisation proceeded rapidly during January and February 1919, and its units were reduced to cadre strength by March. The final cadres disappeared during May.

== Commanders ==
The following officers commanded 121 Brigade during the First World War:

- Brigadier-General J. Campbell (from 7 October 1915)
- Brigadier-General W.B. Garnett (from 27 April 1918)
- Brigadier-General G.C. Stubbs (from 17 September 1918)

== Second World War ==
121 Brigade was never reformed, but the number was used for deception purposes during the Second World War. 30th Battalion Norfolk Regiment, a line of communication unit serving in 43rd Brigade in Sicily and composed mainly of men below Medical Category 'A', was redesignated '121st Infantry Brigade' and acted as if it were a full brigade in an equally fictitious '40th Infantry Division' from November 1943 until May 1944.

== External sources ==
- The Long, Long Trail
- Commonwealth War Graves Commission
