= Sus-Saint-Léger =

- Commune
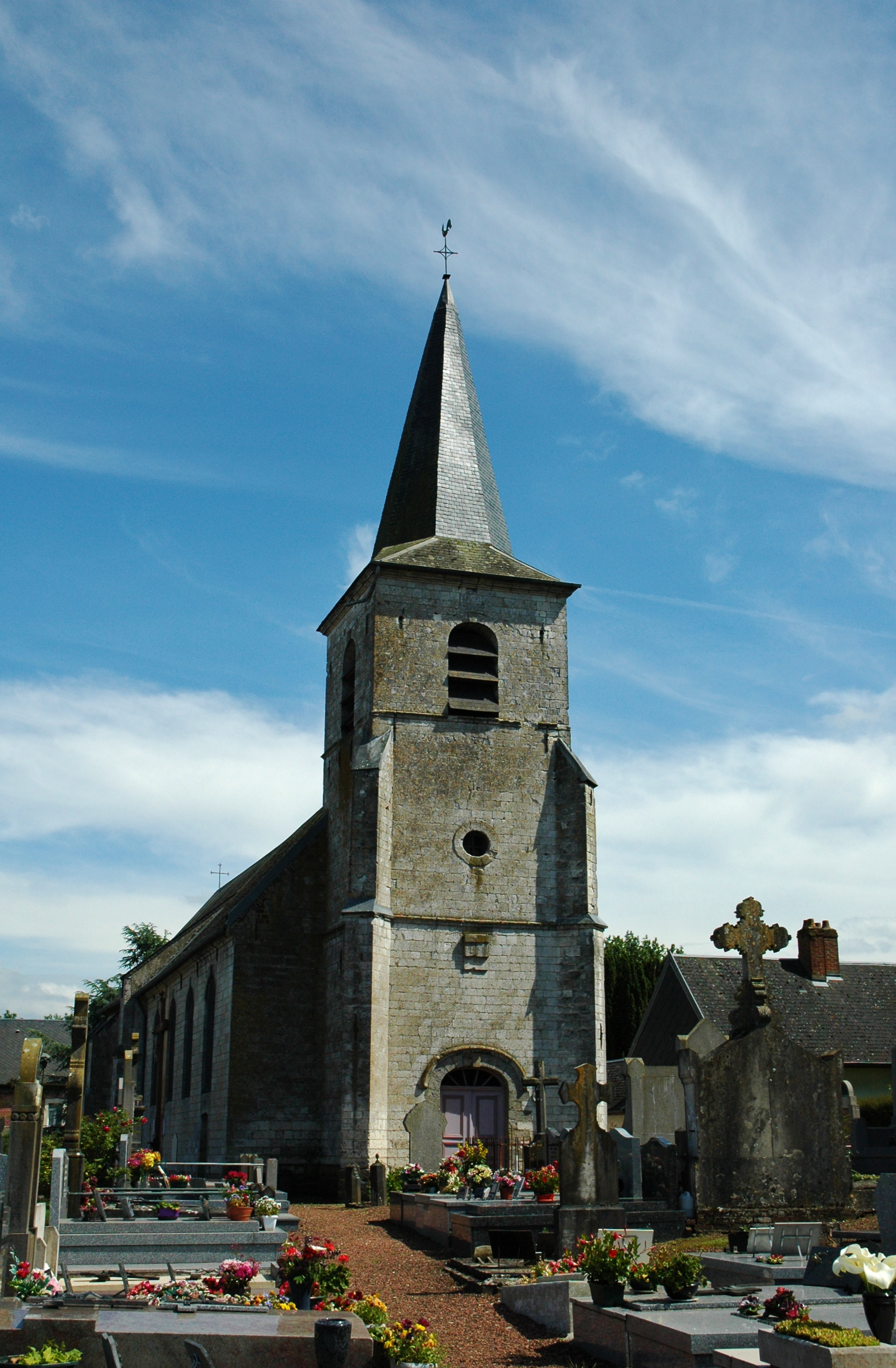
- The church of Sus-Saint-Léger

- Coat of arms
- Location of Sus-Saint-Léger
- Location within France Location within Hauts-de-France
- Coordinates: 50°14′15″N 2°25′51″E
- Country: France
- Region: Hauts-de-France
- Department: Pas-de-Calais
- Arrondissement: Arras
- Canton: Avesnes-le-Comte
- Intercommunality: CC Campagnes de l'Artois

Government
  - Mayor (2020–2026): Yves Lieppe
- Area^{1}: 7.31 km^{2} (2.82 sq mi)
- Elevation: 149 m (489 ft)
- Highest elevation: 167 m (548 ft)
- Lowest elevation: 118 m (387 ft)
- Population (2023): 359
  - Density: 49.1/km^{2} (127/sq mi)
- Time zone: UTC+01:00 (CET)
  - Summer (DST): UTC+02:00 (CEST)
- INSEE/Postal code: 62804 /62810
- ^{1} French Land Register data, which excludes lakes, ponds, glaciers > 1 km^{2} (0.386 sq mi or 247 acres) and river estuaries.

Sus-Saint-Léger is a commune in the Pas-de-Calais department in the Hauts-de-France region of France.

== Geography ==
Sus-Saint-Léger lies 20 miles (32 km) southwest of Arras, at the junction of the D23 and D59 roads and on the border with the department of the Somme.

== Population ==
Historical population
Year	Pop.	±% p.a.
1968	425	—
1975	363	−2.23%
1982	340	−0.93%
1990	331	−0.33%
1999	292	−1.38%
2007	342	+2.00%
2012	354	+0.69%
2017	376	+1.21%
2023	359	−0.77%
Source: INSEE

== Places of interest ==
- The church of St.Leger, dating from the sixteenth century.
- The eighteenth-century chateau.
- A seventeenth-century manor house.
- Traces of a feudal motte

== See also ==
- Communes of the Pas-de-Calais department
