= Bailleulmont =

- Commune
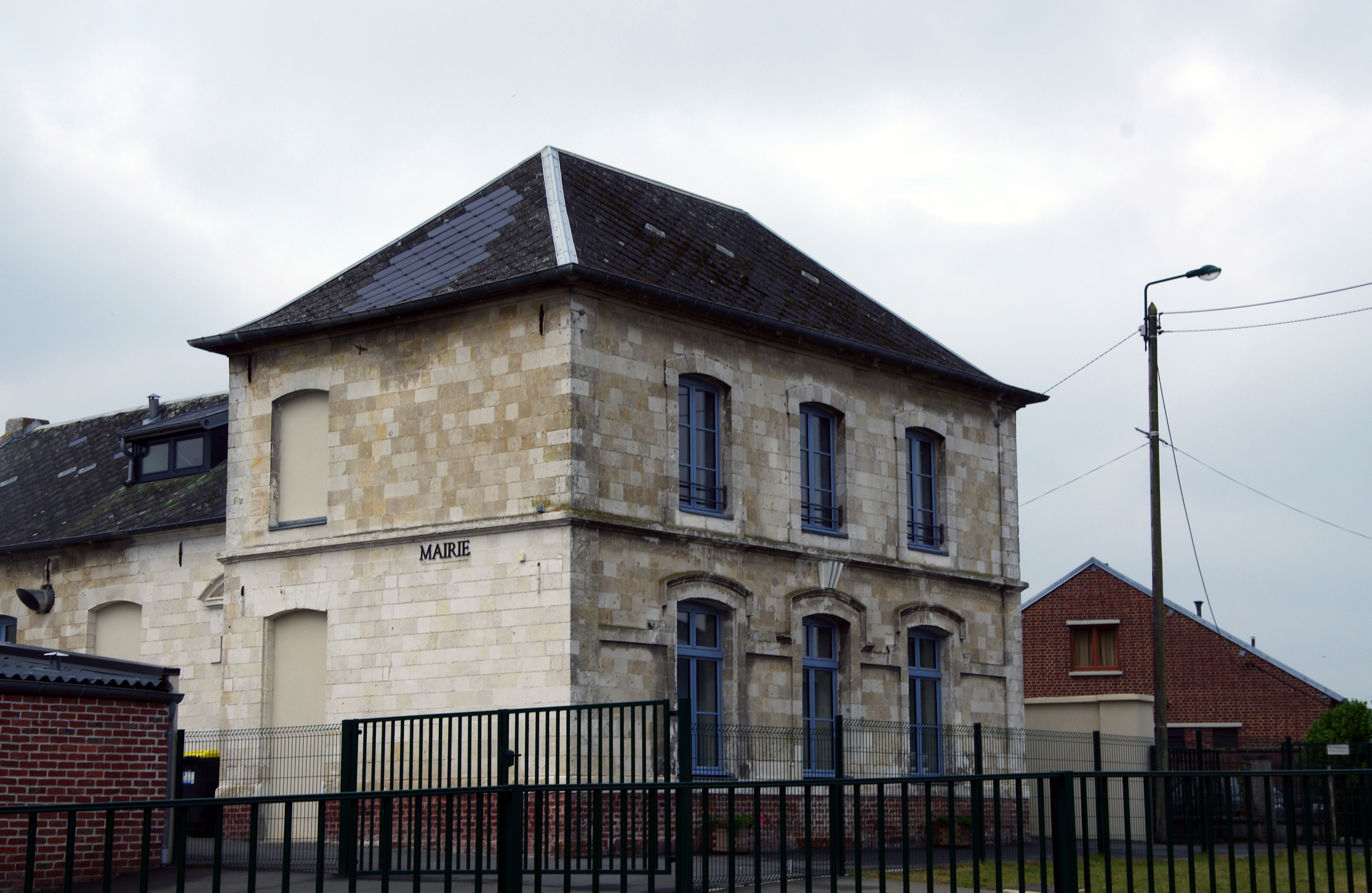
- The town hall of Bailleulmont

- Coat of arms
- Location of Bailleulmont
- Location within France Location within Hauts-de-France
- Coordinates: 50°12′56″N 2°36′51″E
- Country: France
- Region: Hauts-de-France
- Department: Pas-de-Calais
- Arrondissement: Arras
- Canton: Avesnes-le-Comte
- Intercommunality: CC Campagnes de l'Artois

Government
  - Mayor (2020–2026): Thomas Bonnelle
- Area^{1}: 5.41 km^{2} (2.09 sq mi)
- Elevation: 125 m (410 ft)
- Highest elevation: 158 m (518 ft)
- Lowest elevation: 106 m (348 ft)
- Population (2023): 213
  - Density: 39.4/km^{2} (102/sq mi)
- Time zone: UTC+01:00 (CET)
  - Summer (DST): UTC+02:00 (CEST)
- INSEE/Postal code: 62072 /62123
- ^{1} French Land Register data, which excludes lakes, ponds, glaciers > 1 km^{2} (0.386 sq mi or 247 acres) and river estuaries.

Bailleulmont (French pronunciation: [bajœlmɔ̃]) is a commune in the Pas-de-Calais department in the Hauts-de-France region of France.

== Geography ==
Bailleulmont is a farming village located 8 miles (13 km) southwest of Arras at the junction of the D1 and D66 roads.

== Population ==
Historical population
Year	Pop.	±% p.a.
1968	214	—
1975	214	+0.00%
1982	249	+2.19%
1990	282	+1.57%
1999	253	−1.20%
2007	242	−0.55%
2012	258	+1.29%
2017	240	−1.44%
2023	213	−1.97%
Source: INSEE

== Sights ==
- The church of St. Martin, dating from the eighteenth century.
- The ruined keep and motte of a 13th-century castle, inscribed as a monument historique by the French Ministry of Culture in 1947.

== See also ==
- Communes of the Pas-de-Calais department
