= Brie, Somme =

Brie
- Commune
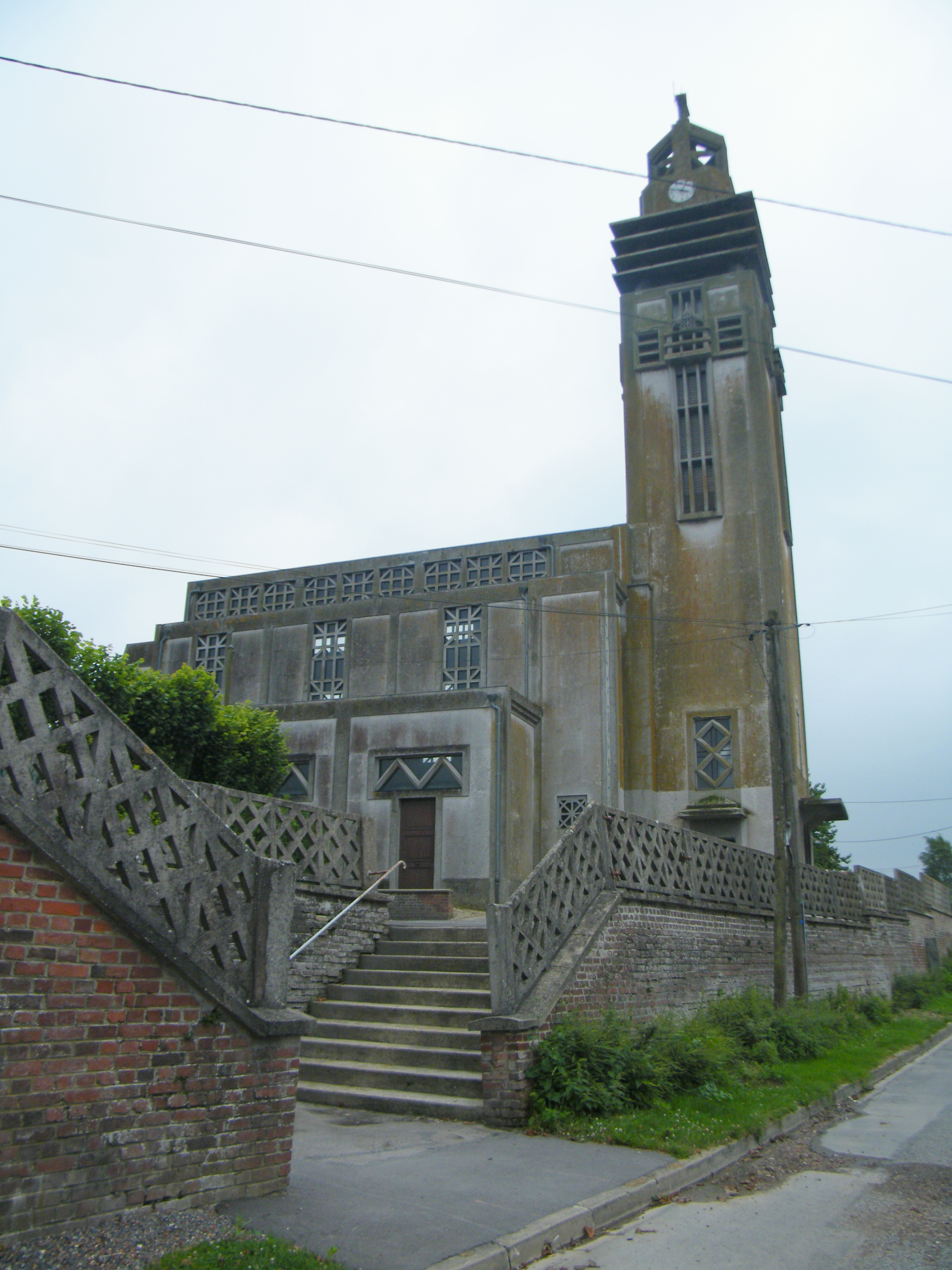
- The church in Brie

- Coat of arms
- Location of Brie
- Location within France Location within Hauts-de-France
- Coordinates: 49°52′33″N 2°55′56″E
- Country: France
- Region: Hauts-de-France
- Department: Somme
- Arrondissement: Péronne
- Canton: Péronne
- Intercommunality: Haute Somme

Government
  - Mayor (2020–2026): Marc Saintot
- Area^{1}: 6.89 km^{2} (2.66 sq mi)
- Elevation: 50 m (160 ft)
- Highest elevation: 87 m (285 ft)
- Lowest elevation: 47 m (154 ft)
- Population (2023): 350
  - Density: 51/km^{2} (130/sq mi)
- Time zone: UTC+01:00 (CET)
  - Summer (DST): UTC+02:00 (CEST)
- INSEE/Postal code: 80141 /80200
- ^{1} French Land Register data, which excludes lakes, ponds, glaciers > 1 km^{2} (0.386 sq mi or 247 acres) and river estuaries.

Brie (French pronunciation: [bʁi]) is a commune in the Somme department in Hauts-de-France in northern France.

== Geography ==
Brie is situated 16 miles (26 km) west of Saint-Quentin and about 10 kilometres (6.2 mi) south of Péronne, on the banks of the river Somme, where it is crossed by the N39.

=== Physical geography ===
The majority of the soil of the commune is of clay-limestone nature.1/5 of the subsoil is of limestone nature and 1/50 of the soil of sandy nature.

=== Relief, landscape, vegetation ===
The relief of the commune is that of a plateau, which culminates at 70 metres (230 ft) of altitude. The village built on the western slope of the plateau dominates the valley of the Somme and its lakes.

=== Hydrography ===
The river Somme touches the communal territory at its western extremity. On its entrance into the territory of Brie, the river divides into two arms, which meet soon after. The water table is located at a little distance from the level of the ponds.

=== Climate ===
The climate of the municipality is temperate oceanic with prevailing wind from southwest, northwest and west.

== Human geography ==
=== Urban planning and land use planning ===
The commune has a grouped habitat. The village of Brie was destroyed during the First World War was rebuilt during the interwar period.

=== Economic activity and services ===
Agriculture remains the dominant activity of the commune.

=== Roads of communication and transportation ===
Brie is crossed by the road Amiens-Saint-Quentin and the road that connects Saint-Christ-Briost to Mesnil-Bruntel.

== History ==
=== Toponymy ===
The name Brie comes from the Latin bria or the Celtic briga, which meant bridge over a river.

=== Ancient history ===
In front of the church, presence of prehistoric megalith "the turning stone".

=== Antiquity ===
Brie being situated on the Roman road from Samarobriva (Amiens) to Augusta Viromanduorum (Saint-Quentin) at the point where it crossed the Somme river, it is more than likely that there was a bridge there. Traces of Gallo-Roman habitat were found on the municipal territory.

=== Middle Ages ===
In the Middle Ages, Pont-lès-Brie and Applaincourt were dependencies of Brie. In 1303, by a charter, Gérin de Saint-Christ sold a wood near Brie in the priory of Lihons-en-Santerre. In 1344 a certain Jean de Brie was a maid of Péronne.

=== Coat of arms ===
Coat of arms of the village of Brie

The village coat of arms is "azure to the golden chevron accompanied by three half-flights of silver, those of the head back." The official status of the coat of arms remains to be determined.

=== Early Modern times ===
In 1571, the lordship of Brie belonged to the Duc de Chaulnes. In 1636, the village of Brie was burnt by a detachment of the armies of the king of Spain commanded by John of Werth. However, the revolted inhabitants armed themselves with pitchforks and scythes and rushed at the enemy, preventing them from passing the Somme and forcing them to fall back on Saint Christ. 34 inhabitants of Brie perished in this scuffle. On a map of Guillaume Delisle, dating from the 18th century, there is a fort defending the west entrance of the bridge. Brie depended on the election and bailiwick of Péronne, the generality of Amiens and the diocese of Noyon.

During the French Revolution, the hamlets of Pont-lès-Brie and Applaincourt were attached to the commune of Villers-Carbonnel.

In 1814–1815, the coalition armies ravaged the country.

In 1870–1871, the population of Brie underwent the requisitions of the German army, in money and in kind. 24 young people of the commune took part in the fighting, two were wounded.

=== Modern history ===
During the First World War, the village of Brie was destroyed.

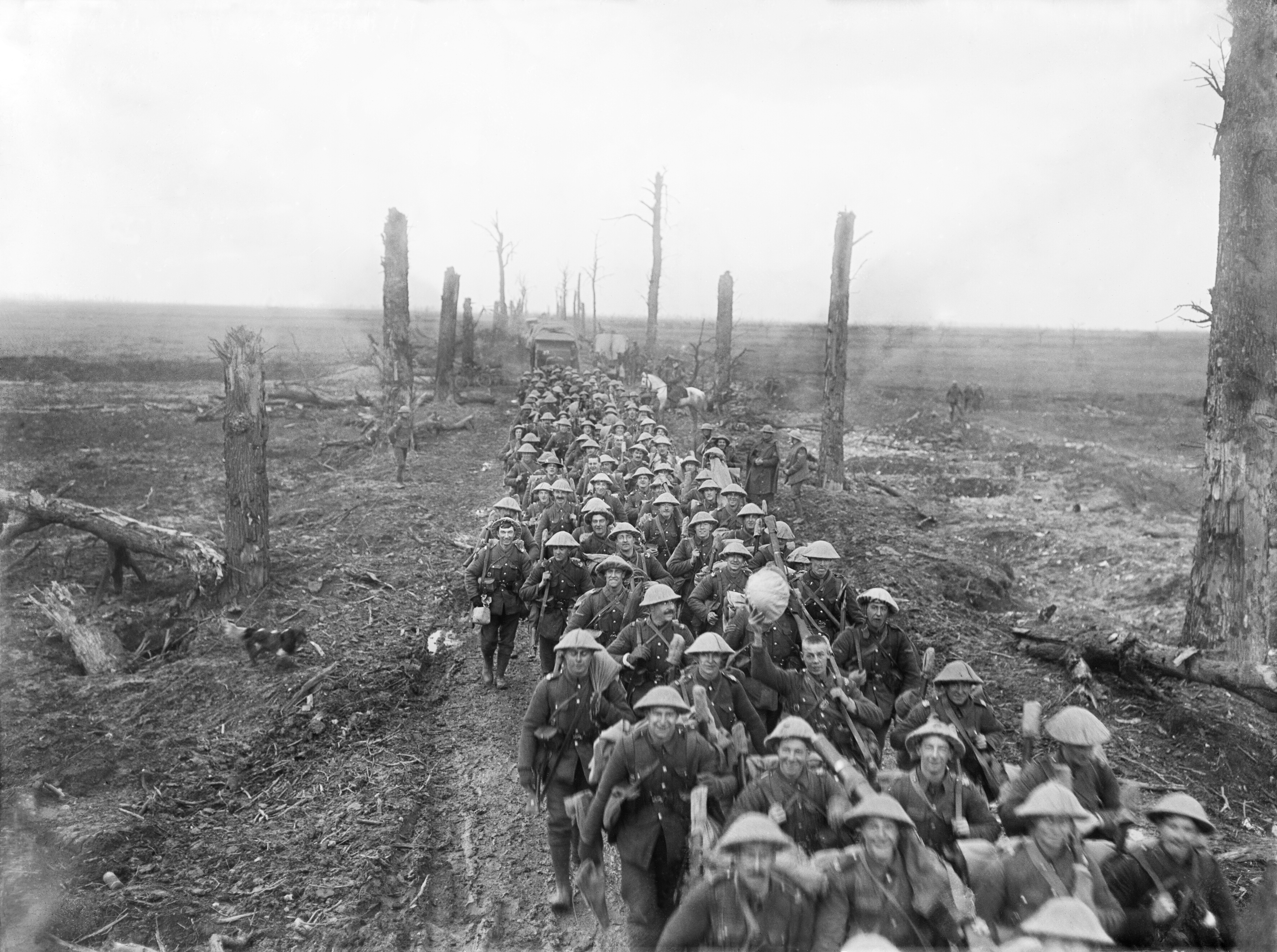
Sherwood Foresters following up Germans near Brie March

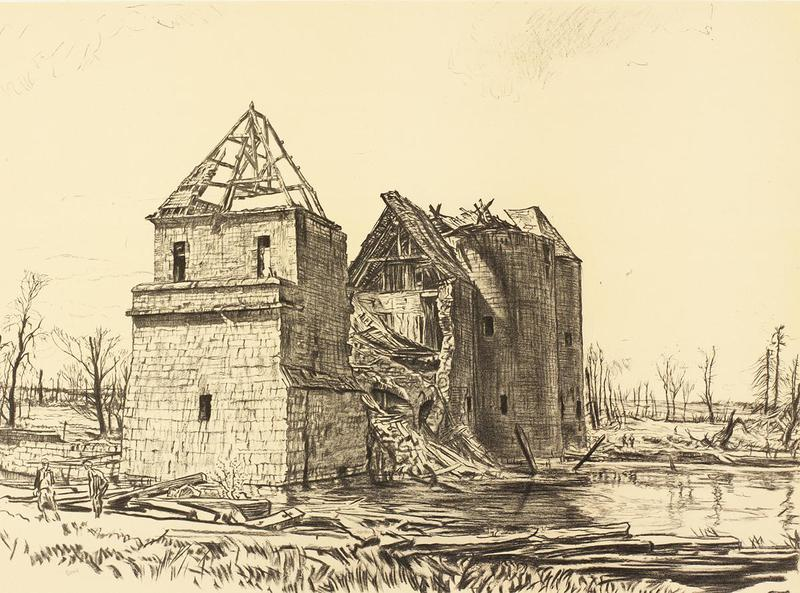

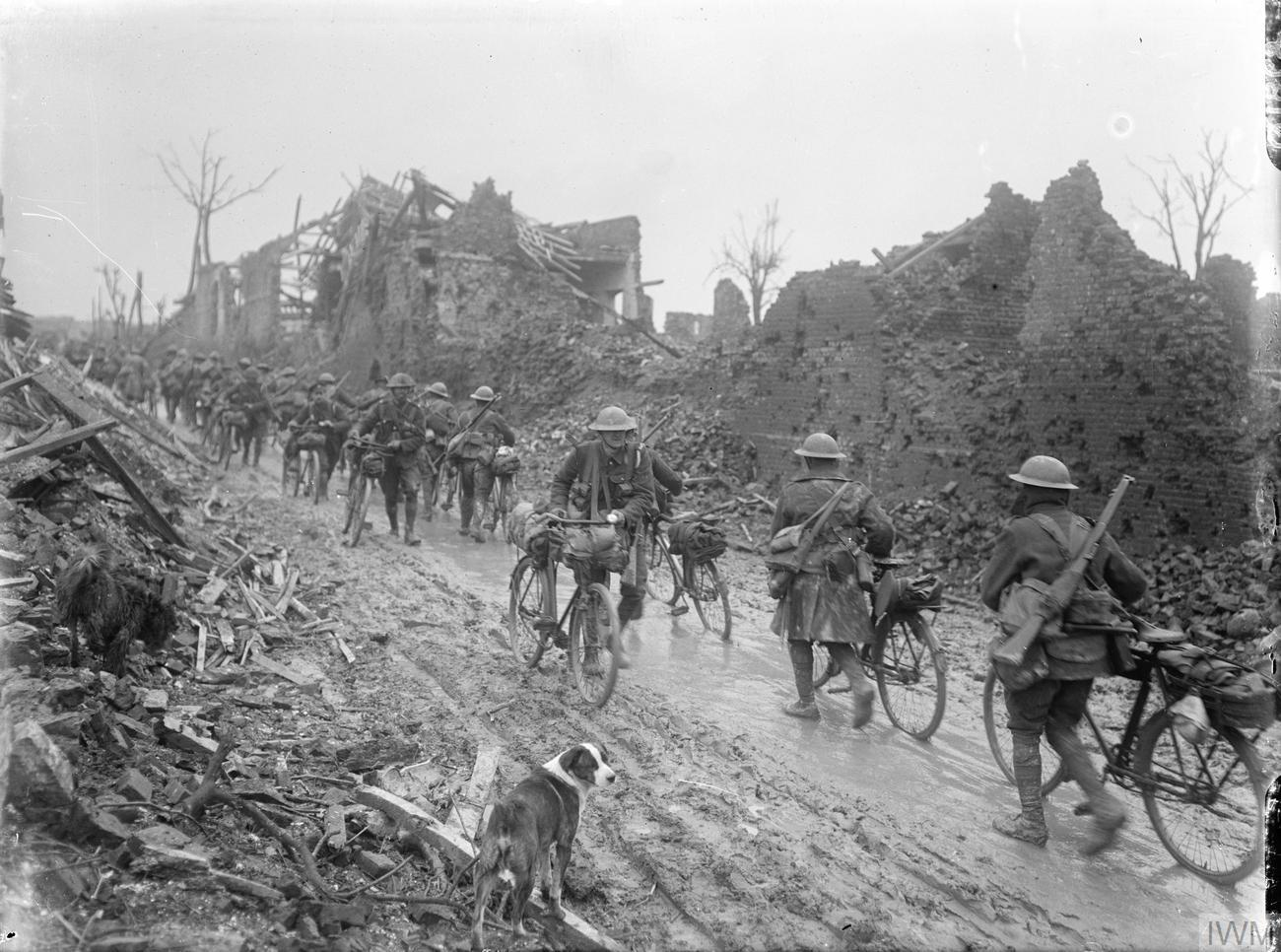
British bicycle troops Brie, Somme March 1917

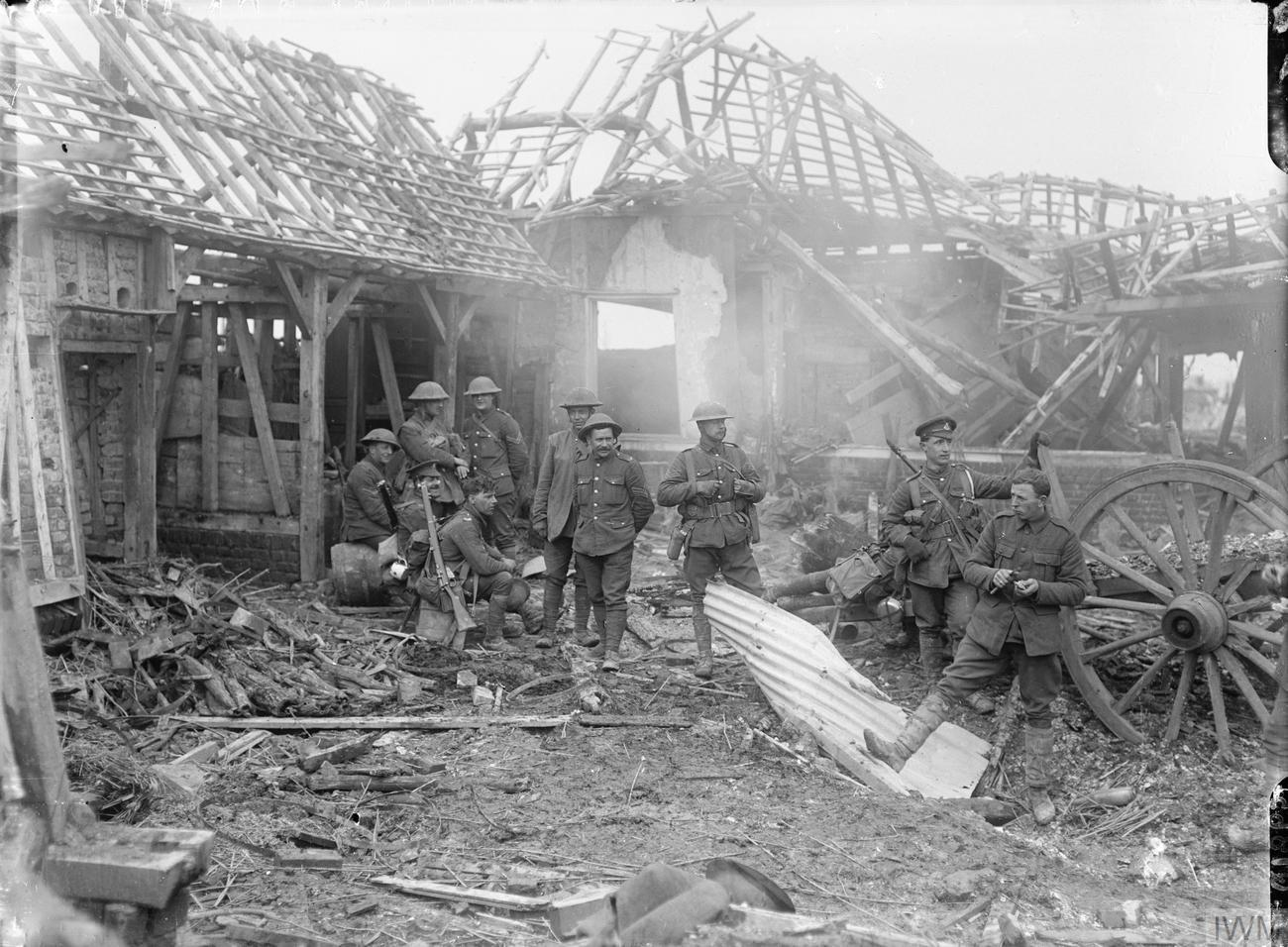
British troops in Brie, Somme March 1917

== Politics ==
The mayor is Marc Saintot, elected in 2020.

== Population ==
Historical population
Year	Pop.	±% p.a.
1968	319	—
1975	299	−0.92%
1982	310	+0.52%
1990	307	−0.12%
1999	301	−0.22%
2007	325	+0.96%
2012	341	+0.97%
2017	331	−0.59%
2023	350	+0.93%
Source: INSEE

== See also ==
- Communes of the Somme department
