= Sorel, Somme =

Sorel
- Commune
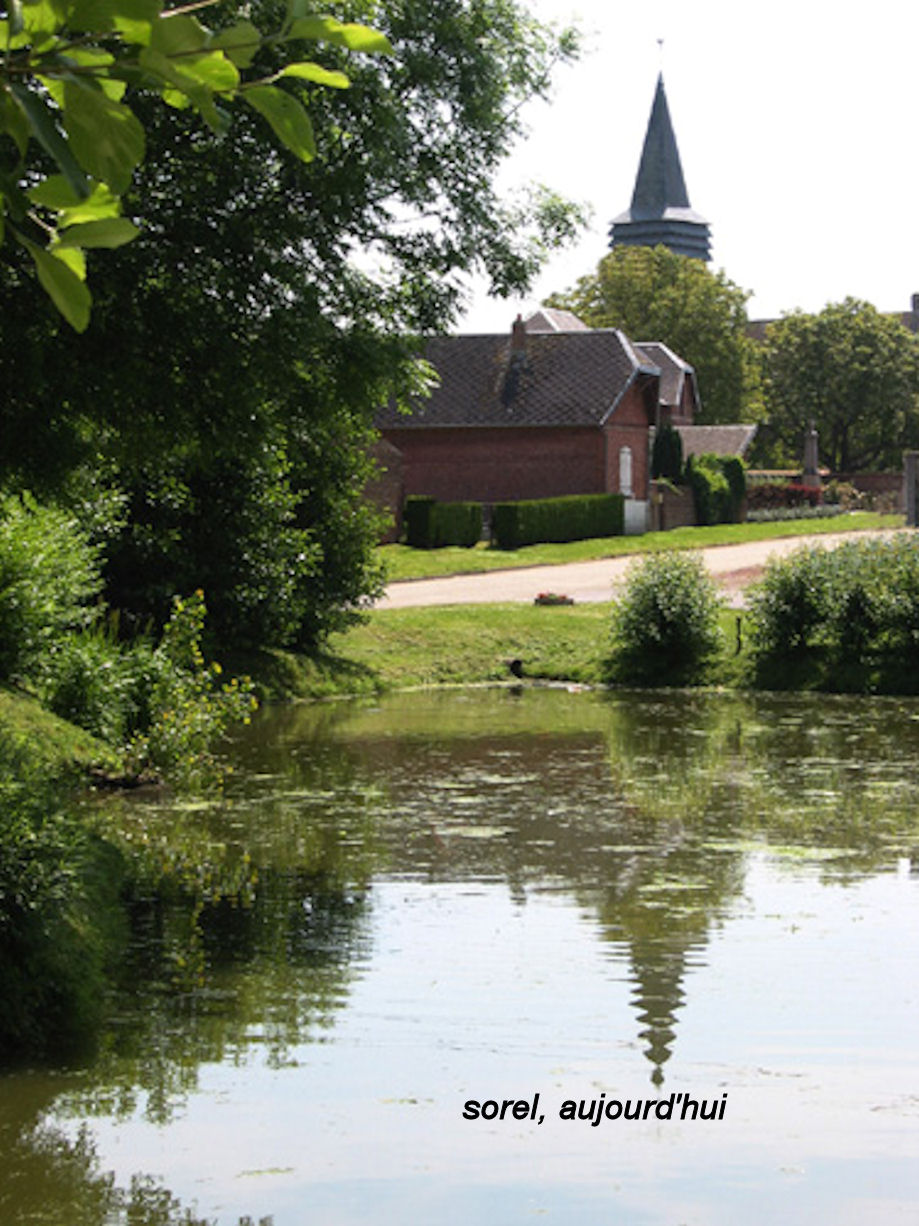
- The church and lake in Sorel

- Coat of arms
- Location of Sorel
- Location within France Location within Hauts-de-France
- Coordinates: 50°01′27″N 3°03′03″E
- Country: France
- Region: Hauts-de-France
- Department: Somme
- Arrondissement: Péronne
- Canton: Péronne
- Intercommunality: Haute Somme

Government
  - Mayor (2020–2026): Jacques Decaux
- Area^{1}: 7.94 km^{2} (3.07 sq mi)
- Elevation: 40 m (130 ft)
- Highest elevation: 148 m (486 ft)
- Lowest elevation: 99 m (325 ft)
- Population (2023): 162
  - Density: 20.4/km^{2} (52.8/sq mi)
- Time zone: UTC+01:00 (CET)
  - Summer (DST): UTC+02:00 (CEST)
- INSEE/Postal code: 80737 /80240
- ^{1} French Land Register data, which excludes lakes, ponds, glaciers > 1 km^{2} (0.386 sq mi or 247 acres) and river estuaries.

Sorel (French pronunciation: [sɔʁɛl]) is a commune in the Somme department in Hauts-de-France in northern France.

== Geography ==
Sorel is situated 11 miles (18 km) southwest of Cambrai, on the D222 road, only a couple of miles from the border with the Pas-de-Calais department.

== Population ==
Historical population
Year	Pop.	±% p.a.
1968	223	—
1975	197	−1.76%
1982	184	−0.97%
1990	187	+0.20%
1999	163	−1.51%
2007	166	+0.23%
2012	170	+0.48%
2017	162	−0.96%
2023	162	+0.00%
Source: INSEE

== History ==
The village was completely rebuilt after the devastation wrought by World War I. During the 1920s, architect Louis Faille, originally from Nurlu, was responsible for the reconstruction, notably the ‘mairie-école’ (combined mayor's office and school) and the church, completed in 1932.

== See also ==
- Communes of the Somme department
