= Aizecourt =

Aizecourt may refer to:

- Aizecourt-le-Bas, a commune in the Somme department in Hauts-de-France in northern France.
- Aizecourt-le-Haut, a commune in the Somme department in Hauts-de-France in northern France.
