= Villers-Faucon =

- Commune
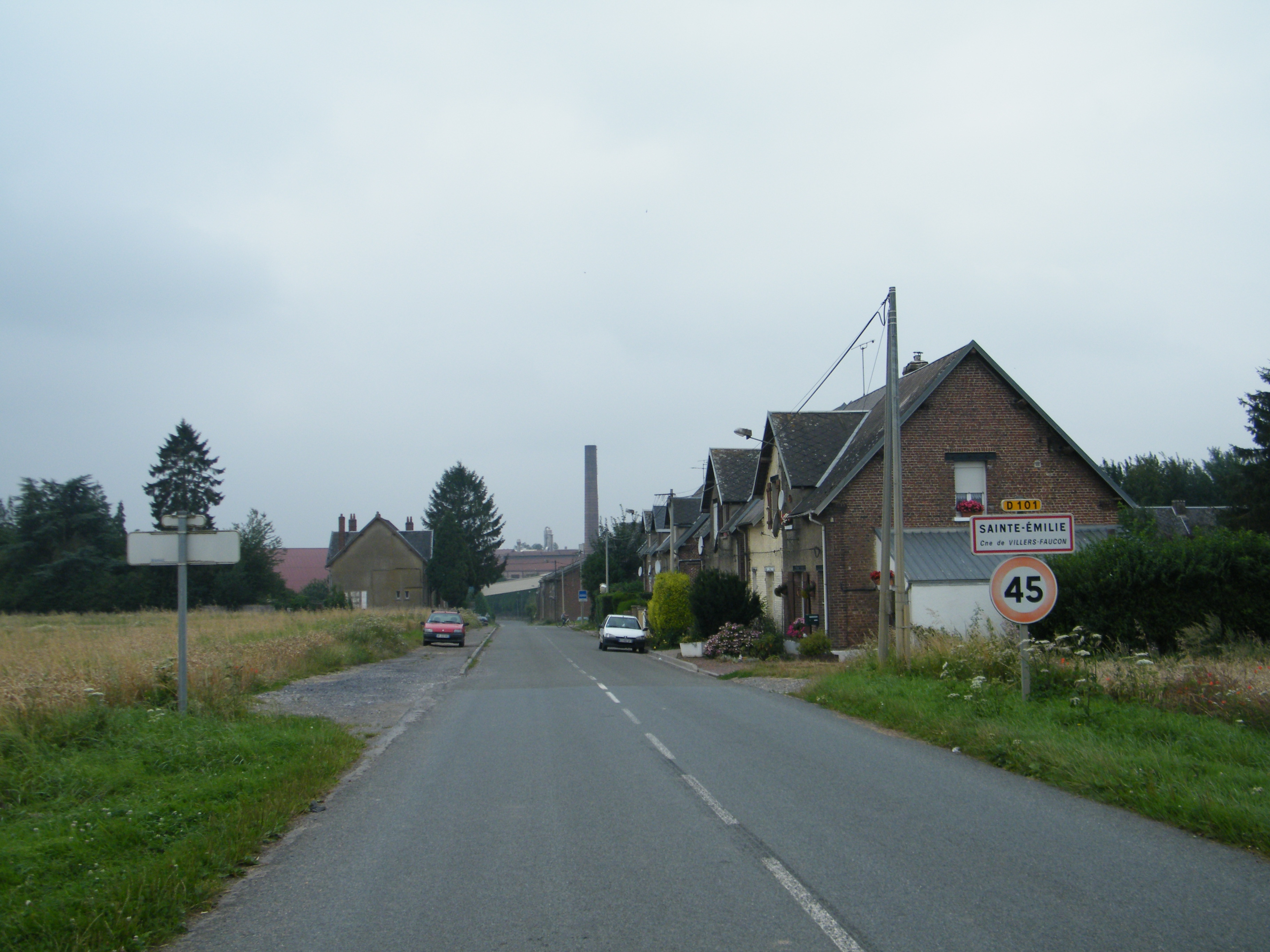
- The road into Sainte-Emilie

- Coat of arms
- Location of Villers-Faucon
- Location within France Location within Hauts-de-France
- Coordinates: 49°58′39″N 3°06′00″E
- Country: France
- Region: Hauts-de-France
- Department: Somme
- Arrondissement: Péronne
- Canton: Péronne
- Intercommunality: Haute Somme

Government
  - Mayor (2020–2026): Séverine Mordacq
- Area^{1}: 11.42 km^{2} (4.41 sq mi)
- Elevation: 104 m (341 ft)
- Highest elevation: 144 m (472 ft)
- Lowest elevation: 75 m (246 ft)
- Population (2023): 530
  - Density: 46/km^{2} (120/sq mi)
- Time zone: UTC+01:00 (CET)
  - Summer (DST): UTC+02:00 (CEST)
- INSEE/Postal code: 80802 /80240
- ^{1} French Land Register data, which excludes lakes, ponds, glaciers > 1 km^{2} (0.386 sq mi or 247 acres) and river estuaries.

Villers-Faucon (French pronunciation: [vilɛʁ fokɔ̃]) is a commune in the Somme department in Hauts-de-France in northern France.

== Geography ==
The commune is situated 15 miles (24 km) northwest of Saint-Quentin, at the D72 and D101 crossroads, in the far east of the département. The commune also includes the hamlet of Sainte-Emilie.

== Population ==
Historical population
Year	Pop.	±% p.a.
1968	916	—
1975	803	−1.86%
1982	704	−1.86%
1990	662	−0.77%
1999	625	−0.64%
2007	660	+0.68%
2012	649	−0.34%
2017	588	−1.95%
2023	530	−1.72%
Source: INSEE

== History ==
According to Abbot Decagny of Roisel, Villers-Faucon was originally Villers-Falcon and previously Villare Falconis, which means, in Latin, villa of the hawks. Villers-Faucon's original purpose was that of a falconry, located in the heart of the forest of Arrouaise.
The village was almost totally destroyed in 1916, during the First World War. Following a withdrawal of German troops around the Hindenburg line, the inhabitants were evacuated to the north to Denain, tons of dynamite were set off around all of the buildings in the town (including the sugar refinery at St. Emilie) and all the trees were cut down, to leave the field open for the approach of troops. The village was destroyed, but the cemetery was left untouched.
After the conflict, reconstruction began, which lasted almost a decade, led by a rebuilding cooperative led by Louis Faille.

== Sites and monuments ==
- Notre Dame church was rebuilt in 1932 by architect Louis Faille. It's one of many public buildings completed by the architect in his work during the period of reconstruction of the eastern part of the Somme.

== Notable resident ==
Villers-Faucon is the birthplace of:

- Hélène Nautré (1904–1976), French resistance fighter and politician.

== See also ==
- Communes of the Somme department
