= Éterpigny =

Éterpigny is the name of two communes in France:

- Éterpigny, Pas-de-Calais
- Éterpigny, Somme
