= Bussu =

Bussu is the name of two communities, one in Hungary, one in France:

- Büssü, in Hungary
- Bussu, in the Somme department
