= D'Urban Armstrong =

South African flying ace

- Born: D'Urban Victor Armstrong; 26 July 1897; Colony of Natal
- Died: 13 November 1918 (aged 21); Near Bouvincourt-en-Vermandois, France
- Burial place: Tincourt, New British Cemetery, East of Peromme
- Military career
- Allegiance: United Kingdom; Union of South Africa
- Branch: Royal Flying Corps
- Service years: ca 1915 - 1918
- Rank: Captain
- Units: No. 60 Squadron RFC; No. 44 Squadron RFC; No. 78 Squadron RFC; No. 151 Squadron RAF
- Awards: Distinguished Flying Cross

Captain D'Urban Victor Armstrong DFC (26 July 1897 – 13 November 1918) was a South African World War I flying ace credited with five aerial victories.

Born in the Colony of Natal on 26 July 1897, and educated at Hilton College, Armstrong joined the Royal Flying Corps in 1915. He was assigned to No. 60 Squadron the following year; while with them, he scored a kill on 9 November 1916. His next posting was to No. 44 Squadron on home defense duties. In 1917, he was transferred to No. 78 Squadron to lead a flight. His final assignment was with No. 151 Squadron.

He was one of the first night fighter victors in aerial warfare, as 151 Squadron was the Royal Air Force's first night fighter squadron, 151 Squadron. Armstrong was credited with four nighttime victories between 29 June and 17 September 1918, including a Gotha G bomber on 24 August near Bouvincourt-en-Vermandois, France. Two days after war's end, Armstrong was killed in a flying accident while flying aerobatics in his Sopwith Camel.
