= Bouchavesnes-Bergen =

- Commune
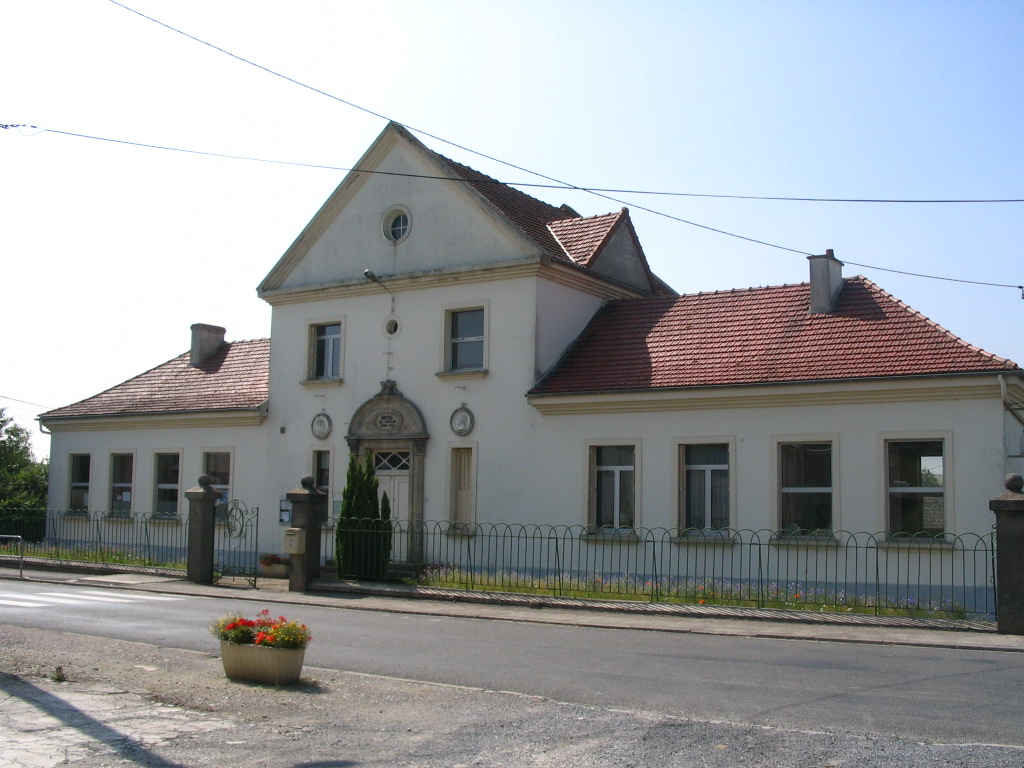
- The town hall of Bouchavesnes-Bergen

- Coat of arms
- Location of Bouchavesnes-Bergen
- Location within France Location within Hauts-de-France
- Coordinates: 49°59′09″N 2°55′19″E
- Country: France
- Region: Hauts-de-France
- Department: Somme
- Arrondissement: Péronne
- Canton: Péronne
- Intercommunality: Haute Somme

Government
  - Mayor (2020–2026): Régis Gourdin
- Area^{1}: 10.09 km^{2} (3.90 sq mi)
- Elevation: 130 m (430 ft)
- Highest elevation: 152 m (499 ft)
- Lowest elevation: 79 m (259 ft)
- Population (2023): 283
  - Density: 28.0/km^{2} (72.6/sq mi)
- Time zone: UTC+01:00 (CET)
  - Summer (DST): UTC+02:00 (CEST)
- INSEE/Postal code: 80115 /80200
- ^{1} French Land Register data, which excludes lakes, ponds, glaciers > 1 km^{2} (0.386 sq mi or 247 acres) and river estuaries.

Bouchavesnes-Bergen (French pronunciation: [buʃavɛn bɛʁɡɛn]; Picard: Bouchavène-Bergen) is a commune in the Somme department in Hauts-de-France in northern France.

== Geography ==
The commune is situated on the junction of the D149 and the N17 roads, some 22 miles (35 km) northwest of Saint-Quentin.

== Population ==
Historical population
Year	Pop.	±% p.a.
1968	239	—
1975	225	−0.86%
1982	277	+3.01%
1990	359	+3.29%
1999	326	−1.07%
2007	327	+0.04%
2012	341	+0.84%
2017	291	−3.12%
2023	283	−0.46%
Source: INSEE

== Foch Monument ==
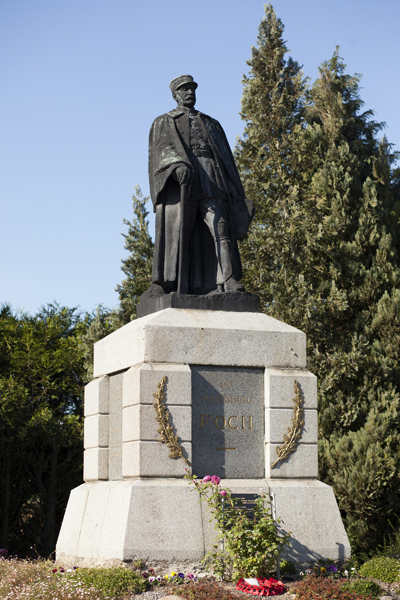
PM_113178_F_Bouchavesnes_Bergen

The town has a monument dedicated to Marshal Foch. This is located near the D1017 road. This monument represents a bronze statue of Marshal Foch sculpted by Firmin Michelet, a French sculpor. It was inaugurated in 1926 in the presence of Marshal Foch.

== See also ==
- Communes of the Somme department
