= Cartigny, Somme =

Cartigny
- Commune
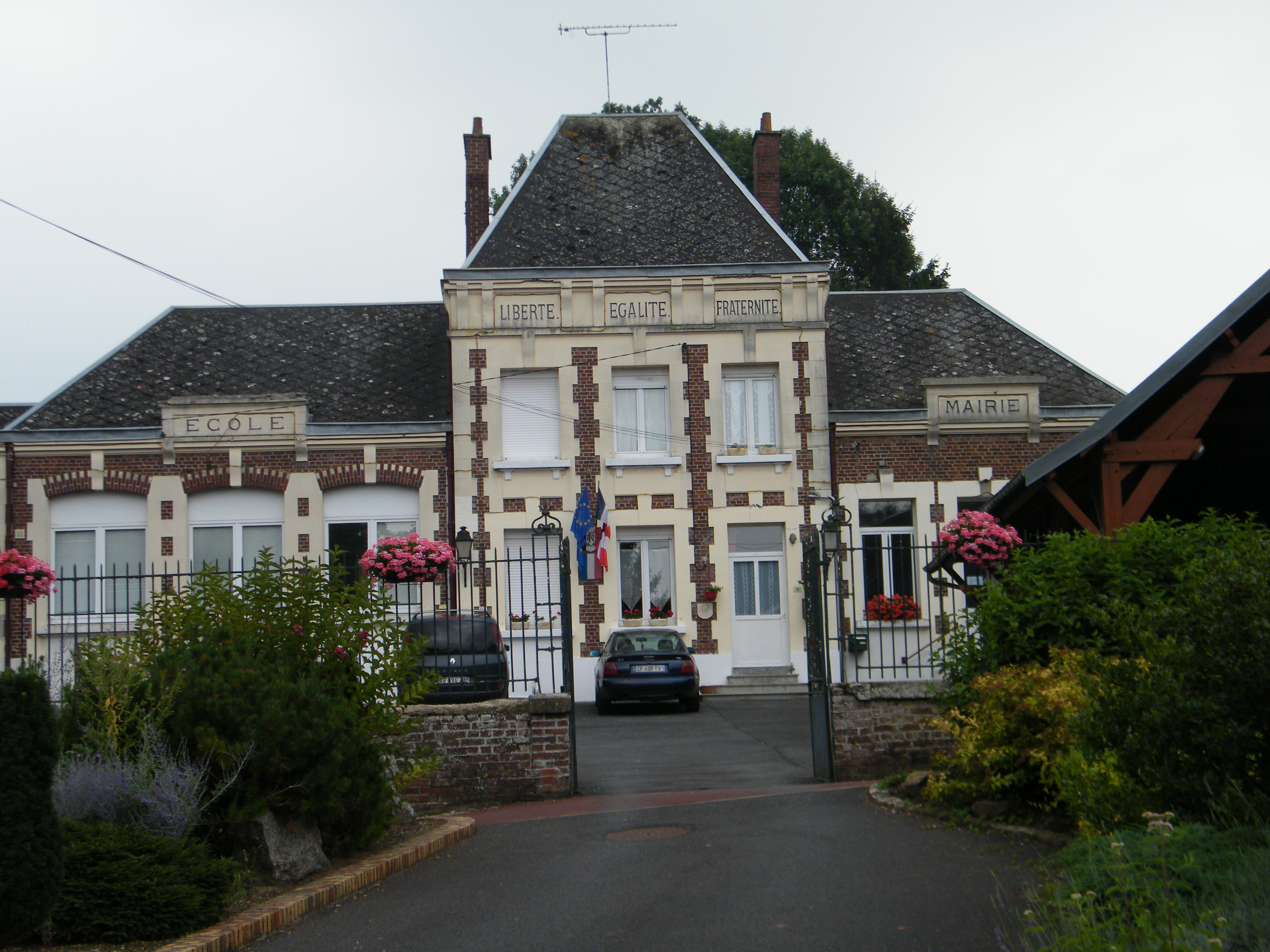
- The town hall and school in Cartigny
- Location of Cartigny
- Location within France Location within Hauts-de-France
- Coordinates: 49°54′53″N 3°00′38″E
- Country: France
- Region: Hauts-de-France
- Department: Somme
- Arrondissement: Péronne
- Canton: Péronne
- Intercommunality: Haute Somme

Government
  - Mayor (2024–2026): Patrick Devaux
- Area^{1}: 15.15 km^{2} (5.85 sq mi)
- Elevation: 60 m (200 ft)
- Highest elevation: 107 m (351 ft)
- Lowest elevation: 55 m (180 ft)
- Population (2023): 688
  - Density: 45.4/km^{2} (118/sq mi)
- Time zone: UTC+01:00 (CET)
  - Summer (DST): UTC+02:00 (CEST)
- INSEE/Postal code: 80177 /80200
- ^{1} French Land Register data, which excludes lakes, ponds, glaciers > 1 km^{2} (0.386 sq mi or 247 acres) and river estuaries.

Cartigny (French pronunciation: [kaʁtiɲi]; Picard: Quèrtgny) is a commune in the Somme department in Hauts-de-France in northern France.

== Geography ==
Cartigny is situated on the D194 road, some 56 kilometres (35 mi) east-northeast of Amiens.

== Population ==
Historical population
Year	Pop.	±% p.a.
1968	750	—
1975	659	−1.83%
1982	804	+2.88%
1990	770	−0.54%
1999	701	−1.04%
2007	659	−0.77%
2012	742	+2.40%
2017	745	+0.08%
2023	688	−1.32%
Source: INSEE

== See also ==
- Communes of the Somme department
