= Canton of Péronne =

Coordinates: 49°55′59″N 2°56′14″E

Péronne
- Canton
- Interactive map of Péronne
- Country: France
- Region: Hauts-de-France
- Department: Somme
- No. of communes: {{{nbcomm}}}
- Area: 462.83 km^{2} (178.70 sq mi)
- Population (2023): 26,393
  - Density: 57.025/km^{2} (147.69/sq mi)
- INSEE code: 80 20

The Canton of Péronne is a canton situated in the department of the Somme and in the Hauts-de-France region of northern France.

== Geography ==
The canton is organised around the commune of Péronne, in the arrondissement of Péronne.

== Composition ==
At the French canton reorganisation which came into effect in March 2015, the canton was expanded from 21 to 60 communes:

- Aizecourt-le-Bas
- Aizecourt-le-Haut
- Allaines
- Barleux
- Bernes
- Biaches
- Bouchavesnes-Bergen
- Bouvincourt-en-Vermandois
- Brie
- Buire-Courcelles
- Bussu
- Cartigny
- Cléry-sur-Somme
- Combles
- Devise
- Doingt
- Driencourt
- Épehy
- Équancourt
- Estrées-Mons
- Éterpigny
- Étricourt-Manancourt
- Feuillères
- Fins
- Flaucourt
- Flers
- Ginchy
- Gueudecourt
- Guillemont
- Guyencourt-Saulcourt
- Hancourt
- Hardecourt-aux-Bois
- Hem-Monacu
- Hervilly
- Herbécourt
- Hesbécourt
- Heudicourt
- Lesbœufs
- Liéramont
- Longavesnes
- Longueval
- Marquaix
- Maurepas
- Mesnil-Bruntel
- Mesnil-en-Arrouaise
- Moislains
- Nurlu
- Péronne
- Pœuilly
- Rancourt
- Roisel
- Ronssoy
- Sailly-Saillisel
- Sorel
- Templeux-la-Fosse
- Templeux-le-Guérard
- Tincourt-Boucly
- Villers-Carbonnel
- Villers-Faucon
- Vraignes-en-Vermandois

Before 2015, the composition was as follows:

- Aizecourt-le-Haut
- Allaines
- Barleux
- Biaches
- Bouchavesnes-Bergen
- Bouvincourt-en-Vermandois
- Brie
- Buire-Courcelles
- Bussu
- Cartigny
- Cléry-sur-Somme
- Doingt
- Estrées-Mons
- Éterpigny
- Feuillères
- Flaucourt
- Mesnil-Bruntel
- Moislains
- Nurlu
- Péronne
- Villers-Carbonnel

== Population ==
Historical population
Year	Pop.	±% p.a.
2013	27,913	—
2018	27,253	−0.48%
Source: INSEE

== See also ==
- Arrondissements of the Somme department
- Cantons of the Somme department
- Communes of the Somme department
