= Buire-Courcelles =

- Commune
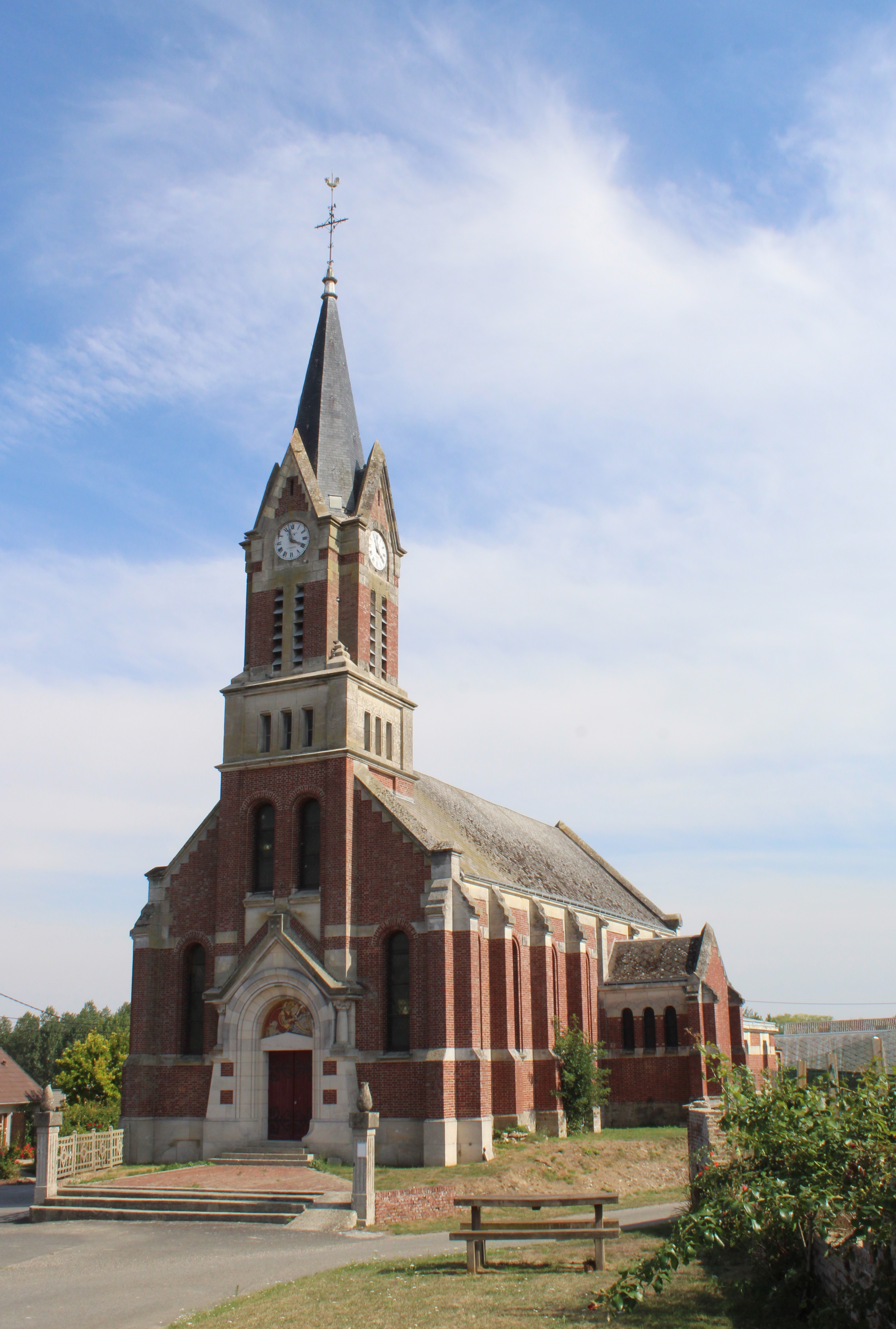
- The church in Buire-Courcelles
- Location of Buire-Courcelles
- Location within France Location within Hauts-de-France
- Coordinates: 49°55′40″N 3°00′55″E
- Country: France
- Region: Hauts-de-France
- Department: Somme
- Arrondissement: Péronne
- Canton: Péronne
- Intercommunality: Haute Somme

Government
  - Mayor (2020–2026): David Hé
- Area^{1}: 7.76 km^{2} (3.00 sq mi)
- Elevation: 50 m (160 ft)
- Highest elevation: 133 m (436 ft)
- Lowest elevation: 56 m (184 ft)
- Population (2023): 220
  - Density: 28/km^{2} (73/sq mi)
- Time zone: UTC+01:00 (CET)
  - Summer (DST): UTC+02:00 (CEST)
- INSEE/Postal code: 80150 /80200
- ^{1} French Land Register data, which excludes lakes, ponds, glaciers > 1 km^{2} (0.386 sq mi or 247 acres) and river estuaries.

Buire-Courcelles (French pronunciation: [bɥiʁ kuʁsɛl]; Picard: Buire-Courchelle) is a commune in the Somme department in Hauts-de-France in northern France.

== Geography ==
The commune is situated on the D199 road, some 14 miles (23 km) northeast of Saint-Quentin.

== Etymology ==
- Buire : Of Celtic origin, meaning 'a slope', Buire has been successively Buracum and Buiciera.
- Courcelles Also of Celtic origin, meaning a group of houses. This hamlet was a commune before the French Revolution and attached to Buire in 1794.

== Population ==
Historical population
Year	Pop.	±% p.a.
1968	302	—
1975	316	+0.65%
1982	291	−1.17%
1990	283	−0.35%
1999	284	+0.04%
2007	257	−1.24%
2012	242	−1.20%
2017	234	−0.67%
2023	220	−1.02%
Source: INSEE

== See also ==
- Communes of the Somme department
