= Louis Faille =

French architect

Louis-Michel-Clément Faille (1881, Nurlu – 1938, Nurlu) was a French architect from Picardie. He was responsible for much reconstruction in the eastern Somme department of northern France after the end of World War I.

== Career ==
Faille was interested in the local architectural tradition. In 1917, he took part in a competition launched by S.A.D.G.( Société des architectes diplômés par le gouvernement ) for the establishment of typical models of homes and farms for the devastated Somme region. His idea was of a large Picardy farm at the heart of a commune. In the days following the end of the World War I, in accord with the territorial divisions allotted for reconstruction, he was assigned to the cantons of Roisel and Combles, where he designed and built many new schools, churches and town-halls.

== Major works ==
- Sorel-le-Grand; Mairie-school, Church (1932)
- Longavesnes; Church (1926)
- Moislains; Church (1928-1932)
- Roisel; Church
- Nurlu; Marie-school, Church, his personal home
- Étricourt-Manancourt; Church
- Villers-Faucon; Church and also chief architect for the reconstruction cooperative
- Péronne (Somme); War memorial
- Guyencourt-Saulcourt; Church and two chapels
