= Hélène Nautré =

French woman resistance fighter and politician

Hélène Laetitia Marie Nautré, born on 15 March 1904 in Villers-Faucon and died on 26 October 1976 in Reims, was a French resistance fighter and politician.

== Biography ==
Daughter of Paul Gorguet and Marie Olivier, Hélène Gorguet was born into a working-class family. She attended primary school and worked as a cleaner and then as a cloakroom employee in Reims. Married in 1922 in Reims to André Nautré, she joined the French Communist Party in September 1929 and was secretary of the Reims section of the World Women's Committee.

Involved in the communist resistance during the World War II, she was in charge of collecting funds, distributing material and acting as a liaison officer. She was arrested by the Germans in May 1943, then deported in May 1944 to Ravensbrück, before being transferred to Belsen, then Hanover.

Liberated in June 1945, she returned to Reims and continued to be active in the French Communist Party. She became the departmental secretary of the Union of French Women, was elected as a municipal councillor in Reims (at the same time as her husband, André, also a communist) and came third on the communist list in the Marne for the election of the second constituency, then in the 1946 legislative elections.

After the successive resignations of Alcide Benoît, then Yves Angeletti, she became a member of parliament from June 1948 to July 1951.

Still the departmental secretary of the Union of French Women in 1953, she sat with her husband André and her son, Marcel, on the federal communist committee. Her name disappeared from this committee after that date.

== Distinctions ==
- Chevalier of the Legion of Honour
- Médaille militaire
- Croix de guerre 1939-1945 with palm
- Cross of the Resistance Volunteer Combatant
- Combatant's Cross 1939-1945
- 1939–1945 Commemorative war medal

== Legacy ==
- A street and a park are named after her in Reims.49.268085°N 4.07524°E
