= Allaines =

Commune in Hauts-de-France, France

- Commune
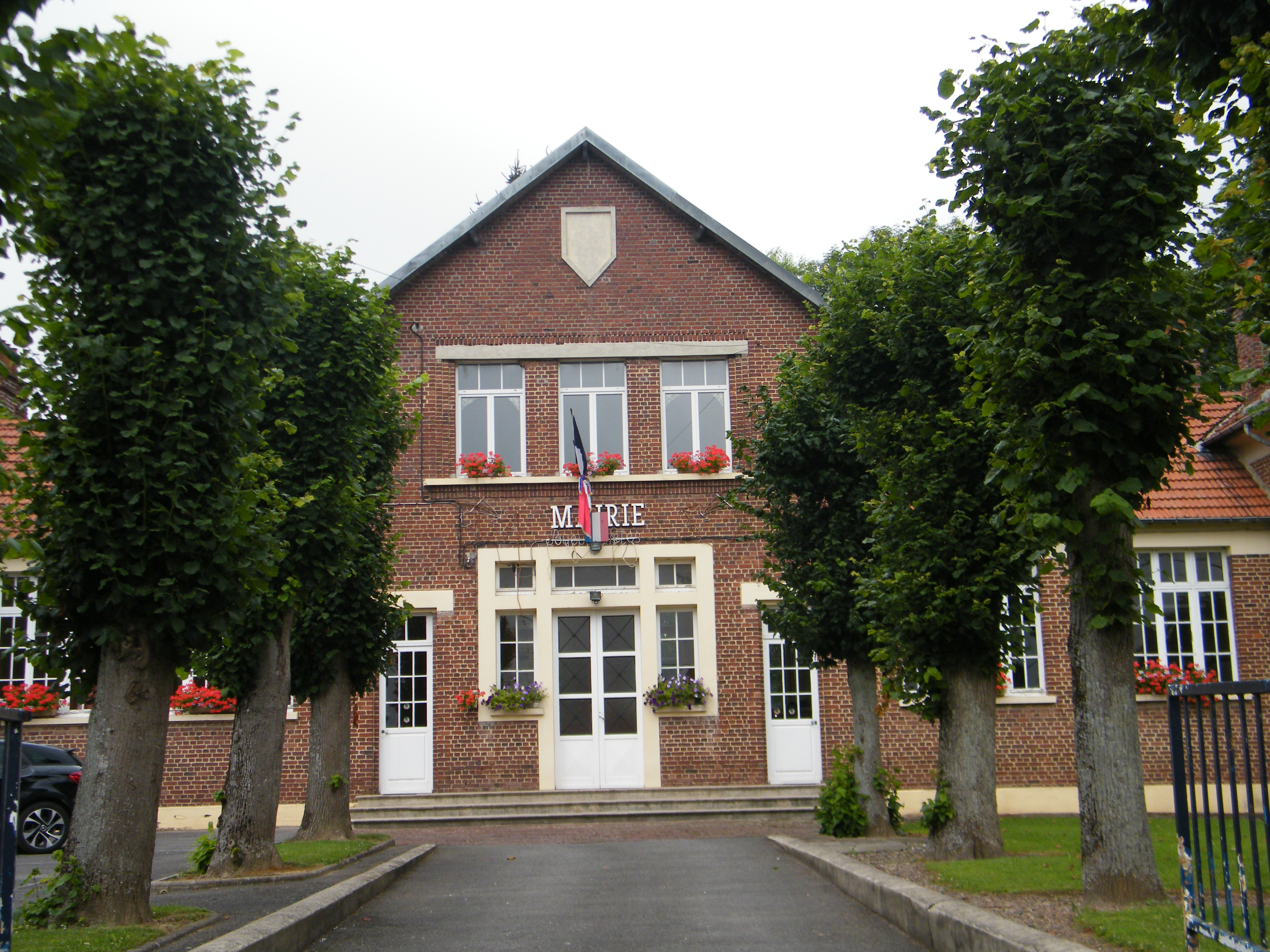
- The town hall of Allaines
- Location of Allaines
- Location within France Location within Hauts-de-France
- Coordinates: 49°57′45″N 2°56′44″E
- Country: France
- Region: Hauts-de-France
- Department: Somme
- Arrondissement: Péronne
- Canton: Péronne
- Intercommunality: Haute Somme

Government
  - Mayor (2020–2026): Françoise Grimaux
- Area^{1}: 8.36 km^{2} (3.23 sq mi)
- Elevation: 67 m (220 ft)
- Highest elevation: 136 m (446 ft)
- Lowest elevation: 47 m (154 ft)
- Population (2023): 419
  - Density: 50.1/km^{2} (130/sq mi)
- Time zone: UTC+01:00 (CET)
  - Summer (DST): UTC+02:00 (CEST)
- INSEE/Postal code: 80017 /80200
- ^{1} French Land Register data, which excludes lakes, ponds, glaciers > 1 km^{2} (0.386 sq mi or 247 acres) and river estuaries.

Allaines (French pronunciation: [alɛn]) is a commune in the Somme department in Hauts-de-France in northern France.

== Geography ==
The commune is on the D43 departmental road about 34 km (21 mi) northeast of Saint-Quentin.

== Population ==
Historical population
Year	Pop.	±% p.a.
1968	376	—
1975	375	−0.04%
1982	465	+3.12%
1990	429	−1.00%
1999	395	−0.91%
2007	435	+1.21%
2012	416	−0.89%
2017	466	+2.30%
2023	419	−1.76%
Source: INSEE

== See also ==
- Communes of the Somme department
