= Cléry-sur-Somme =

- Commune
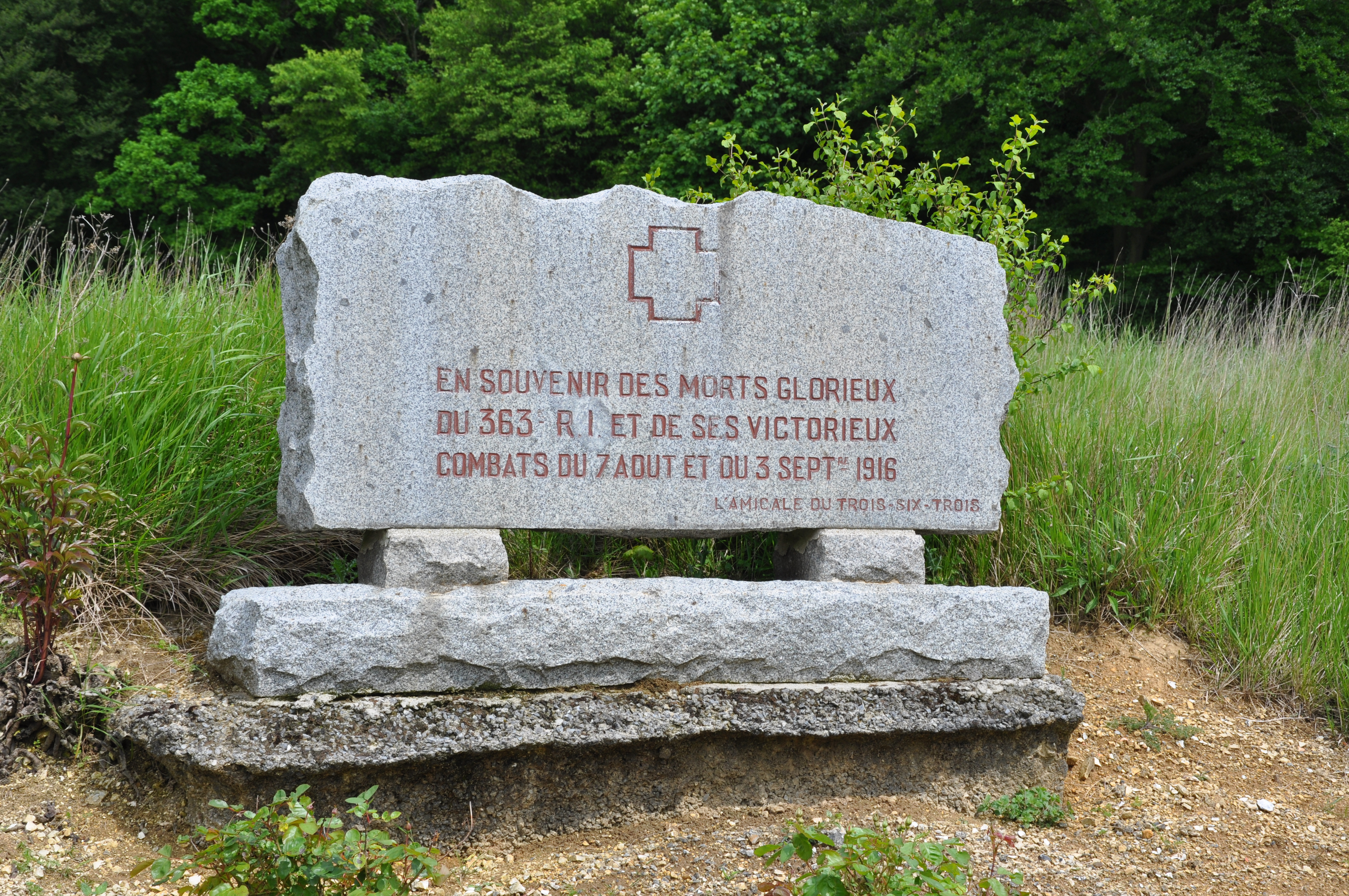
- The monument to the dead of the 363rd infantry regiment

- Coat of arms
- Location of Cléry-sur-Somme
- Location within France Location within Hauts-de-France
- Coordinates: 49°57′28″N 2°53′12″E
- Country: France
- Region: Hauts-de-France
- Department: Somme
- Arrondissement: Péronne
- Canton: Péronne
- Intercommunality: Haute Somme

Government
  - Mayor (2020–2026): Philippe Coulon
- Area^{1}: 18.78 km^{2} (7.25 sq mi)
- Elevation: 45 m (148 ft)
- Highest elevation: 144 m (472 ft)
- Lowest elevation: 45 m (148 ft)
- Population (2023): 516
  - Density: 27.5/km^{2} (71.2/sq mi)
- Time zone: UTC+01:00 (CET)
  - Summer (DST): UTC+02:00 (CEST)
- INSEE/Postal code: 80199 /80200
- ^{1} French Land Register data, which excludes lakes, ponds, glaciers > 1 km^{2} (0.386 sq mi or 247 acres) and river estuaries.

Cléry-sur-Somme (French pronunciation: [kleʁi syʁ sɔm], literally Cléry on Somme; Picard: Cléry-su-Sonme) is a commune in the Somme department in Hauts-de-France in northern France.

== Geography ==
The commune is situated on the D938, by the banks of the river Somme, some 30 miles (48 km) east of Amiens.

== Population ==
Historical population
| Year | Pop. | ±% p.a. |
|---|---|---|
| 1968 | 489 | — |
| 1975 | 493 | +0.12% |
| 1982 | 521 | +0.79% |
| 1990 | 507 | −0.34% |
| 1999 | 514 | +0.15% |
| 2007 | 531 | +0.41% |
| 2012 | 541 | +0.37% |
| 2017 | 546 | +0.18% |
| 2023 | 516 | −0.94% |
Source: INSEE

== See also ==
- Communes of the Somme department
