= Liéramont =

- Commune
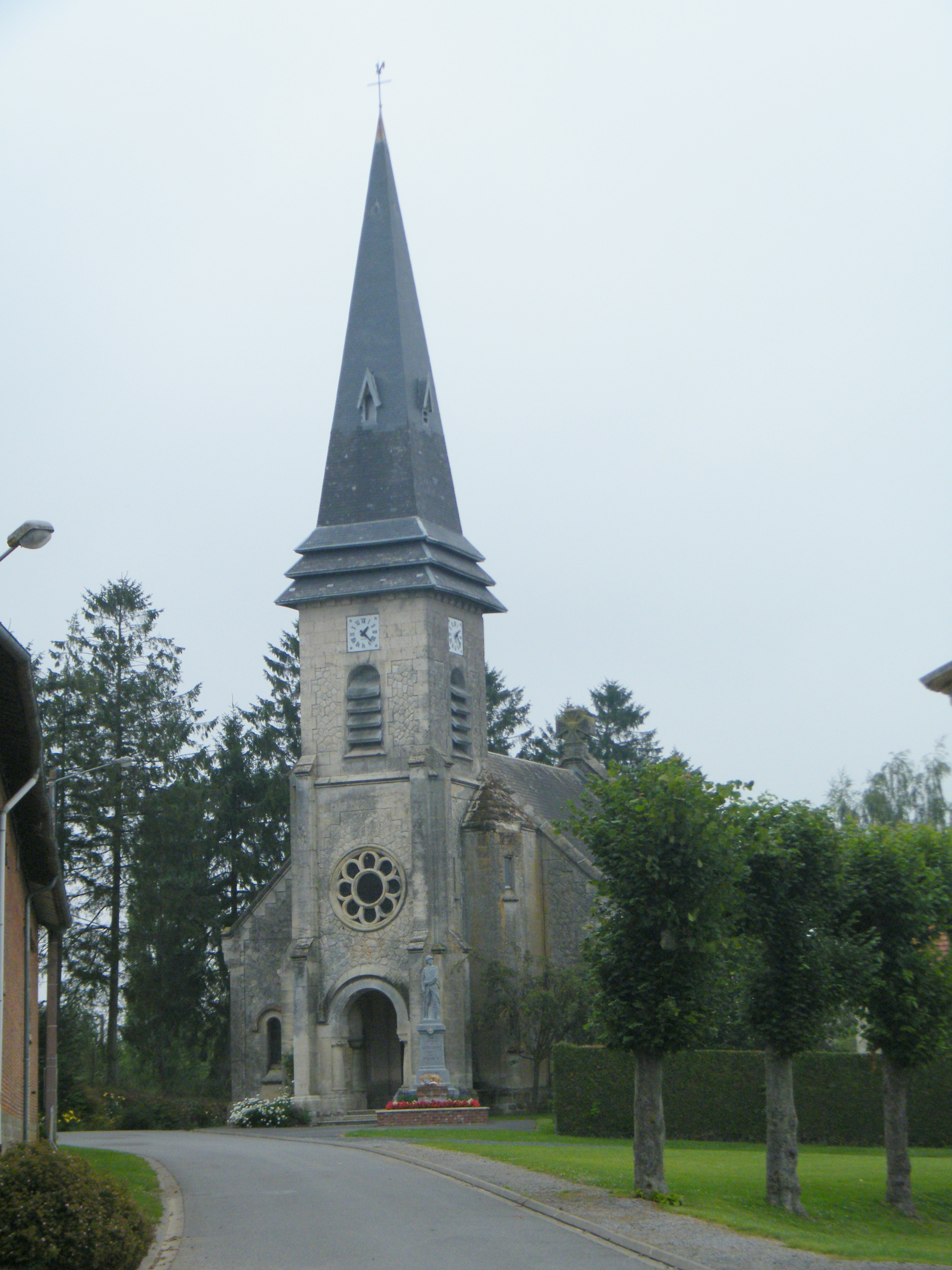
- The church in Liéramont
- Location of Liéramont
- Location within France Location within Hauts-de-France
- Coordinates: 49°59′41″N 3°03′01″E
- Country: France
- Region: Hauts-de-France
- Department: Somme
- Arrondissement: Péronne
- Canton: Péronne
- Intercommunality: Haute Somme

Government
  - Mayor (2020–2026): Marie-Odile Duflot
- Area^{1}: 7.29 km^{2} (2.81 sq mi)
- Elevation: 150 m (490 ft)
- Highest elevation: 152 m (499 ft)
- Lowest elevation: 113 m (371 ft)
- Population (2023): 217
  - Density: 29.8/km^{2} (77.1/sq mi)
- Time zone: UTC+01:00 (CET)
  - Summer (DST): UTC+02:00 (CEST)
- INSEE/Postal code: 80475 /80240
- ^{1} French Land Register data, which excludes lakes, ponds, glaciers > 1 km^{2} (0.386 sq mi or 247 acres) and river estuaries.

Liéramont (French pronunciation: [ljeʁamɔ̃]) is a commune in the Somme department in Hauts-de-France in northern France.

== Geography ==
The commune is situated on the D22 and D72 crossroads, some 20 miles (32 km) northwest of Saint-Quentin.

== Population ==
Historical population
Year	Pop.	±% p.a.
1968	265	—
1975	215	−2.94%
1982	197	−1.24%
1990	164	−2.27%
1999	182	+1.16%
2007	202	+1.31%
2012	222	+1.91%
2017	227	+0.45%
2023	217	−0.75%
Source: INSEE

== See also ==
- Communes of the Somme department
