= Barleux =

- Commune
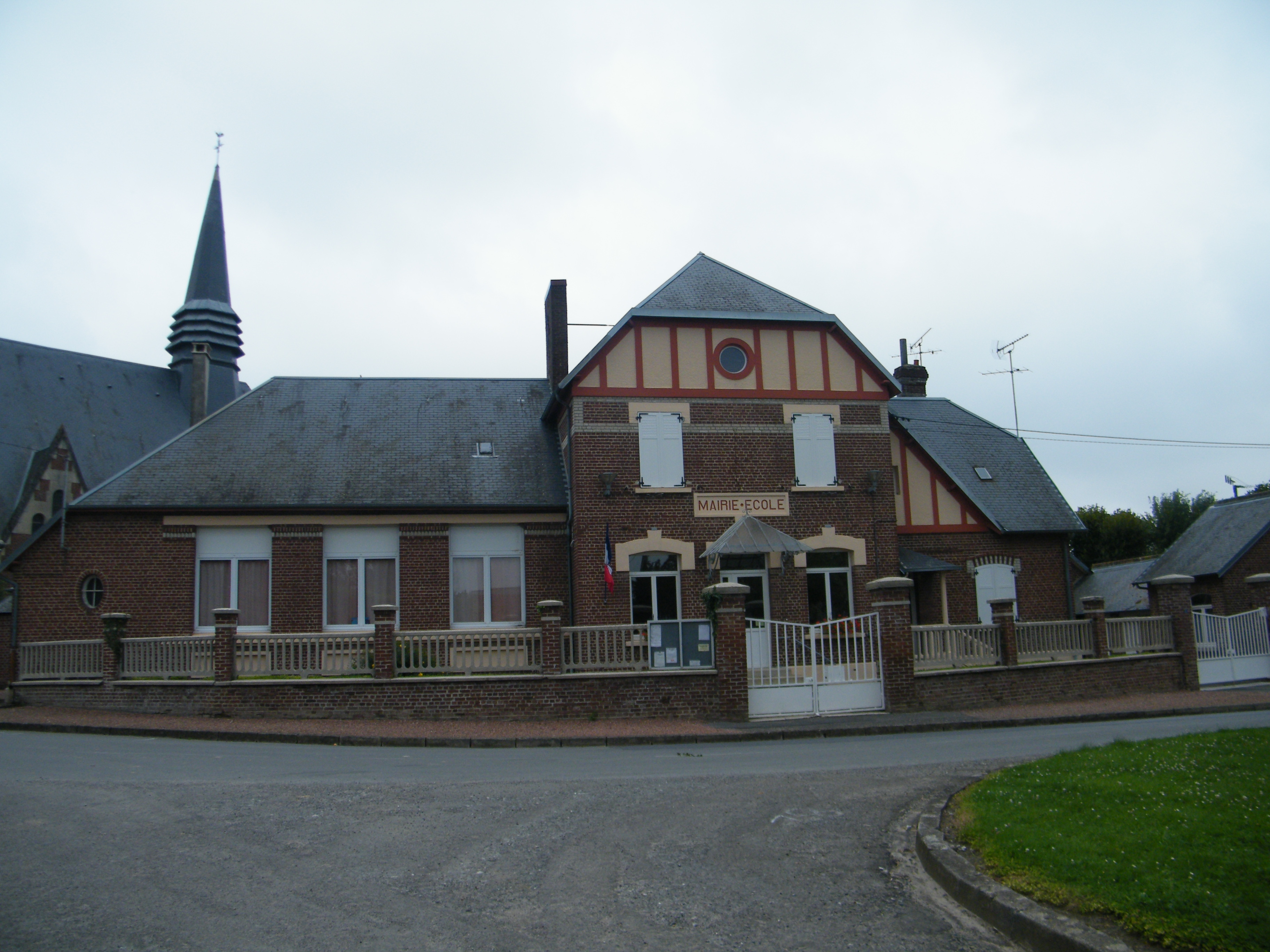
- The town hall and school of Barleux
- Location of Barleux
- Location within France Location within Hauts-de-France
- Coordinates: 49°53′51″N 2°53′28″E
- Country: France
- Region: Hauts-de-France
- Department: Somme
- Arrondissement: Péronne
- Canton: Péronne
- Intercommunality: CC Haute Somme

Government
  - Mayor (2020–2026): Eric François
- Area^{1}: 7.46 km^{2} (2.88 sq mi)
- Elevation: 48 m (157 ft)
- Highest elevation: 87 m (285 ft)
- Lowest elevation: 47 m (154 ft)
- Population (2023): 233
  - Density: 31.2/km^{2} (80.9/sq mi)
- Time zone: UTC+01:00 (CET)
  - Summer (DST): UTC+02:00 (CEST)
- INSEE/Postal code: 80054 /80200
- ^{1} French Land Register data, which excludes lakes, ponds, glaciers > 1 km^{2} (0.386 sq mi or 247 acres) and river estuaries.

Barleux (French pronunciation: [baʁlø]) is a commune in the Somme department in Hauts-de-France in northern France.

== Geography ==
Situated 3 miles (5 km) from the A1 autoroute, at the junction of the D79 and D148 roads, about halfway between Amiens and Saint-Quentin.

== Population ==
Historical population
| Year | Pop. | ±% p.a. |
|---|---|---|
| 1968 | 306 | — |
| 1975 | 301 | −0.24% |
| 1982 | 289 | −0.58% |
| 1990 | 297 | +0.34% |
| 1999 | 312 | +0.55% |
| 2007 | 290 | −0.91% |
| 2012 | 249 | −3.00% |
| 2017 | 230 | −1.57% |
| 2023 | 233 | +0.22% |
Source: INSEE

== See also ==
- Communes of the Somme department
