= Roisel =

- Commune
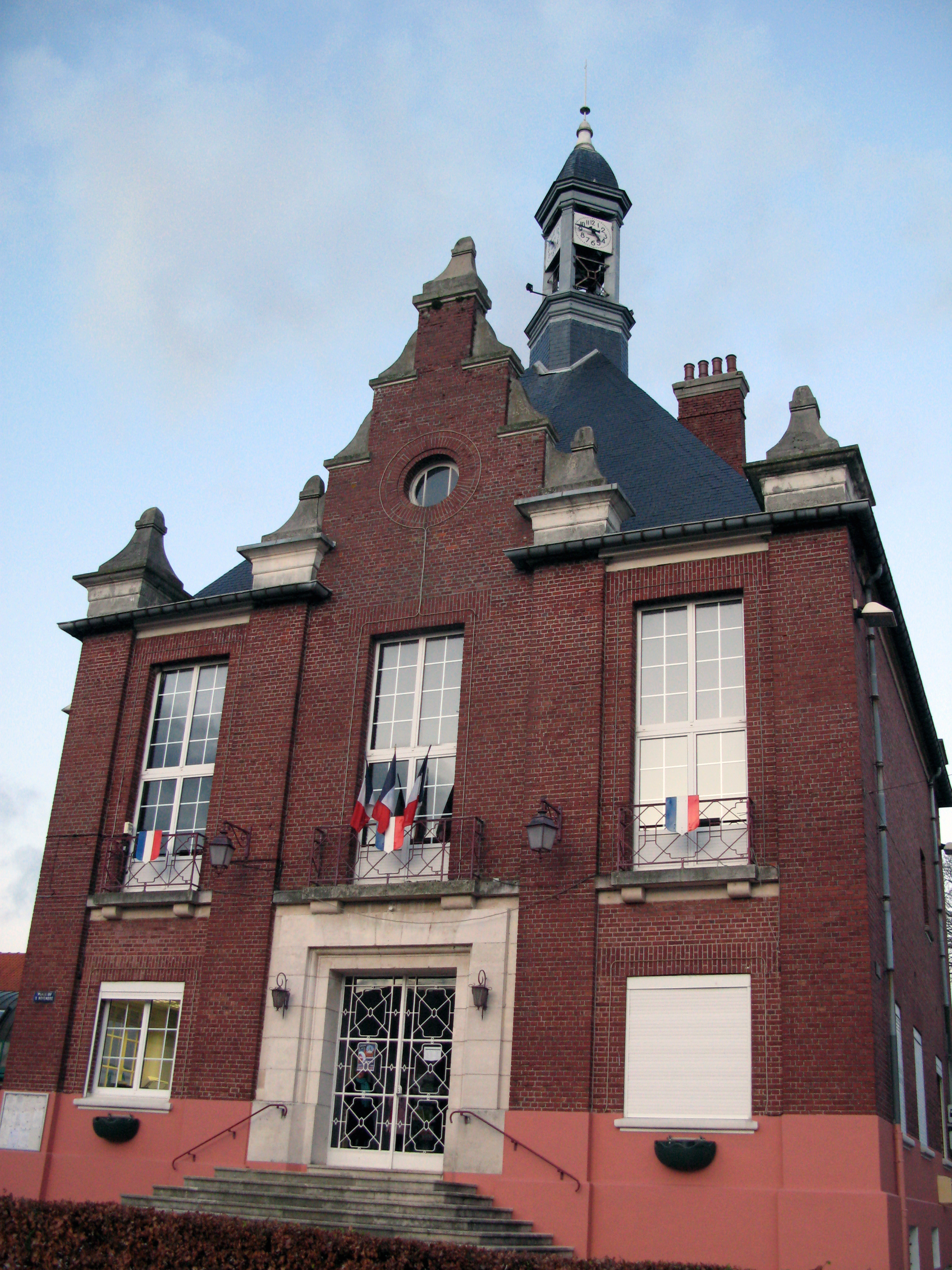
- The town hall in Roisel

- Coat of arms
- Location of Roisel
- Location within France Location within Hauts-de-France
- Coordinates: 49°56′47″N 3°05′55″E
- Country: France
- Region: Hauts-de-France
- Department: Somme
- Arrondissement: Péronne
- Canton: Péronne
- Intercommunality: Haute Somme

Government
  - Mayor (2020–2026): Jean-Jacques Flament
- Area^{1}: 10.16 km^{2} (3.92 sq mi)
- Elevation: 75 m (246 ft)
- Highest elevation: 142 m (466 ft)
- Lowest elevation: 67 m (220 ft)
- Population (2023): 1,626
  - Density: 160.0/km^{2} (414.5/sq mi)
- Time zone: UTC+01:00 (CET)
  - Summer (DST): UTC+02:00 (CEST)
- INSEE/Postal code: 80677 /80240
- ^{1} French Land Register data, which excludes lakes, ponds, glaciers > 1 km^{2} (0.386 sq mi or 247 acres) and river estuaries.

Roisel (French pronunciation: [ʁwazɛl]) is a commune in the Somme department in Hauts-de-France in northern France.

== Geography ==
Roisel is situated 10 miles (16 km) northwest of Saint-Quentin, on the D6 road, with the small river ‘La Cologne’ (a tributary of the Somme) flowing through the commune.

== Population ==
Historical population
Year	Pop.	±% p.a.
1968	1,908	—
1975	1,846	−0.47%
1982	1,976	+0.98%
1990	1,960	−0.10%
1999	1,929	−0.18%
2007	1,821	−0.72%
2012	1,740	−0.91%
2017	1,613	−1.50%
2023	1,626	+0.13%
Source: INSEE

== History ==
The name of Roisel has an etymology close to that of "roseau" (en:reed) and it's possible, given the ponds, lakes and marches, that the commune takes its name from the landscape. Roisel has strong connections with Saint Fursey.

== Places of interest ==
- St Martin's church. Destroyed during World War I, it was rebuilt by local architect Louis Faille, from Nurlu, soon after 1928
- The town hall (Hotel de ville), rebuilt in 1926 by Maurice Lucet.

== See also ==
- Communes of the Somme department
