= Feuillères =

- Commune
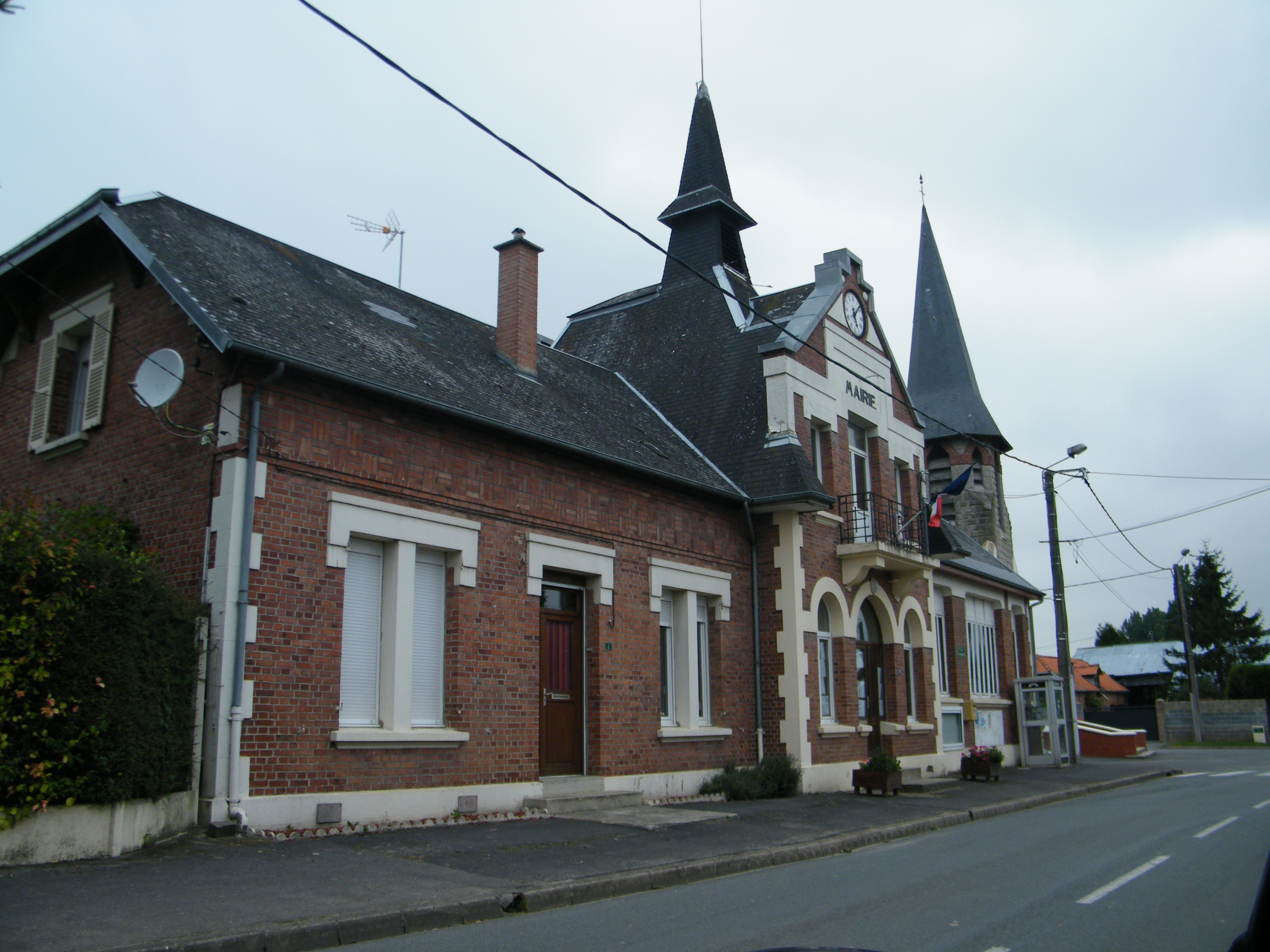
- The town hall in Feuillères
- Location of Feuillères
- Location within France Location within Hauts-de-France
- Coordinates: 49°57′N 2°51′E
- Country: France
- Region: Hauts-de-France
- Department: Somme
- Arrondissement: Péronne
- Canton: Péronne
- Intercommunality: Haute Somme

Government
  - Mayor (2020–2026): Dominique Delefortrie
- Area^{1}: 5.89 km^{2} (2.27 sq mi)
- Elevation: 50 m (160 ft)
- Highest elevation: 100 m (330 ft)
- Lowest elevation: 43 m (141 ft)
- Population (2023): 155
  - Density: 26.3/km^{2} (68.2/sq mi)
- Time zone: UTC+01:00 (CET)
  - Summer (DST): UTC+02:00 (CEST)
- INSEE/Postal code: 80307 /80200
- ^{1} French Land Register data, which excludes lakes, ponds, glaciers > 1 km^{2} (0.386 sq mi or 247 acres) and river estuaries.

Feuillères (French pronunciation: [fœjɛʁ]; Picard: Fuillère) is a commune in the Somme department and Hauts-de-France region of northern France.

== Geography ==
The commune is situated on the D146 road, on the banks of the river Somme, some 26 miles (42 km) east of Amiens.

== Population ==
Historical population
Year	Pop.	±% p.a.
1968	165	—
1975	151	−1.26%
1982	155	+0.37%
1990	149	−0.49%
1999	151	+0.15%
2007	140	−0.94%
2012	143	+0.42%
2017	147	+0.55%
2023	155	+0.89%
Source: INSEE

== See also ==
- Communes of the Somme department
