= Flaucourt =

- Commune
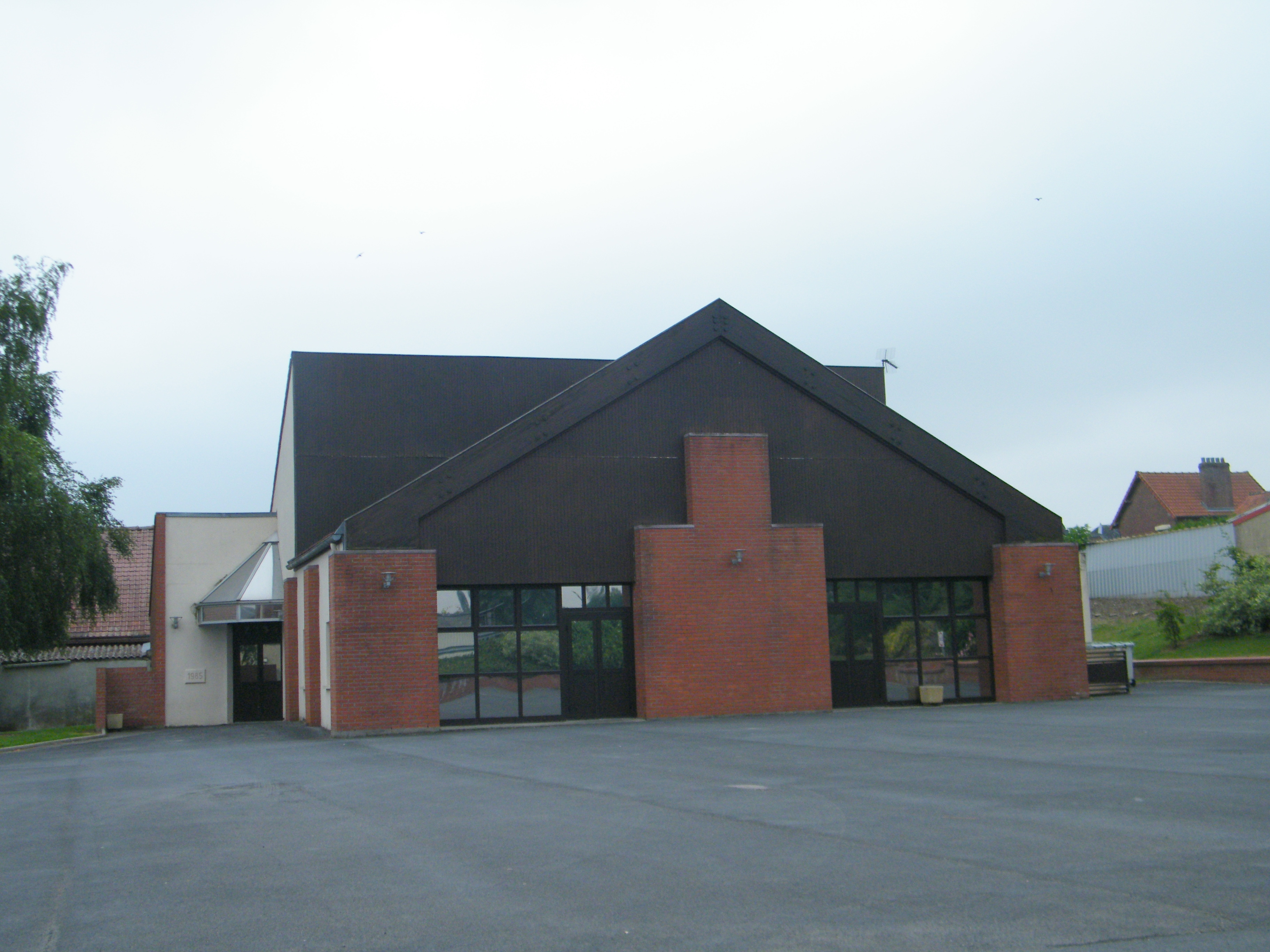
- The town hall in Flaucourt
- Location of Flaucourt
- Location within France Location within Hauts-de-France
- Coordinates: 49°54′49″N 2°51′53″E
- Country: France
- Region: Hauts-de-France
- Department: Somme
- Arrondissement: Péronne
- Canton: Péronne
- Intercommunality: Haute Somme

Government
  - Mayor (2020–2026): Valérie Gaudefroy
- Area^{1}: 7.36 km^{2} (2.84 sq mi)
- Elevation: 96 m (315 ft)
- Highest elevation: 94 m (308 ft)
- Lowest elevation: 58 m (190 ft)
- Population (2023): 299
  - Density: 40.6/km^{2} (105/sq mi)
- Time zone: UTC+01:00 (CET)
  - Summer (DST): UTC+02:00 (CEST)
- INSEE/Postal code: 80313 /80200
- ^{1} French Land Register data, which excludes lakes, ponds, glaciers > 1 km^{2} (0.386 sq mi or 247 acres) and river estuaries.

Flaucourt (French pronunciation: [flokuʁ]) is a commune in the Somme department in Hauts-de-France in northern France.

== Geography ==
Flaucourt is situated on the D148 road, half a mile from both the D1 and the A1 autoroute, some 27 miles (43 km) east of Amiens.

== Population ==
Historical population
Year	Pop.	±% p.a.
1968	327	—
1975	299	−1.27%
1982	348	+2.19%
1990	330	−0.66%
1999	324	−0.20%
2007	328	+0.15%
2012	296	−2.03%
2017	291	−0.34%
2023	299	+0.45%
Source: INSEE

== See also ==
- Communes of the Somme department
