= Biaches =

- Commune
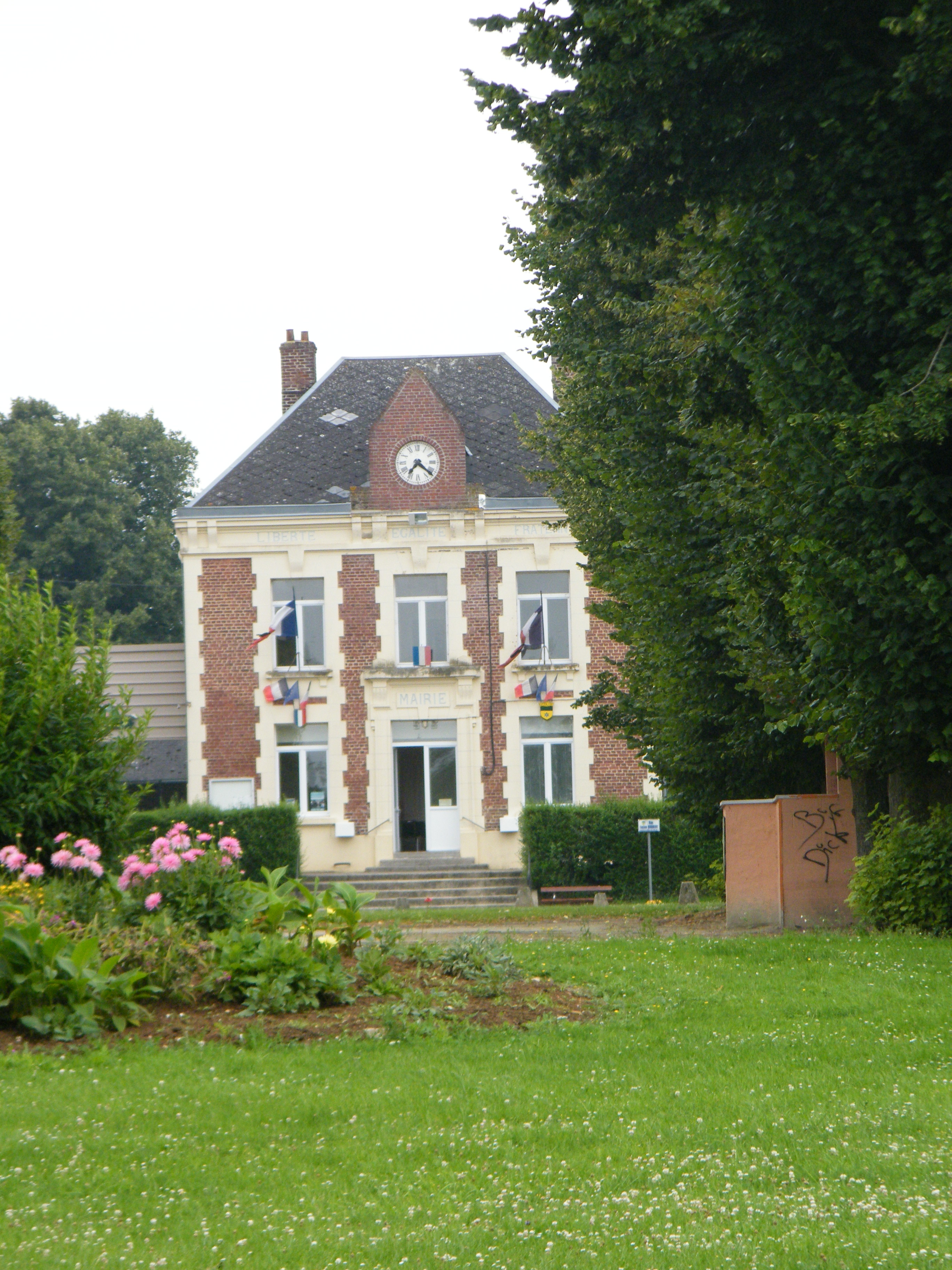
- The town hall in Biaches

- Coat of arms
- Location of Biaches
- Location within France Location within Hauts-de-France
- Coordinates: 49°55′32″N 2°54′34″E
- Country: France
- Region: Hauts-de-France
- Department: Somme
- Arrondissement: Péronne
- Canton: Péronne
- Intercommunality: Haute Somme

Government
  - Mayor (2020–2026): Ludovic Legrand
- Area^{1}: 6.52 km^{2} (2.52 sq mi)
- Elevation: 50 m (160 ft)
- Highest elevation: 91 m (299 ft)
- Lowest elevation: 47 m (154 ft)
- Population (2023): 386
  - Density: 59.2/km^{2} (153/sq mi)
- Time zone: UTC+01:00 (CET)
  - Summer (DST): UTC+02:00 (CEST)
- INSEE/Postal code: 80102 /80200
- ^{1} French Land Register data, which excludes lakes, ponds, glaciers > 1 km^{2} (0.386 sq mi or 247 acres) and river estuaries.

Biaches (French pronunciation: [bjaʃ]) is a commune in the Somme department in Hauts-de-France in northern France.

== Geography ==
Biaches is situated by the banks of the Somme, 30 miles (48 km) east of Amiens on the D1 and 2 miles (3 km) from the A29 autoroute.

== Population ==
Historical population
Year	Pop.	±% p.a.
1968	341	—
1975	377	+1.44%
1982	410	+1.21%
1990	427	+0.51%
1999	416	−0.29%
2007	407	−0.27%
2012	358	−2.53%
2017	384	+1.41%
2023	386	+0.09%
Source: INSEE

== See also ==
- Communes of the Somme department
