= Saulcourt Churchyard Extension =

CWGC cemetery in Some, France

Coordinates: 49.9964°N 3.0845°E

Saulcourt Churchyard Extension is a military cemetery in the French town Guyencourt-Saulcourt (Somme). The graves are maintained by the Commonwealth War Graves Commission. There are 76 graves there of service members who died during World War I, of which 70 are graves of Commonwealth service members and 6 from other origins.
