= Guyencourt-Saulcourt =

- Commune
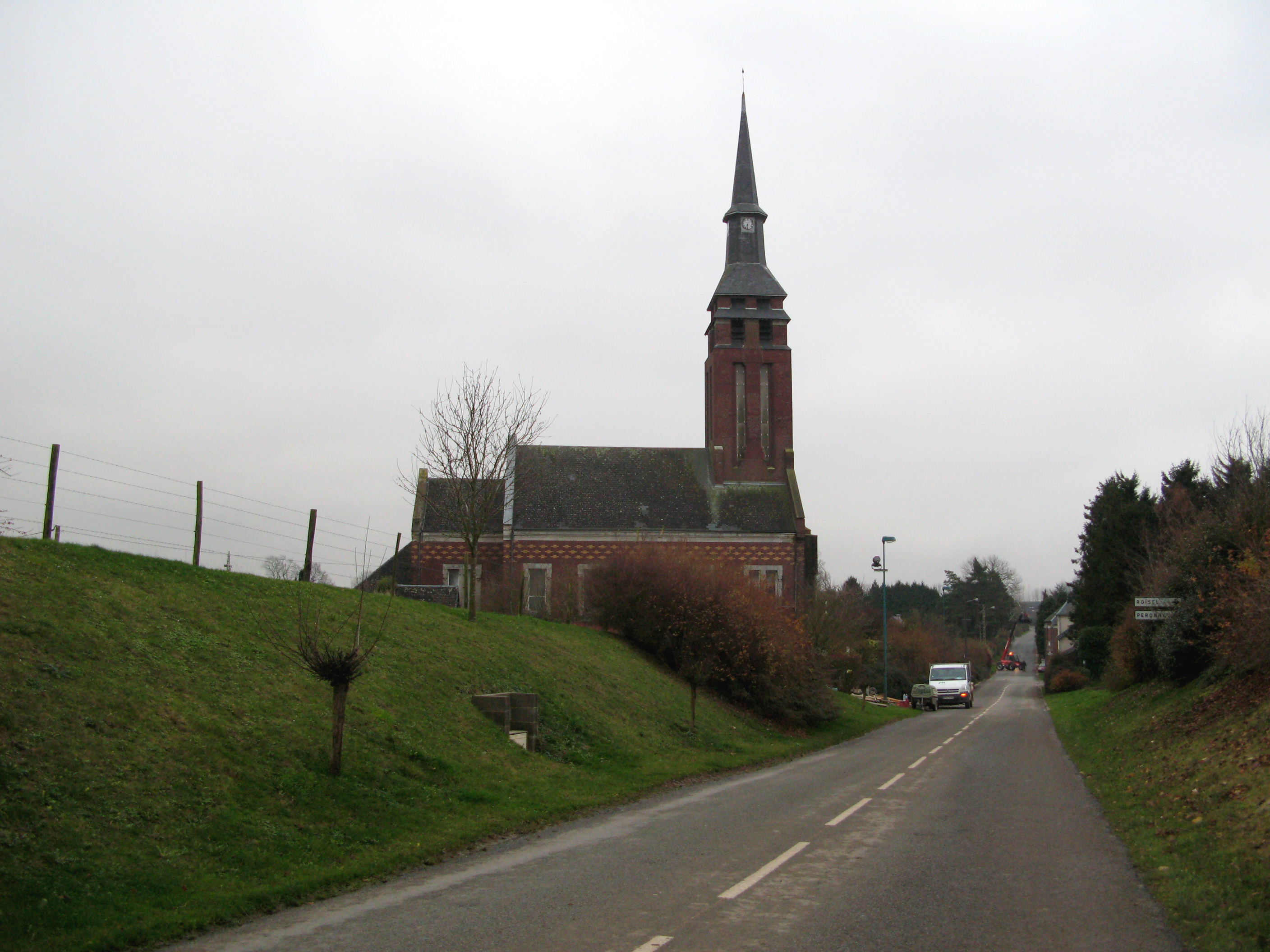
- The church in Guyencourt-Saulcourt
- Location of Guyencourt-Saulcourt
- Location within France Location within Hauts-de-France
- Coordinates: 50°00′01″N 3°04′51″E
- Country: France
- Region: Hauts-de-France
- Department: Somme
- Arrondissement: Péronne
- Canton: Péronne
- Intercommunality: Haute Somme

Government
  - Mayor (2020–2026): Jean-Marie Blondelle
- Area^{1}: 5 km^{2} (1.9 sq mi)
- Elevation: 150 m (490 ft)
- Highest elevation: 147 m (482 ft)
- Lowest elevation: 110 m (360 ft)
- Population (2023): 145
  - Density: 29/km^{2} (75/sq mi)
- Time zone: UTC+01:00 (CET)
  - Summer (DST): UTC+02:00 (CEST)
- INSEE/Postal code: 80404 /80240
- ^{1} French Land Register data, which excludes lakes, ponds, glaciers > 1 km^{2} (0.386 sq mi or 247 acres) and river estuaries.

Guyencourt-Saulcourt is a commune in the Somme department in Hauts-de-France in northern France.

== Geography ==
The commune is situated on the D181 road, some 18 miles (29 km) northwest of Saint-Quentin.

== Population ==
Historical population
Year	Pop.	±% p.a.
1968	207	—
1975	169	−2.86%
1982	139	−2.75%
1990	137	−0.18%
1999	148	+0.86%
2007	134	−1.23%
2012	145	+1.59%
2017	140	−0.70%
2023	145	+0.59%
Source: INSEE

== See also ==
- Communes of the Somme department
- Saulcourt Churchyard Extension
