= Éterpigny, Somme =

Éterpigny
- Commune
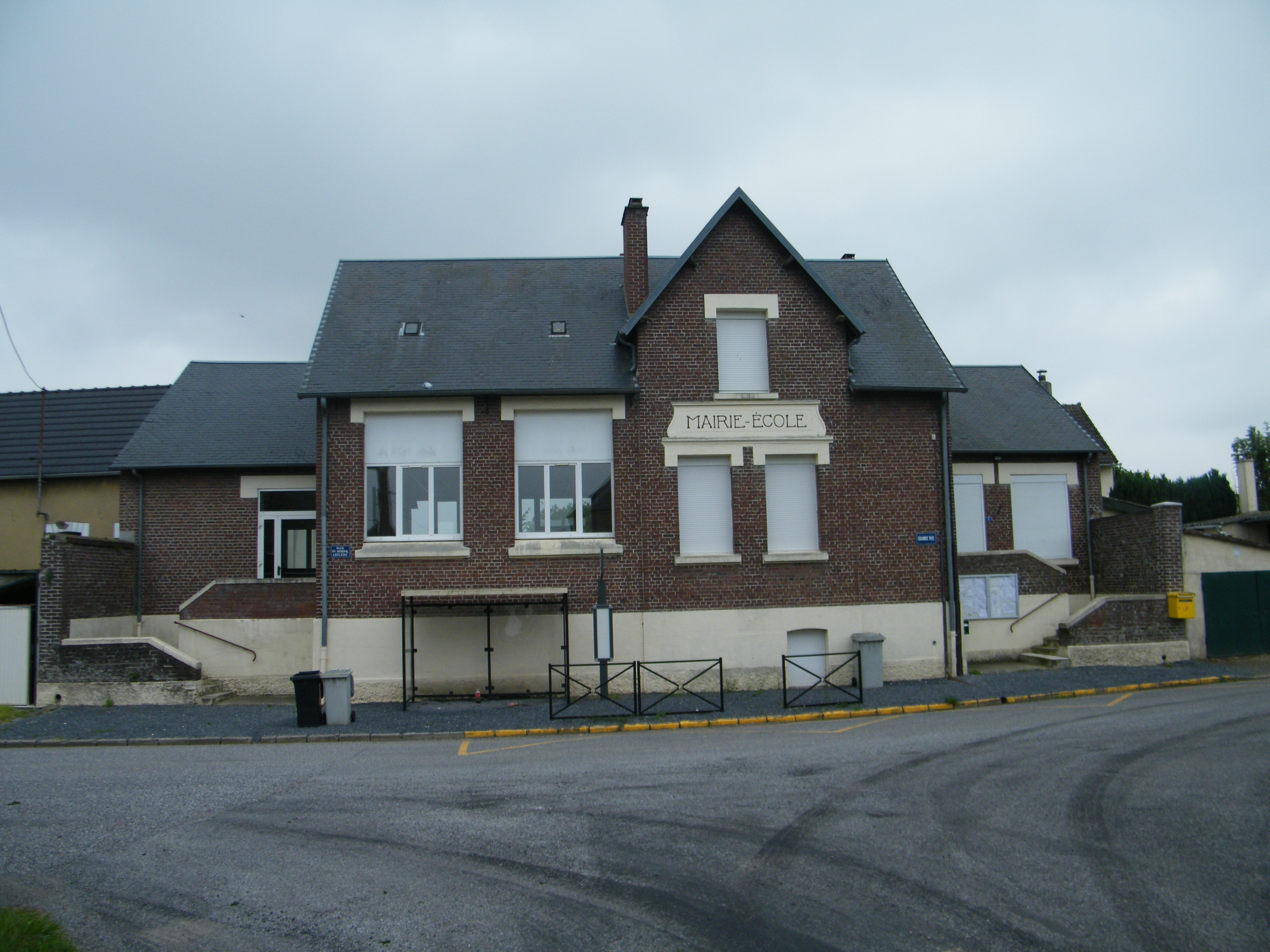
- Town hall
- Location of Éterpigny
- Location within France Location within Hauts-de-France
- Coordinates: 49°53′30″N 2°55′36″E
- Country: France
- Region: Hauts-de-France
- Department: Somme
- Arrondissement: Péronne
- Canton: Péronne
- Intercommunality: Haute Somme

Government
  - Mayor (2020–2026): Nicolas Prousel
- Area^{1}: 4.05 km^{2} (1.56 sq mi)
- Elevation: 50 m (160 ft)
- Highest elevation: 82 m (269 ft)
- Lowest elevation: 47 m (154 ft)
- Population (2023): 166
  - Density: 41.0/km^{2} (106/sq mi)
- Time zone: UTC+01:00 (CET)
  - Summer (DST): UTC+02:00 (CEST)
- INSEE/Postal code: 80294 /80200
- ^{1} French Land Register data, which excludes lakes, ponds, glaciers > 1 km^{2} (0.386 sq mi or 247 acres) and river estuaries.

Éterpigny (French pronunciation: [etɛʁpiɲi]; Picard: Étèrpigny) is a commune in the Somme department in Hauts-de-France in northern France.

== Geography ==
Éterpigny is situated on the banks of the river Somme, at the junction of the N17 and D62 roads, some 48 km (30 mi) east of Amiens.

== Population ==
Historical population
Year	Pop.	±% p.a.
1968	124	—
1975	143	+2.06%
1982	167	+2.24%
1990	185	+1.29%
1999	184	−0.06%
2007	179	−0.34%
2012	174	−0.57%
2017	168	−0.70%
2023	166	−0.20%
Source: INSEE

== See also ==
- Communes of the Somme department
