= Aizecourt-le-Haut =

Commune in Hauts-de-France, France

- Commune
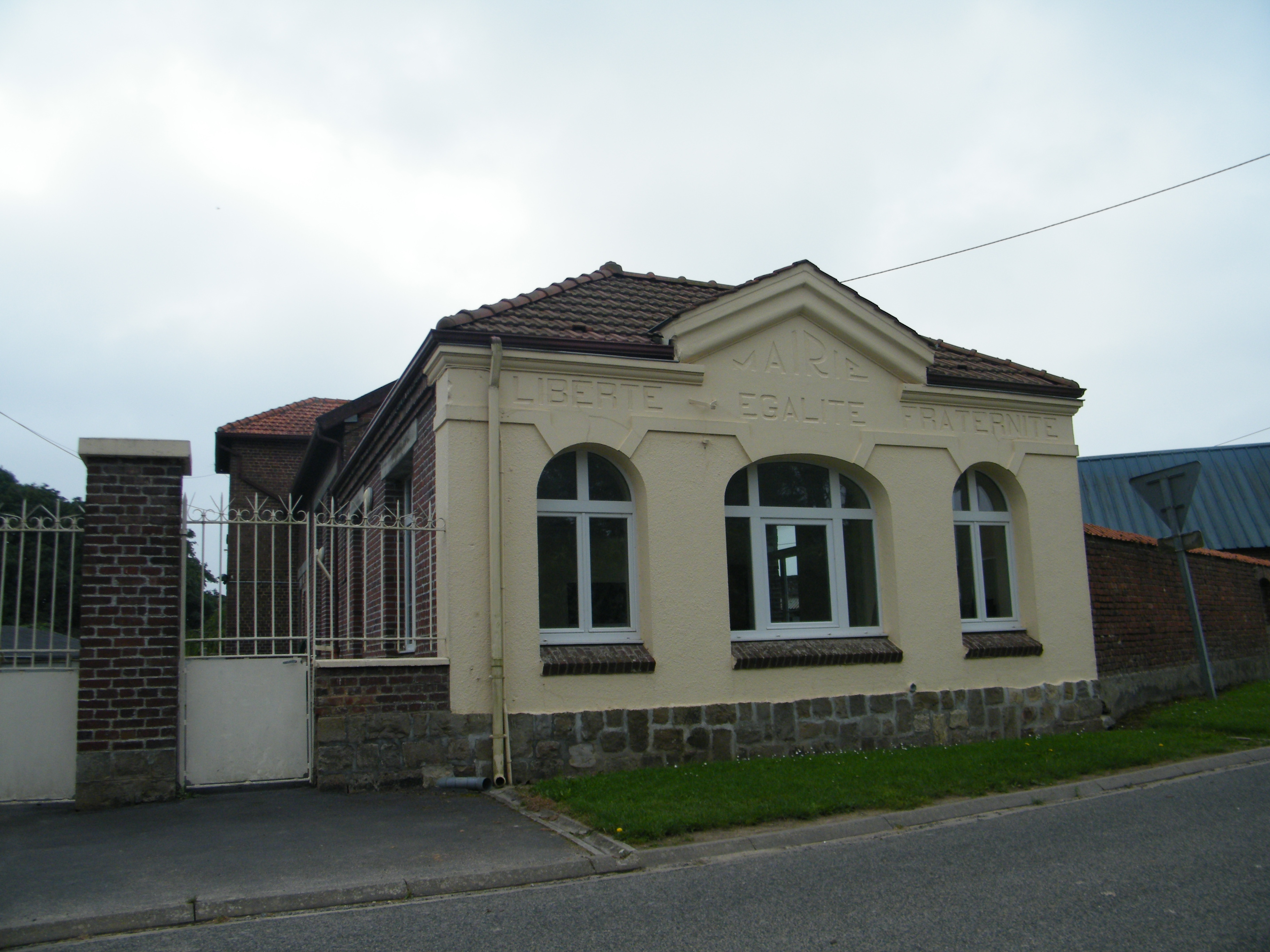
- The town hall of Aizecourt-le-Haut

- Coat of arms
- Location of Aizecourt-le-Haut
- Location within France Location within Hauts-de-France
- Coordinates: 49°57′51″N 2°59′03″E
- Country: France
- Region: Hauts-de-France
- Department: Somme
- Arrondissement: Péronne
- Canton: Péronne
- Intercommunality: Haute-Somme

Government
  - Mayor (2020–2026): Rose-Line Laout
- Area^{1}: 3.65 km^{2} (1.41 sq mi)
- Elevation: 120 m (390 ft)
- Highest elevation: 147 m (482 ft)
- Lowest elevation: 78 m (256 ft)
- Population (2023): 66
  - Density: 18/km^{2} (47/sq mi)
- Time zone: UTC+01:00 (CET)
  - Summer (DST): UTC+02:00 (CEST)
- INSEE/Postal code: 80015 /80200
- ^{1} French Land Register data, which excludes lakes, ponds, glaciers > 1 km^{2} (0.386 sq mi or 247 acres) and river estuaries.

Aizecourt-le-Haut (French pronunciation: [ɛzkuʁ lə o]; Picard: Aizcourt-Heut) is a commune in the Somme department in Hauts-de-France in northern France.

== Geography ==
The commune is on the D917 departmental road, 35 km (22 mi) northeast of Saint-Quentin.

== Population ==
Historical population
Year	Pop.	±% p.a.
1968	69	—
1975	72	+0.61%
1982	54	−4.03%
1990	80	+5.04%
1999	100	+2.51%
2007	89	−1.45%
2012	75	−3.37%
2017	67	−2.23%
2023	66	−0.25%
Source: INSEE

== See also ==
- Communes of the Somme department
