= Villers-Carbonnel =

- Commune
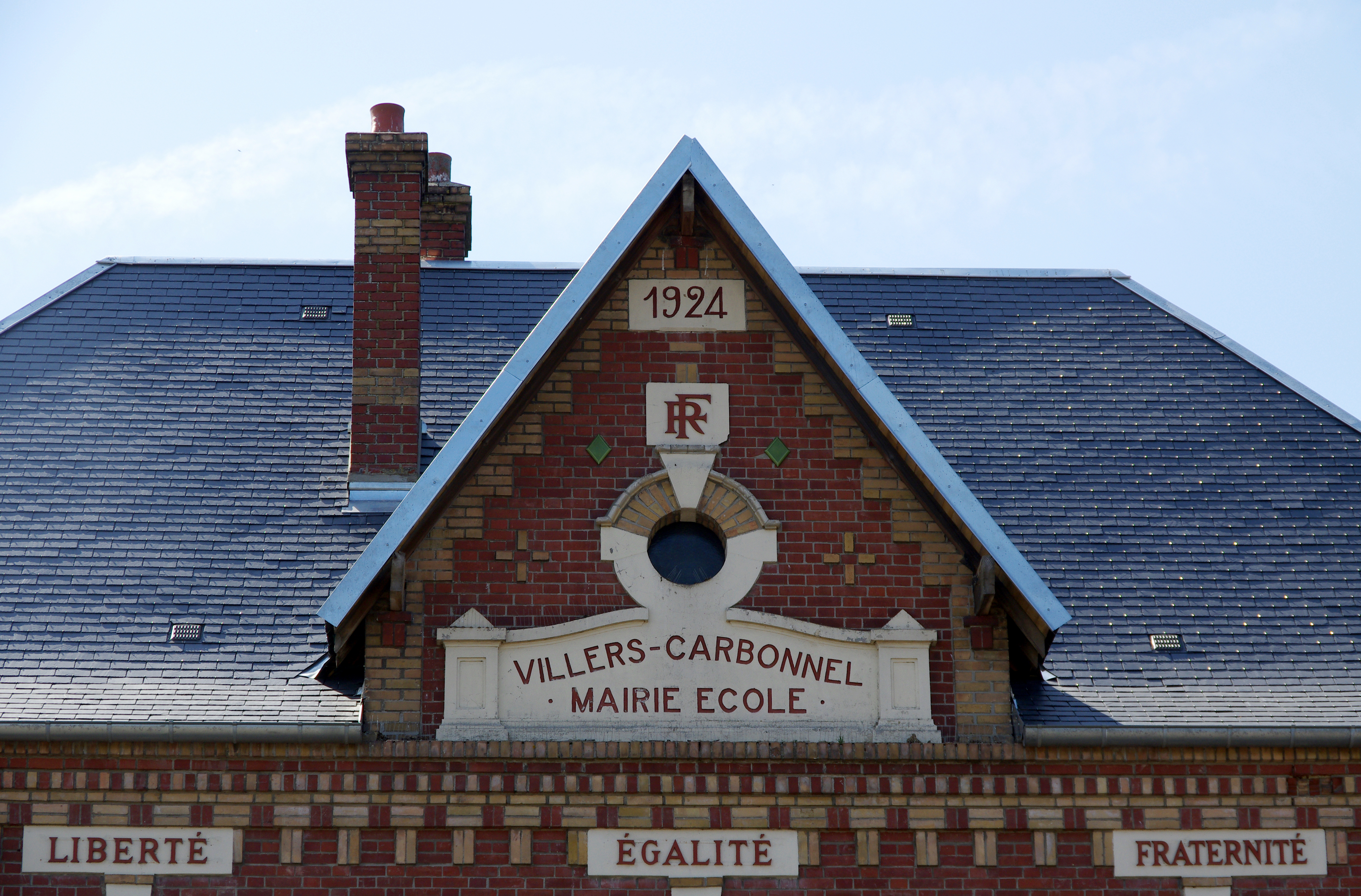
- The town hall and school in Villers-Carbonnel
- Location of Villers-Carbonnel
- Location within France Location within Hauts-de-France
- Coordinates: 49°52′38″N 2°53′51″E
- Country: France
- Region: Hauts-de-France
- Department: Somme
- Arrondissement: Péronne
- Canton: Péronne
- Intercommunality: Haute Somme

Government
  - Mayor (2020–2026): Grégory Orr
- Area^{1}: 7.66 km^{2} (2.96 sq mi)
- Elevation: 82 m (269 ft)
- Highest elevation: 85 m (279 ft)
- Lowest elevation: 47 m (154 ft)
- Population (2023): 294
  - Density: 38.4/km^{2} (99.4/sq mi)
- Time zone: UTC+01:00 (CET)
  - Summer (DST): UTC+02:00 (CEST)
- INSEE/Postal code: 80801 /80200
- ^{1} French Land Register data, which excludes lakes, ponds, glaciers > 1 km^{2} (0.386 sq mi or 247 acres) and river estuaries.

Villers-Carbonnel (French pronunciation: [vilɛʁ kaʁbɔnɛl]) is a commune in the Somme department in Hauts-de-France in northern France.

== Geography ==
The commune is situated 40 km (25 mi) east of Amiens, at the N17 and N29 crossroads.

== Population ==
Historical population
Year	Pop.	±% p.a.
1968	319	—
1975	291	−1.30%
1982	267	−1.22%
1990	272	+0.23%
1999	304	+1.24%
2007	299	−0.21%
2012	321	+1.43%
2017	366	+2.66%
2023	294	−3.59%
Source: INSEE

== See also ==
- Communes of the Somme department
