= Bussu, Somme =

Bussu
- Commune
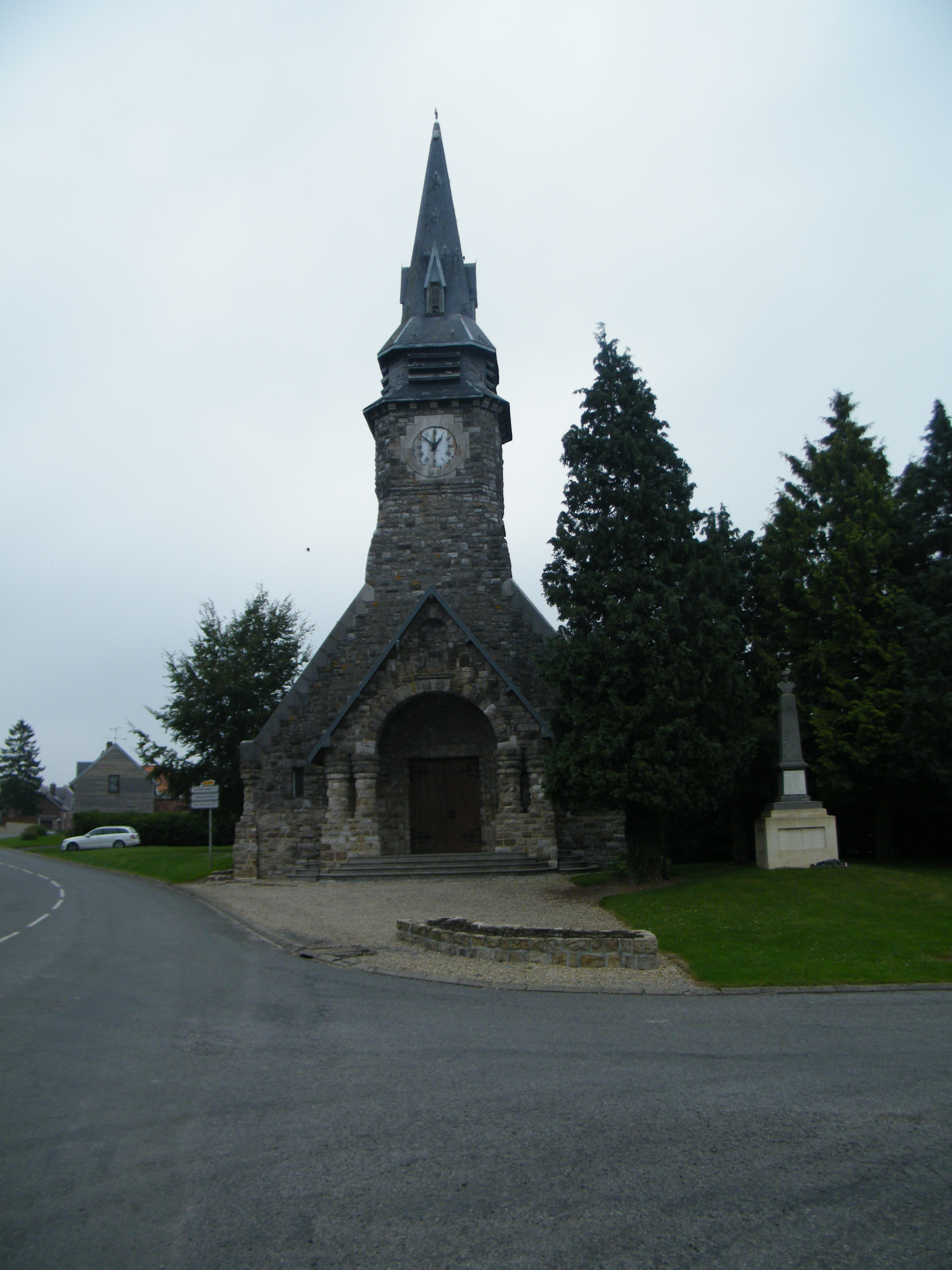
- The church in Bussu
- Location of Bussu
- Location within France Location within Hauts-de-France
- Coordinates: 49°56′47″N 2°58′39″E
- Country: France
- Region: Hauts-de-France
- Department: Somme
- Arrondissement: Péronne
- Canton: Péronne
- Intercommunality: Haute Somme

Government
  - Mayor (2020–2026): Géry Compere
- Area^{1}: 6.79 km^{2} (2.62 sq mi)
- Elevation: 70 m (230 ft)
- Highest elevation: 129 m (423 ft)
- Lowest elevation: 52 m (171 ft)
- Population (2023): 207
  - Density: 30.5/km^{2} (79.0/sq mi)
- Time zone: UTC+01:00 (CET)
  - Summer (DST): UTC+02:00 (CEST)
- INSEE/Postal code: 80154 /80200
- ^{1} French Land Register data, which excludes lakes, ponds, glaciers > 1 km^{2} (0.386 sq mi or 247 acres) and river estuaries.

Bussu (French pronunciation: [bysy]) is a commune in the Somme département in Hauts-de-France in northern France.

== Geography ==
Bussu is situated on the D181 road, some 20 miles (32 km) northwest of Saint-Quentin.

== Population ==
Historical population
Year	Pop.	±% p.a.
1968	255	—
1975	244	−0.63%
1982	260	+0.91%
1990	231	−1.47%
1999	229	−0.10%
2007	216	−0.73%
2012	217	+0.09%
2017	213	−0.37%
2023	207	−0.48%
Source: INSEE

== See also ==
- Communes of the Somme department
