= Bouvincourt-en-Vermandois =

- Commune
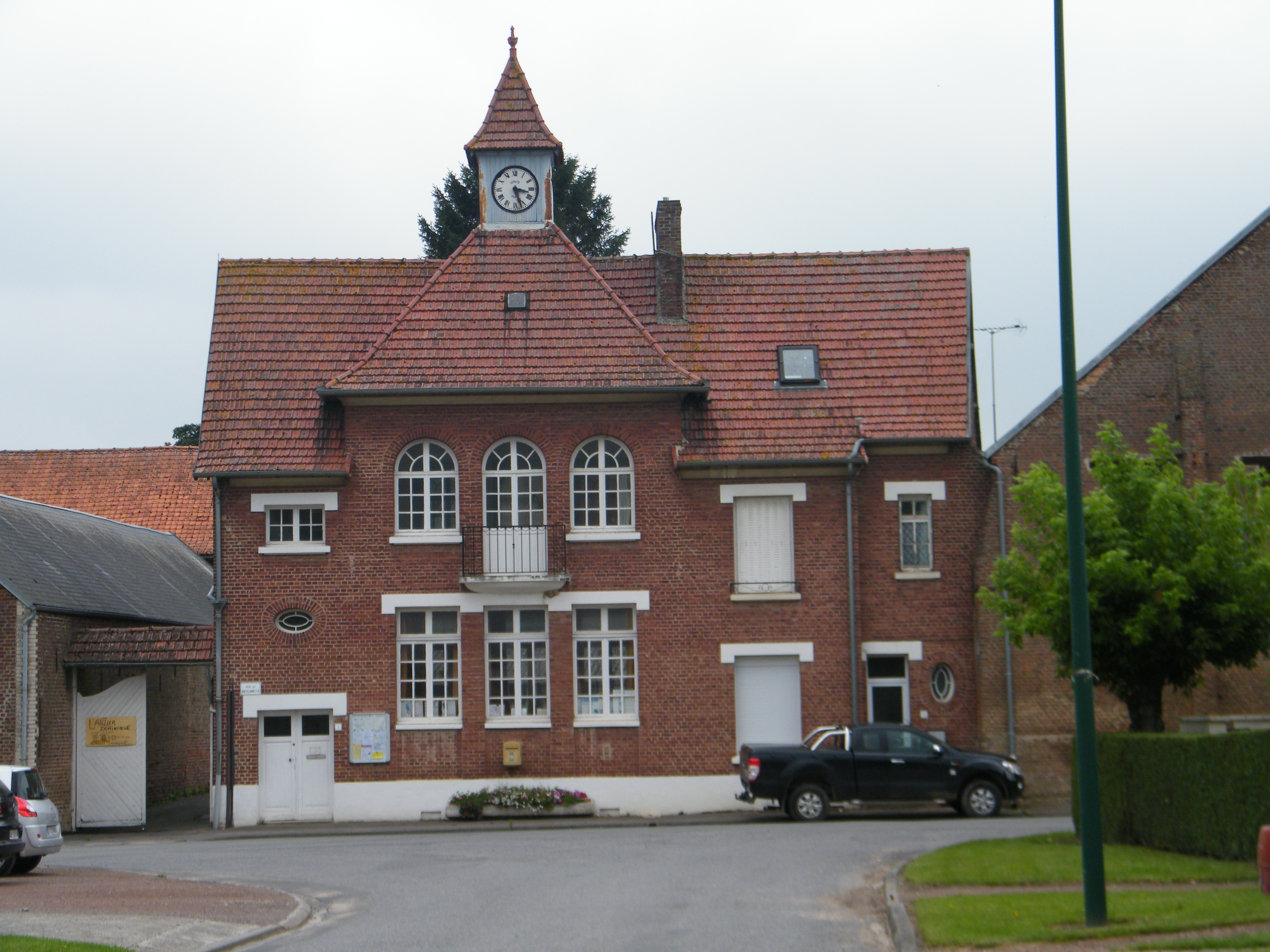
- The town hall and school in Bouvincourt-en-Vermandois

- Coat of arms
- Location of Bouvincourt-en-Vermandois
- Location within France Location within Hauts-de-France
- Coordinates: 49°53′37″N 3°02′32″E
- Country: France
- Region: Hauts-de-France
- Department: Somme
- Arrondissement: Péronne
- Canton: Péronne
- Intercommunality: Haute Somme

Government
  - Mayor (2020–2026): Fabrice Tricotet
- Area^{1}: 1.94 km^{2} (0.75 sq mi)
- Elevation: 112 m (367 ft)
- Highest elevation: 101 m (331 ft)
- Lowest elevation: 84 m (276 ft)
- Population (2023): 154
  - Density: 79.4/km^{2} (206/sq mi)
- Time zone: UTC+01:00 (CET)
  - Summer (DST): UTC+02:00 (CEST)
- INSEE/Postal code: 80128 /80200
- ^{1} French Land Register data, which excludes lakes, ponds, glaciers > 1 km^{2} (0.386 sq mi or 247 acres) and river estuaries.

Bouvincourt-en-Vermandois is a commune in the Somme department in Hauts-de-France in northern France.

== Geography ==
The commune is situated on the D268 road, some 23 kilometres (14 mi) northwest of Saint-Quentin.

== Population ==
Historical population
Year	Pop.	±% p.a.
1968	154	—
1975	154	+0.00%
1982	144	−0.95%
1990	145	+0.09%
1999	137	−0.63%
2007	150	+1.14%
2012	155	+0.66%
2017	151	−0.52%
2023	154	+0.33%
Source: INSEE

== See also ==
- Communes of the Somme department
