= Mesnil-Bruntel =

- Commune
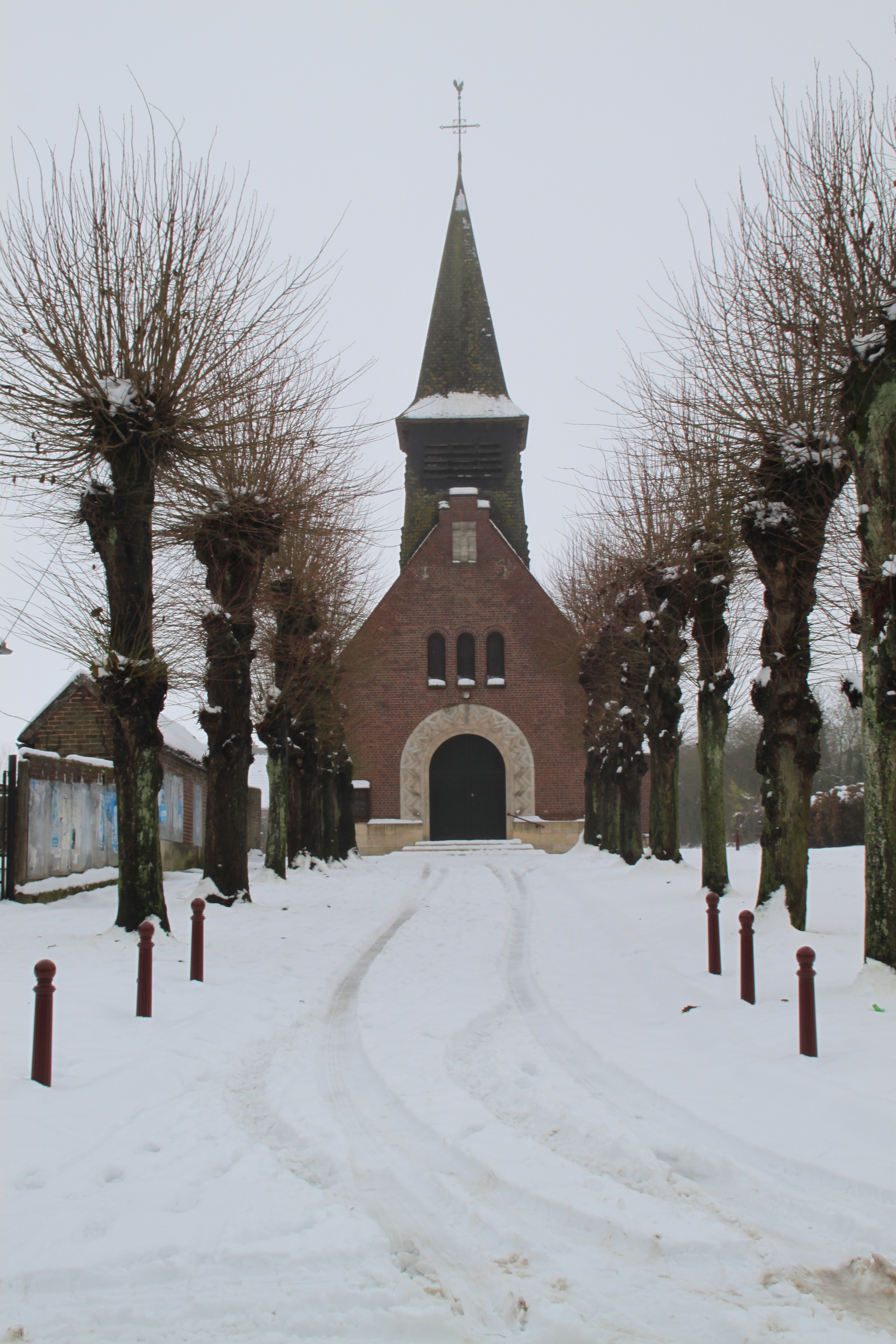
- The church in Mesnil-Bruntel
- Location of Mesnil-Bruntel
- Location within France Location within Hauts-de-France
- Coordinates: 49°53′51″N 2°57′34″E
- Country: France
- Region: Hauts-de-France
- Department: Somme
- Arrondissement: Péronne
- Canton: Péronne
- Intercommunality: Haute Somme

Government
  - Mayor (2020–2026): Jean-Dominique Payen
- Area^{1}: 7.31 km^{2} (2.82 sq mi)
- Elevation: 53 m (174 ft)
- Highest elevation: 85 m (279 ft)
- Lowest elevation: 48 m (157 ft)
- Population (2023): 290
  - Density: 40/km^{2} (100/sq mi)
- Time zone: UTC+01:00 (CET)
  - Summer (DST): UTC+02:00 (CEST)
- INSEE/Postal code: 80536 /80200
- ^{1} French Land Register data, which excludes lakes, ponds, glaciers > 1 km^{2} (0.386 sq mi or 247 acres) and river estuaries.

Mesnil-Bruntel (French pronunciation: [mɛnil bʁœ̃tɛl], Picard: Ch'Moéni-Brèneti) is a commune in the Somme department in Hauts-de-France in northern France.

== Geography ==
The commune is situated on the D88 road, some 15 miles (24 km) west-northwest of Saint-Quentin, about a mile from the banks of the river Somme.

== Population ==
Historical population
Year	Pop.	±% p.a.
1968	259	—
1975	277	+0.96%
1982	326	+2.35%
1990	341	+0.56%
1999	329	−0.40%
2007	307	−0.86%
2012	300	−0.46%
2017	288	−0.81%
2023	290	+0.12%
Source: INSEE

== See also ==
- Communes of the Somme department
