= Nurlu, Somme =

Nurlu
- Commune
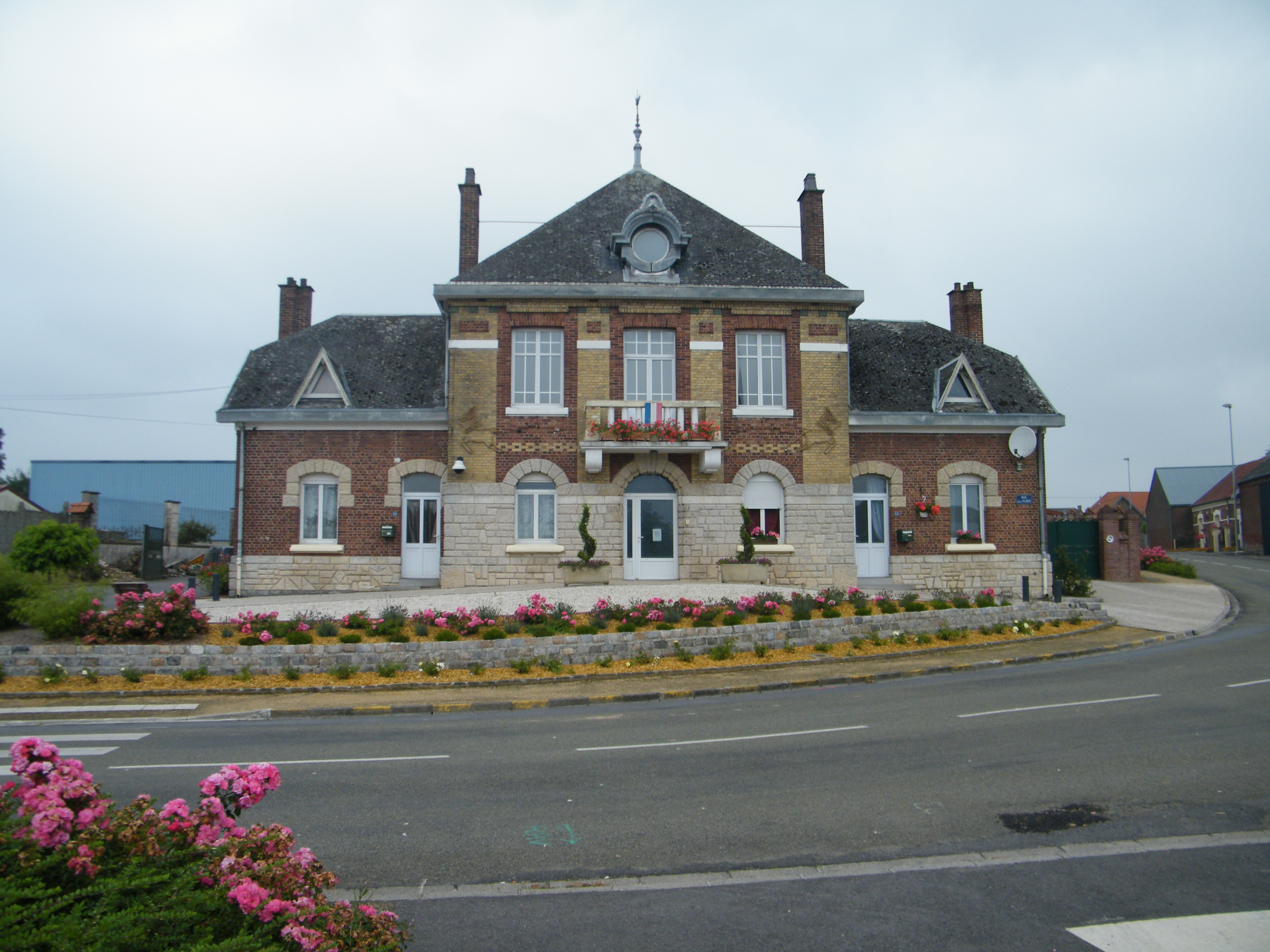
- The town hall and school in Nurlu
- Location of Nurlu
- Location within France Location within Hauts-de-France
- Coordinates: 50°00′27″N 3°01′14″E
- Country: France
- Region: Hauts-de-France
- Department: Somme
- Arrondissement: Péronne
- Canton: Péronne
- Intercommunality: Haute Somme

Government
  - Mayor (2020–2026): Pascal Douay
- Area^{1}: 6.53 km^{2} (2.52 sq mi)
- Elevation: 150 m (490 ft)
- Highest elevation: 154 m (505 ft)
- Lowest elevation: 115 m (377 ft)
- Population (2023): 373
  - Density: 57.1/km^{2} (148/sq mi)
- Time zone: UTC+01:00 (CET)
  - Summer (DST): UTC+02:00 (CEST)
- INSEE/Postal code: 80601 /80240
- ^{1} French Land Register data, which excludes lakes, ponds, glaciers > 1 km^{2} (0.386 sq mi or 247 acres) and river estuaries.

Nurlu (French pronunciation: [nyʁly]) is a commune in the Somme department in Hauts-de-France in northern France.

== Geography ==
Nurlu is situated on the D917 road, some 15 miles (24 km) northwest of Saint-Quentin, in the far south-east of the département.

== Population ==
Historical population
Year	Pop.	±% p.a.
1968	456	—
1975	410	−1.51%
1982	363	−1.72%
1990	347	−0.56%
1999	378	+0.96%
2007	373	−0.17%
2012	399	+1.36%
2017	387	−0.61%
2023	373	−0.61%
Source: INSEE

== Places of interest ==
- The church, rebuilt by local architect Louis Faille.
- The Mairie and school, also rebuilt by Faille
- The house of Louis Faille

== See also ==
- Communes of the Somme department
