= Canton of Roisel =

Coordinates: 49°56′47″N 3°5′55″E

Roisel
- Former canton
- Interactive map of Roisel
- Country: France
- Region: Hauts-de-France
- Department: Somme
- No. of communes: {{{nbcomm}}}
- Disbanded: 2015
- Area: 162.62 km^{2} (62.79 sq mi)
- Population (2012): 7,667
  - Density: 47.15/km^{2} (122.1/sq mi)

The Canton of Roisel is a former canton situated in the department of the Somme and in the Picardie region of northern France. It was disbanded following the French canton reorganisation which came into effect in March 2015. It consisted of 22 communes, which joined the canton of Péronne in 2015. It had 7,667 inhabitants (2012).

== Geography ==
The canton is organised around the commune of Roisel in the arrondissement of Péronne. The altitude varies from 59 m (Tincourt-Boucly) to 152 m (Liéramont) for an average of 103 m.

The canton comprised 22 communes:

- Aizecourt-le-Bas
- Bernes
- Driencourt
- Épehy
- Fins
- Guyencourt-Saulcourt
- Hancourt
- Hervilly
- Hesbécourt
- Heudicourt
- Liéramont
- Longavesnes
- Marquaix
- Pœuilly
- Roisel
- Ronssoy
- Sorel
- Templeux-la-Fosse
- Templeux-le-Guérard
- Tincourt-Boucly
- Villers-Faucon
- Vraignes-en-Vermandois

== Population ==
Population Growth
1962	1968	1975	1982	1990	1999
8243	8768	8014	7835	7733	7689
Census count starting from 1962 : Population without double counting

== See also ==
- Arrondissements of the Somme department
- Cantons of the Somme department
- Communes of the Somme department
