= Communauté de communes du canton de Roisel =

Coordinates: 49.9458°N 3.0984°E

canton de Roisel
- Former communauté de communes
- Interactive map of canton de Roisel
- Country: France
- Region: Hauts-de-France
- Department: Somme
- No. of communes: {{{nbcomm}}}
- Disbanded: 2013
- Area: 163 km^{2} (63 sq mi)
- Population (1999): 7,689
  - Density: 47.2/km^{2} (122/sq mi)

The Communauté de communes du canton de Roisel is a former communauté de communes in the Somme département and in the Picardie région of France. It was created in December 1994. It was merged into the Communauté de communes de la Haute Somme in 2013.

== Composition ==
This Communauté de communes comprised 22 communes:

1. Aizecourt-le-Bas
2. Bernes
3. Driencourt
4. Épehy
5. Fins
6. Guyencourt-Saulcourt
7. Hancourt
8. Hervilly
9. Hesbécourt
10. Heudicourt
11. Liéramont
12. Longavesnes
13. Marquaix
14. Pœuilly
15. Roisel
16. Ronssoy
17. Sorel
18. Templeux-la-Fosse
19. Templeux-le-Guérard
20. Tincourt-Boucly
21. Villers-Faucon
22. Vraignes-en-Vermandois

== See also ==
- Communes of the Somme department
