= Canton of Combles =

Coordinates: 50°0′36″N 2°51′58″E

Combles
- Former canton
- Interactive map of Combles
- Country: France
- Region: Hauts-de-France
- Department: Somme
- No. of communes: {{{nbcomm}}}
- Disbanded: 2015
- Area: 126.16 km^{2} (48.71 sq mi)
- Population (2012): 4,422
  - Density: 35.05/km^{2} (90.78/sq mi)

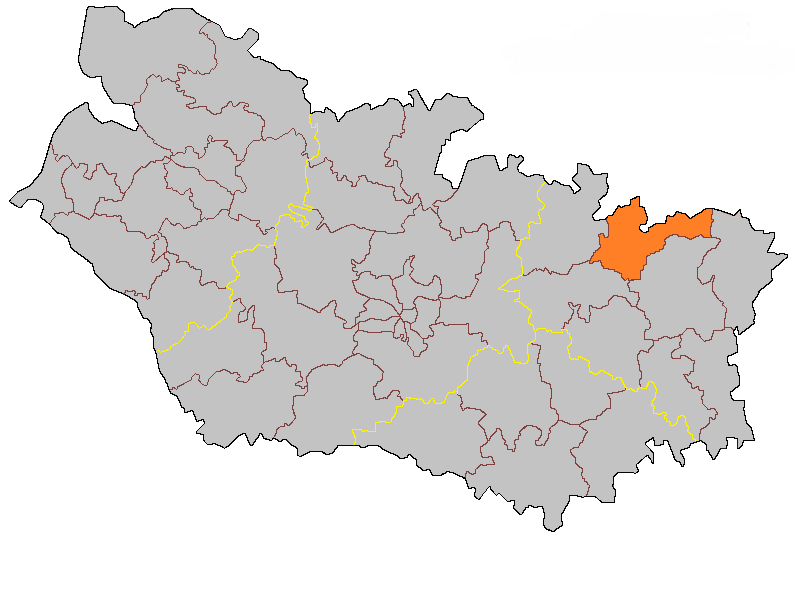
Cnt de Combles.png

The Canton of Combles is a former canton situated in the department of the Somme and in the Picardie region of northern France. It was disbanded following the French canton reorganisation which came into effect in March 2015. It had 4,422 inhabitants (2012).

== Geography ==
The canton is organised around the commune of Combles in the arrondissement of Péronne. The altitude varies from 42 m (Curlu) à 157 m (Ginchy) for an average of 104m.

The canton comprised 19 communes:

- Carnoy
- Combles
- Curlu
- Équancourt
- Étricourt-Manancourt
- Flers
- Ginchy
- Gueudecourt
- Guillemont
- Hardecourt-aux-Bois
- Hem-Monacu
- Lesbœufs
- Longueval
- Maricourt
- Maurepas
- Mesnil-en-Arrouaise
- Montauban-de-Picardie
- Rancourt
- Sailly-Saillisel

== Population ==
Population Growth
1962	1968	1975	1982	1990	1999
4352	4569	4050	3886	3807	3780
Census count starting from 1962 : Population without double counting

== See also ==
- Arrondissements of the Somme department
- Cantons of the Somme department
- Communes of the Somme department
