= Communauté de communes du canton de Combles =

Coordinates: 50.01026°N 2.8648°E

canton de Combles
- Former communauté de communes
- Interactive map of canton de Combles
- Country: France
- Region: Hauts-de-France
- Department: Somme
- No. of communes: {{{nbcomm}}}
- Established: 1993
- Disbanded: 2013

The communauté de communes du canton de Combles is a former communauté de communes in the Somme département and in the Picardie region of France. It was created in December 1993. It was merged into the Communauté de communes de la Haute Somme in 2013.

== Composition ==
This Communauté de communes comprised 19 communes:

1. Carnoy
2. Combles
3. Curlu
4. Équancourt
5. Étricourt-Manancourt
6. Flers
7. Ginchy
8. Gueudecourt
9. Guillemont
10. Hardecourt-aux-Bois
11. Hem-Monacu
12. Lesbœufs
13. Longueval
14. Maricourt
15. Maurepas
16. Mesnil-en-Arrouaise
17. Montauban-de-Picardie
18. Rancourt
19. Sailly-Saillisel

== See also ==
- Communes of the Somme department
