= Arrondissement of Péronne =

Coordinates: 49.93°N 2.93°E

Péronne
- Arrondissement
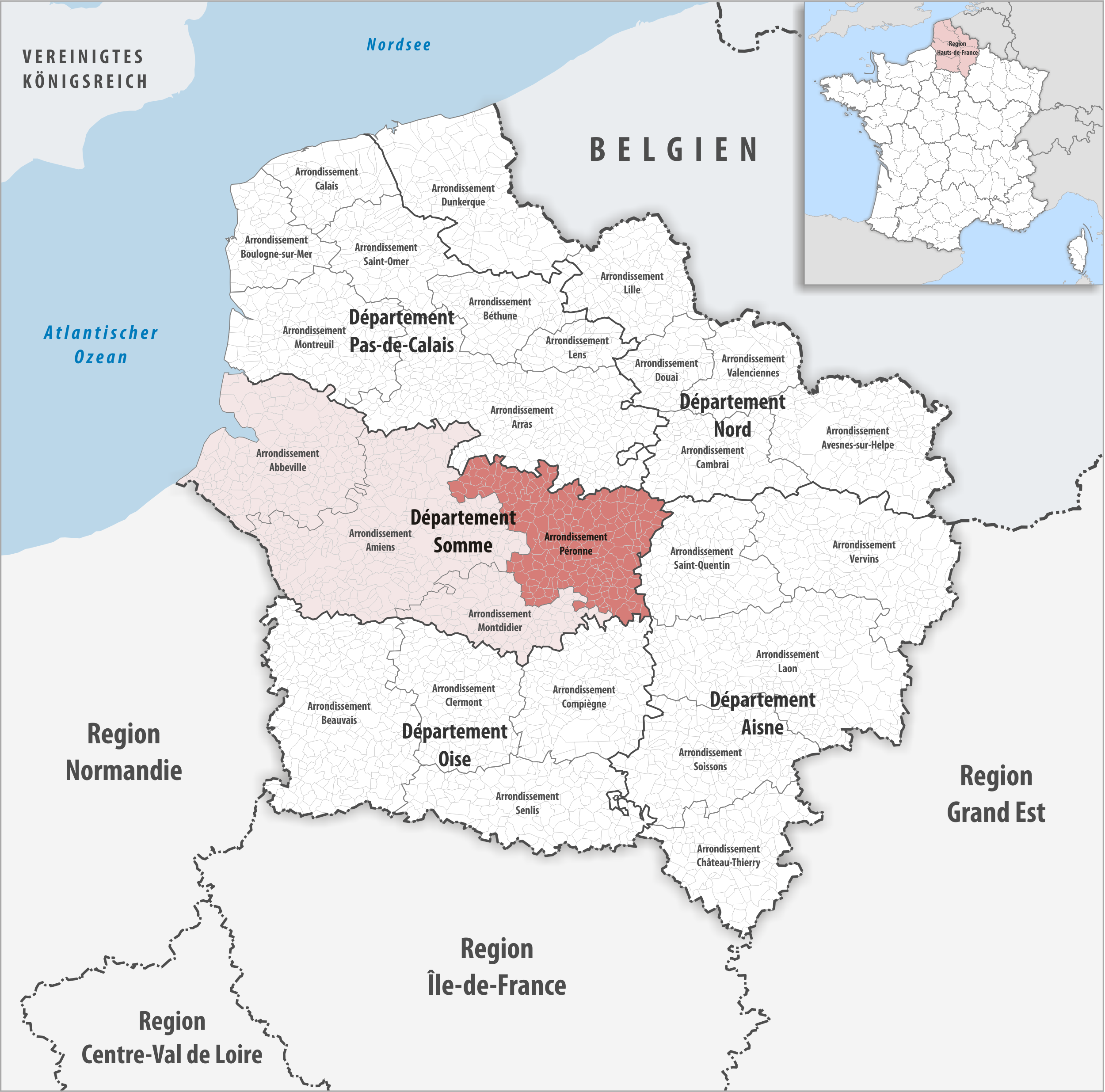
- Location within the region Hauts-de-France
- Country: France
- Region: Hauts-de-France
- Department: Somme
- No. of communes: {{{nbcomm}}}
- Area: 1,484.6 km^{2} (573.2 sq mi)
- Population (2023): 91,633
  - Density: 61.722/km^{2} (159.86/sq mi)
- INSEE code: 804

The arrondissement of Péronne is an arrondissement of France in the Somme department in the Hauts-de-France region. It has 208 communes. Its population is 92,535 (2021), and its area is 1,484.6 km^{2} (573.2 sq mi).

== Composition ==
The communes of the arrondissement of Péronne, and their INSEE codes, are:

1. Ablaincourt-Pressoir (80002)
2. Acheux-en-Amiénois (80003)
3. Aizecourt-le-Bas (80014)
4. Aizecourt-le-Haut (80015)
5. Albert (80016)
6. Allaines (80017)
7. Arquèves (80028)
8. Assevillers (80033)
9. Athies (80034)
10. Auchonvillers (80038)
11. Authie (80043)
12. Authuille (80045)
13. Aveluy (80047)
14. Barleux (80054)
15. Bayencourt (80057)
16. Bayonvillers (80058)
17. Bazentin (80059)
18. Beaucourt-sur-l'Ancre (80065)
19. Beaufort-en-Santerre (80067)
20. Beaumont-Hamel (80069)
21. Bécordel-Bécourt (80073)
22. Belloy-en-Santerre (80080)
23. Bernes (80088)
24. Berny-en-Santerre (80090)
25. Bertrancourt (80095)
26. Béthencourt-sur-Somme (80097)
27. Biaches (80102)
28. Billancourt (80105)
29. Bouchavesnes-Bergen (80115)
30. Bouchoir (80116)
31. Bouvincourt-en-Vermandois (80128)
32. Bouzincourt (80129)
33. Bray-sur-Somme (80136)
34. Breuil (80139)
35. Brie (80141)
36. Brouchy (80144)
37. Buire-Courcelles (80150)
38. Buire-sur-l'Ancre (80151)
39. Bus-lès-Artois (80153)
40. Bussu (80154)
41. Buverchy (80158)
42. Caix (80162)
43. Cappy (80172)
44. Carnoy-Mametz (80505)
45. Cartigny (80177)
46. Chaulnes (80186)
47. La Chavatte (80189)
48. Chilly (80191)
49. Chuignes (80194)
50. Chuignolles (80195)
51. Cizancourt (80197)
52. Cléry-sur-Somme (80199)
53. Coigneux (80201)
54. Colincamps (80203)
55. Combles (80204)
56. Contalmaison (80206)
57. Courcelette (80216)
58. Courcelles-au-Bois (80217)
59. Croix-Moligneaux (80226)
60. Curchy (80230)
61. Curlu (80231)
62. Dernancourt (80238)
63. Devise (80239)
64. Doingt (80240)
65. Dompierre-Becquincourt (80247)
66. Douilly (80252)
67. Driencourt (80258)
68. Éclusier-Vaux (80264)
69. Englebelmer (80266)
70. Ennemain (80267)
71. Épehy (80271)
72. Épénancourt (80272)
73. Eppeville (80274)
74. Équancourt (80275)
75. Esmery-Hallon (80284)
76. Estrées-Deniécourt (80288)
77. Estrées-Mons (80557)
78. Éterpigny (80294)
79. Étinehem-Méricourt (80295)
80. Étricourt-Manancourt (80298)
81. Falvy (80300)
82. Fay (80304)
83. Feuillères (80307)
84. Fins (80312)
85. Flaucourt (80313)
86. Flers (80314)
87. Folies (80320)
88. Fontaine-lès-Cappy (80325)
89. Forceville (80329)
90. Foucaucourt-en-Santerre (80335)
91. Fouquescourt (80339)
92. Framerville-Rainecourt (80342)
93. Fransart (80347)
94. Fresnes-Mazancourt (80353)
95. Fricourt (80366)
96. Frise (80367)
97. Ginchy (80378)
98. Grandcourt (80384)
99. Gueudecourt (80397)
100. Guillaucourt (80400)
101. Guillemont (80401)
102. Guyencourt-Saulcourt (80404)
103. Hallu (80409)
104. Ham (80410)
105. Hancourt (80413)
106. Harbonnières (80417)
107. Hardecourt-aux-Bois (80418)
108. Harponville (80420)
109. Hédauville (80425)
110. Hem-Monacu (80428)
111. Herbécourt (80430)
112. Hérissart (80431)
113. Herleville (80432)
114. Hervilly (80434)
115. Hesbécourt (80435)
116. Heudicourt (80438)
117. Hombleux (80442)
118. Hypercourt (80621)
119. Irles (80451)
120. Languevoisin-Quiquery (80465)
121. Laviéville (80468)
122. Léalvillers (80470)
123. Lesbœufs (80472)
124. Licourt (80474)
125. Liéramont (80475)
126. Lihons (80481)
127. Longavesnes (80487)
128. Longueval (80490)
129. Louvencourt (80493)
130. Mailly-Maillet (80498)
131. Marchélepot-Misery (80509)
132. Maricourt (80513)
133. Marieux (80514)
134. Marquaix (80516)
135. Matigny (80519)
136. Maucourt (80520)
137. Maurepas (80521)
138. Méaulte (80523)
139. Méharicourt (80524)
140. Mesnil-Bruntel (80536)
141. Mesnil-en-Arrouaise (80538)
142. Mesnil-Martinsart (80540)
143. Mesnil-Saint-Nicaise (80542)
144. Millencourt (80547)
145. Miraumont (80549)
146. Moislains (80552)
147. Monchy-Lagache (80555)
148. Montauban-de-Picardie (80560)
149. Morchain (80568)
150. Morlancourt (80572)
151. Moyencourt (80576)
152. Muille-Villette (80579)
153. Nesle (80585)
154. La Neuville-lès-Bray (80593)
155. Nurlu (80601)
156. Offoy (80605)
157. Ovillers-la-Boisselle (80615)
158. Pargny (80616)
159. Parvillers-le-Quesnoy (80617)
160. Péronne (80620)
161. Pœuilly (80629)
162. Potte (80638)
163. Pozières (80640)
164. Proyart (80644)
165. Puchevillers (80645)
166. Punchy (80646)
167. Puzeaux (80647)
168. Pys (80648)
169. Quivières (80658)
170. Raincheval (80659)
171. Rancourt (80664)
172. Rethonvillers (80669)
173. Roisel (80677)
174. Ronssoy (80679)
175. Rosières-en-Santerre (80680)
176. Rouvroy-en-Santerre (80682)
177. Rouy-le-Grand (80683)
178. Rouy-le-Petit (80684)
179. Sailly-Saillisel (80695)
180. Saint-Christ-Briost (80701)
181. Saint-Léger-lès-Authie (80705)
182. Sancourt (80726)
183. Senlis-le-Sec (80733)
184. Sorel (80737)
185. Soyécourt (80741)
186. Suzanne (80743)
187. Templeux-la-Fosse (80747)
188. Templeux-le-Guérard (80748)
189. Tertry (80750)
190. Thiepval (80753)
191. Thièvres (80756)
192. Tincourt-Boucly (80762)
193. Toutencourt (80766)
194. Ugny-l'Équipée (80771)
195. Varennes (80776)
196. Vauchelles-lès-Authie (80777)
197. Vauvillers (80781)
198. Vermandovillers (80789)
199. Villecourt (80794)
200. Villers-Carbonnel (80801)
201. Villers-Faucon (80802)
202. Ville-sur-Ancre (80807)
203. Voyennes (80811)
204. Vraignes-en-Vermandois (80812)
205. Vrély (80814)
206. Warvillers (80823)
207. Wiencourt-l'Équipée (80824)
208. Y (80829)

== History ==
The arrondissement of Péronne was created in 1800. At the January 2017 reorganisation of the arrondissements of Somme, it received 28 communes from the arrondissement of Amiens and 26 communes from the arrondissement of Montdidier, and it lost seven communes to the arrondissement of Amiens.

As a result of the reorganisation of the cantons of France which came into effect in 2015, the borders of the cantons are no longer related to the borders of the arrondissements. The cantons of the arrondissement of Péronne were, as of January 2015:

1. Albert
2. Bray-sur-Somme
3. Chaulnes
4. Combles
5. Ham
6. Nesle
7. Péronne
8. Roisel
