= Communauté de communes de la Haute Somme =

Federation of municipalities in France

Coordinates: 49.93°N 2.93°E

Haute Somme
- Communauté de communes
- Interactive map of Haute Somme
- Country: France
- Region: Hauts-de-France
- Department: Somme
- No. of communes: {{{nbcomm}}}
- Area: 462.8 km^{2} (178.7 sq mi)
- Population (2018): 27,253
  - Density: 58.89/km^{2} (152.5/sq mi)
- Website: www.coeurhautesomme.fr

The Communauté de communes de la Haute Somme is a communauté de communes in the Somme département and in the Hauts-de-France région of France. Its seat is in Péronne. Its area is 462.8 km^{2}, and its population was 27,253 in 2018.

== Composition ==
Since 2013, when it merged with the former Communauté de communes du canton de Combles and the Communauté de communes du canton de Roisel, it consists of 60 communes:

1. Aizecourt-le-Bas
2. Aizecourt-le-Haut
3. Allaines
4. Barleux
5. Bernes
6. Biaches
7. Bouchavesnes-Bergen
8. Bouvincourt-en-Vermandois
9. Brie
10. Buire-Courcelles
11. Bussu
12. Cartigny
13. Cléry-sur-Somme
14. Combles
15. Devise
16. Doingt
17. Driencourt
18. Épehy
19. Équancourt
20. Estrées-Mons
21. Éterpigny
22. Étricourt-Manancourt
23. Feuillères
24. Fins
25. Flaucourt
26. Flers
27. Ginchy
28. Gueudecourt
29. Guillemont
30. Guyencourt-Saulcourt
31. Hancourt
32. Hardecourt-aux-Bois
33. Hem-Monacu
34. Herbécourt
35. Hervilly
36. Hesbécourt
37. Heudicourt
38. Lesbœufs
39. Liéramont
40. Longavesnes
41. Longueval
42. Marquaix
43. Maurepas
44. Mesnil-Bruntel
45. Mesnil-en-Arrouaise
46. Moislains
47. Nurlu
48. Péronne
49. Pœuilly
50. Rancourt
51. Roisel
52. Ronssoy
53. Sailly-Saillisel
54. Sorel
55. Templeux-la-Fosse
56. Templeux-le-Guérard
57. Tincourt-Boucly
58. Villers-Carbonnel
59. Villers-Faucon
60. Vraignes-en-Vermandois

== See also ==
- Communes of the Somme department
