= Devise, Somme =

Devise
- Commune
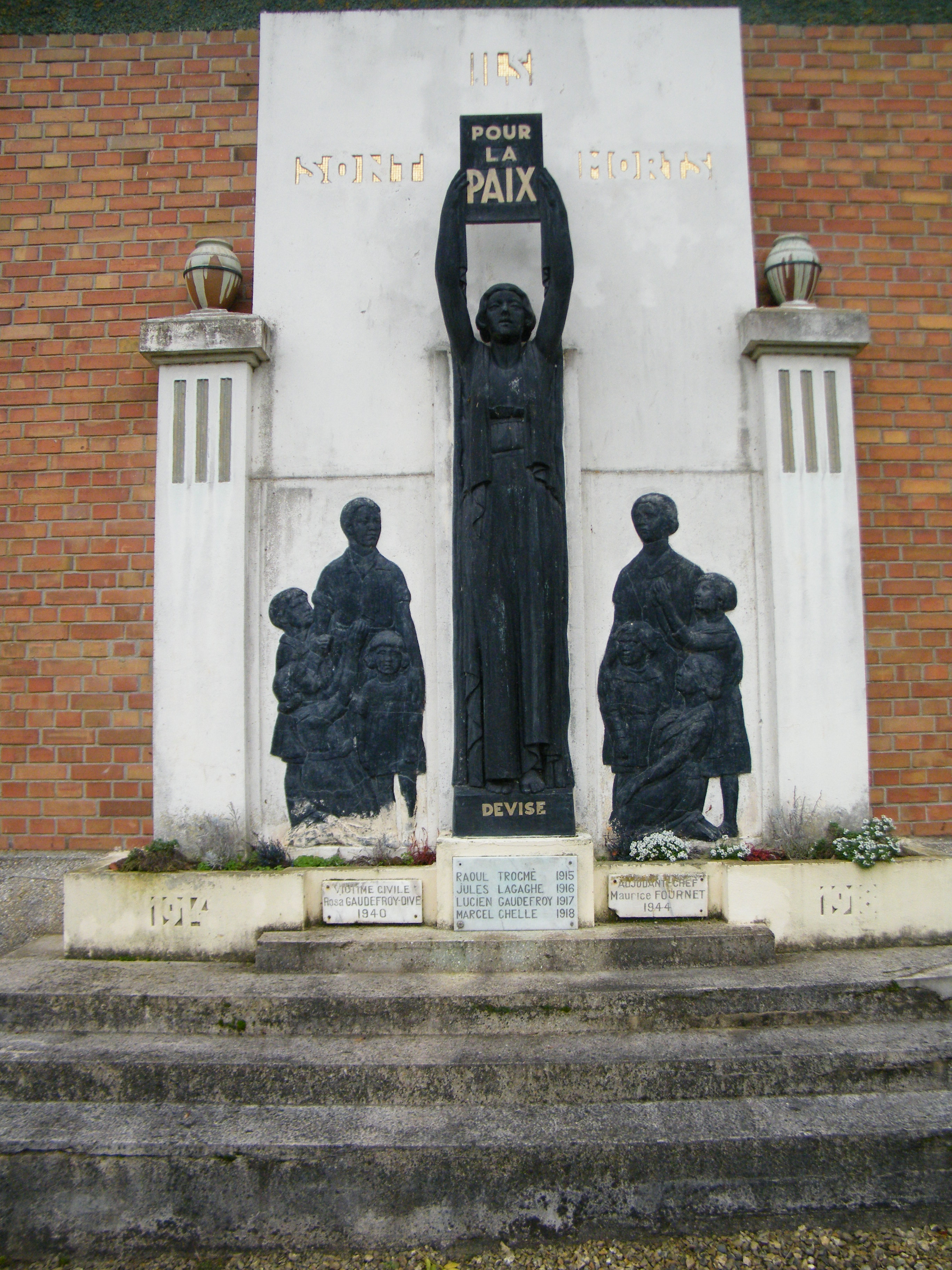
- The monument to the dead
- Location of Devise
- Location within France Location within Hauts-de-France
- Coordinates: 49°51′29″N 3°00′19″E
- Country: France
- Region: Hauts-de-France
- Department: Somme
- Arrondissement: Péronne
- Canton: Péronne
- Intercommunality: Haute Somme

Government
  - Mayor (2020–2026): Florence Brunel
- Area^{1}: 2.75 km^{2} (1.06 sq mi)
- Elevation: 63 m (207 ft)
- Highest elevation: 92 m (302 ft)
- Lowest elevation: 54 m (177 ft)
- Population (2023): 59
  - Density: 21/km^{2} (56/sq mi)
- Time zone: UTC+01:00 (CET)
  - Summer (DST): UTC+02:00 (CEST)
- INSEE/Postal code: 80239 /80200
- ^{1} French Land Register data, which excludes lakes, ponds, glaciers > 1 km^{2} (0.386 sq mi or 247 acres) and river estuaries.

Devise (French pronunciation: [dəviz]) is a commune in the Somme department in Hauts-de-France in northern France.

== Geography ==
Devise is situated on the D45 road, on the banks of the Omignon, a tributary of the river Somme, some 14 miles (23 km) west of Saint-Quentin.

== Population ==
Historical population
Year	Pop.	±% p.a.
1968	91	—
1975	64	−4.90%
1982	60	−0.92%
1990	69	+1.76%
1999	76	+1.08%
2007	62	−2.51%
2012	48	−4.99%
2017	50	+0.82%
2023	59	+2.80%
Source: INSEE

== See also ==
- Communes of the Somme department
