= Herbécourt =

- Commune
- Location of Herbécourt
- Location within France Location within Hauts-de-France
- Coordinates: 49°55′21″N 2°50′32″E
- Country: France
- Region: Hauts-de-France
- Department: Somme
- Arrondissement: Péronne
- Canton: Péronne
- Intercommunality: CC Haute Somme

Government
  - Mayor (2020–2026): Jacques Vanoye
- Area^{1}: 4.5 km^{2} (1.7 sq mi)
- Elevation: 105 m (344 ft)
- Highest elevation: 98 m (322 ft)
- Lowest elevation: 69 m (226 ft)
- Population (2023): 178
  - Density: 40/km^{2} (100/sq mi)
- Time zone: UTC+01:00 (CET)
  - Summer (DST): UTC+02:00 (CEST)
- INSEE/Postal code: 80430 /80200
- ^{1} French Land Register data, which excludes lakes, ponds, glaciers > 1 km^{2} (0.386 sq mi or 247 acres) and river estuaries.

Herbécourt (French pronunciation: [ɛʁbekuʁ]) is a commune in the Somme department in Hauts-de-France in northern France.

== Geography ==
The commune is situated on the D1 road, 32 kilometres (20 mi) northwest of Saint-Quentin, alongside the A1 autoroute.

== Population ==
Historical population
Year	Pop.	±% p.a.
1968	211	—
1975	174	−2.72%
1982	134	−3.66%
1990	149	+1.34%
1999	133	−1.25%
2007	172	+3.27%
2012	201	+3.17%
2017	224	+2.19%
2023	178	−3.76%
Source: INSEE

== See also ==
- Communes of the Somme department
