= Estrées-Mons =

- Commune
- Location of Estrées-Mons
- Location within France Location within Hauts-de-France
- Coordinates: 49°52′44″N 3°00′27″E
- Country: France
- Region: Hauts-de-France
- Department: Somme
- Arrondissement: Péronne
- Canton: Péronne
- Intercommunality: Haute Somme

Government
  - Mayor (2020–2026): Christian Picard
- Area^{1}: 15.3 km^{2} (5.9 sq mi)
- Elevation: 85 m (279 ft)
- Highest elevation: 102 m (335 ft)
- Lowest elevation: 56 m (184 ft)
- Population (2023): 594
  - Density: 38.8/km^{2} (101/sq mi)
- Time zone: UTC+01:00 (CET)
  - Summer (DST): UTC+02:00 (CEST)
- INSEE/Postal code: 80557 /80200
- ^{1} French Land Register data, which excludes lakes, ponds, glaciers > 1 km^{2} (0.386 sq mi or 247 acres) and river estuaries.

Estrées-Mons (Picard: Étrée-Mon) is a commune in the Somme department in Hauts-de-France in northern France. The municipality was formed in 1973 from the merger of Estrées-en-Chaussée and Mons-en-Chaussée.

It is one of many villages in the north of France bearing the name Estrées. The etymology of the name is from strata (cognate of English "street"), the word for the stone-layered Roman roads in the area (some of which turned into modern highways). Hence Estreti, village on the road which developed into Estrées.

== Geography ==
The commune is situated on the N29 road, 16 kilometres (10 mi) west-northwest of Saint-Quentin.

== Population ==
Historical population
Year	Pop.	±% p.a.
1968	597	—
1975	628	+0.73%
1982	631	+0.07%
1990	596	−0.71%
1999	609	+0.24%
2007	573	−0.76%
2012	564	−0.32%
2017	606	+1.45%
2023	594	−0.33%
Source: INSEE

== See also ==
- Communes of the Somme department
