= Fins, Somme =

Fins
- Commune
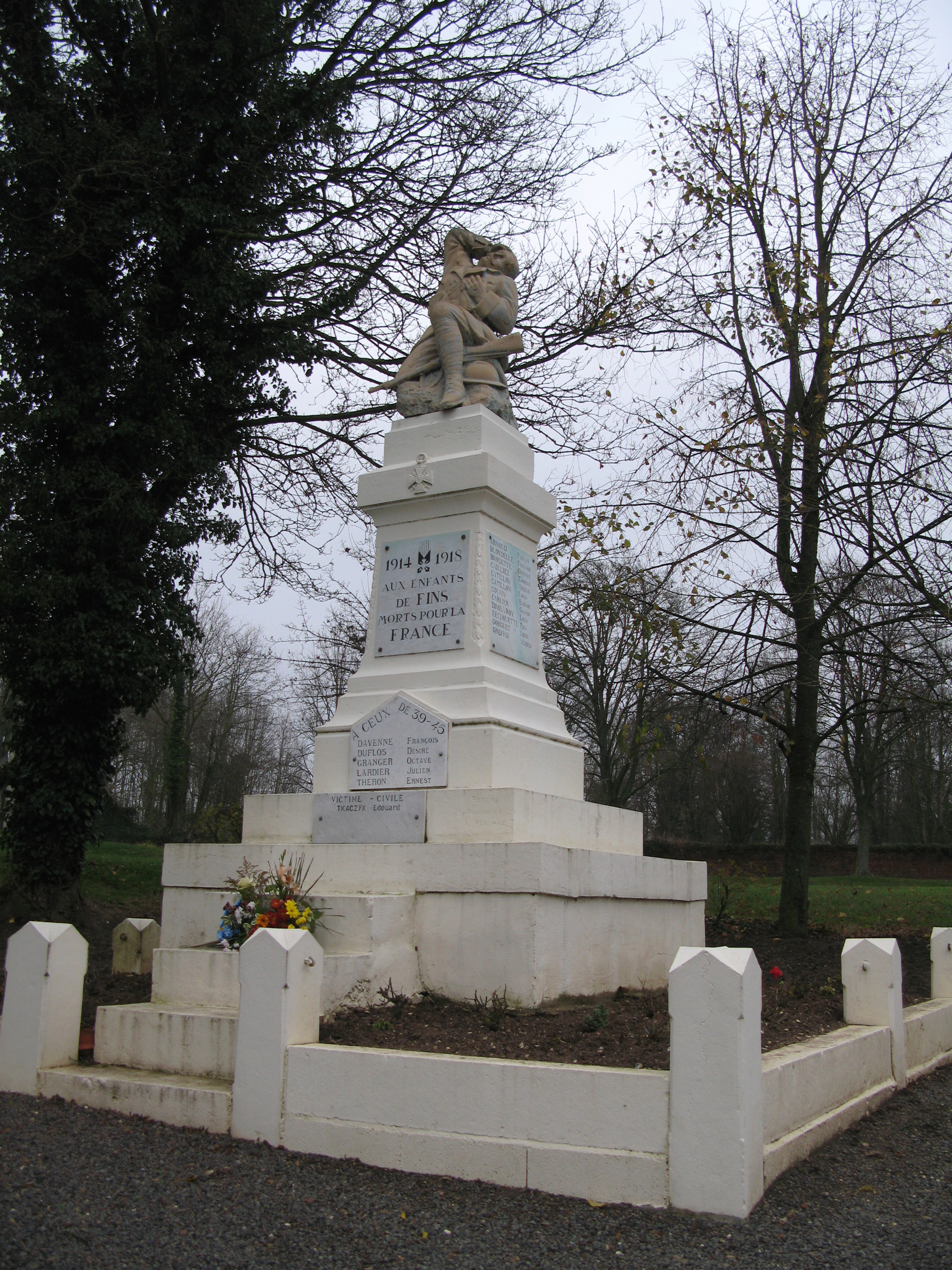
- The war memorial in Fins
- Location of Fins
- Location within France Location within Hauts-de-France
- Coordinates: 50°02′08″N 3°02′34″E
- Country: France
- Region: Hauts-de-France
- Department: Somme
- Arrondissement: Péronne
- Canton: Péronne
- Intercommunality: Haute Somme

Government
  - Mayor (2020–2026): Daniel Decodts
- Area^{1}: 6.87 km^{2} (2.65 sq mi)
- Elevation: 103 m (338 ft)
- Highest elevation: 138 m (453 ft)
- Lowest elevation: 93 m (305 ft)
- Population (2023): 278
  - Density: 40.5/km^{2} (105/sq mi)
- Time zone: UTC+01:00 (CET)
  - Summer (DST): UTC+02:00 (CEST)
- INSEE/Postal code: 80312 /80360
- ^{1} French Land Register data, which excludes lakes, ponds, glaciers > 1 km^{2} (0.386 sq mi or 247 acres) and river estuaries.

Fins is a commune in the Somme department in Hauts-de-France in northern France.

== Geography ==
Fins is situated at the intersection of the D917 and D58 crossroads, near the border with the Pas-de-Calais département, approximately 20 miles (32 km) northwest of Saint-Quentin.

Nearby is the Fins New British Cemetery from World War One.

== Population ==
Historical population
Year	Pop.	±% p.a.
1968	313	—
1975	296	−0.79%
1982	258	−1.94%
1990	243	−0.75%
1999	257	+0.62%
2007	270	+0.62%
2012	286	+1.16%
2017	277	−0.64%
2023	278	+0.06%
Source: INSEE

== See also ==
- Communes of the Somme department
