= Ginchy =

- Commune
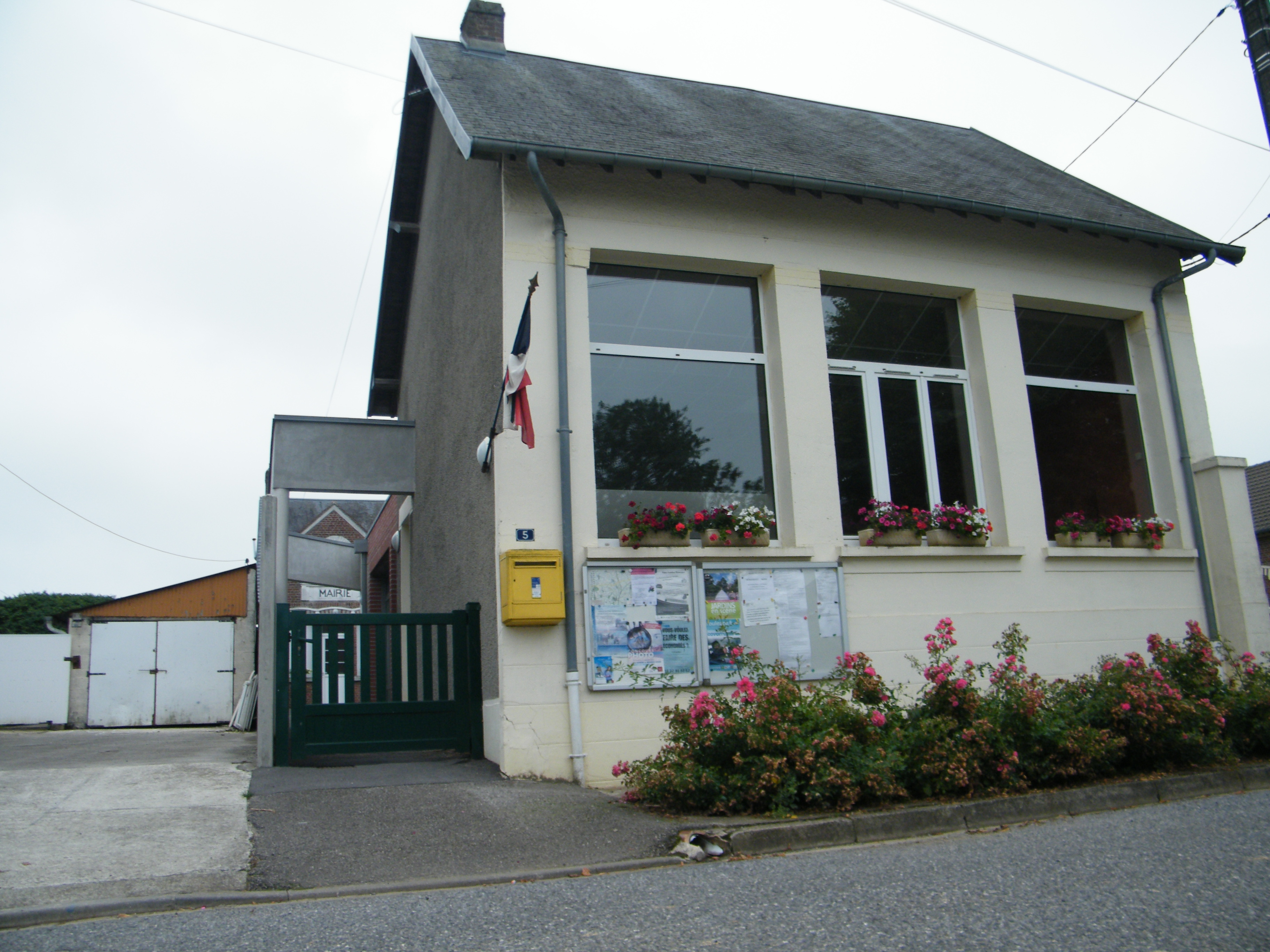
- The town hall in Ginchy
- Location of Ginchy
- Location within France Location within Hauts-de-France
- Coordinates: 50°01′27″N 2°49′59″E
- Country: France
- Region: Hauts-de-France
- Department: Somme
- Arrondissement: Péronne
- Canton: Péronne
- Intercommunality: Haute Somme

Government
  - Mayor (2020–2026): Jean-Marc Delmotte
- Area^{1}: 5.92 km^{2} (2.29 sq mi)
- Elevation: 154 m (505 ft)
- Highest elevation: 157 m (515 ft)
- Lowest elevation: 85 m (279 ft)
- Population (2023): 75
  - Density: 13/km^{2} (33/sq mi)
- Time zone: UTC+01:00 (CET)
  - Summer (DST): UTC+02:00 (CEST)
- INSEE/Postal code: 80378 /80360
- ^{1} French Land Register data, which excludes lakes, ponds, glaciers > 1 km^{2} (0.386 sq mi or 247 acres) and river estuaries.

Ginchy (French pronunciation: [ʒɛ̃ʃi]) is a commune in the Somme department in Hauts-de-France in northern France.

== Geography ==
Ginchy is situated on the D20 road, some 45 km (28 mi) northeast of Amiens. The graphic below shows the community in relation to nearby places.

Relative distance from neighbouring populations

== History ==
Ginchy has a small park devoted to the memory of Captain Charles François, "Dromedary of Egypt" (1775-1853), who husbanded the camels during Napoleon's French campaign in Egypt and Syria.

Ginchy was at the centre of battle during World War I (1914-1918) and suffered severe damage as a result. It was used as an observation post by the Germans and was fiercely contested before being overtaken by Irish troops to conclude the Battle of Ginchy.

== Population ==
Historical population
Year	Pop.	±% p.a.
1968	86	—
1975	69	−3.10%
1982	64	−1.07%
1990	60	−0.80%
1999	56	−0.76%
2007	66	+2.08%
2012	69	+0.89%
2017	61	−2.43%
2023	75	+3.50%
Source: INSEE

== See also ==
- Communes of the Somme department
- Battle of Ginchy
