= Sailly-Saillisel =

- Commune
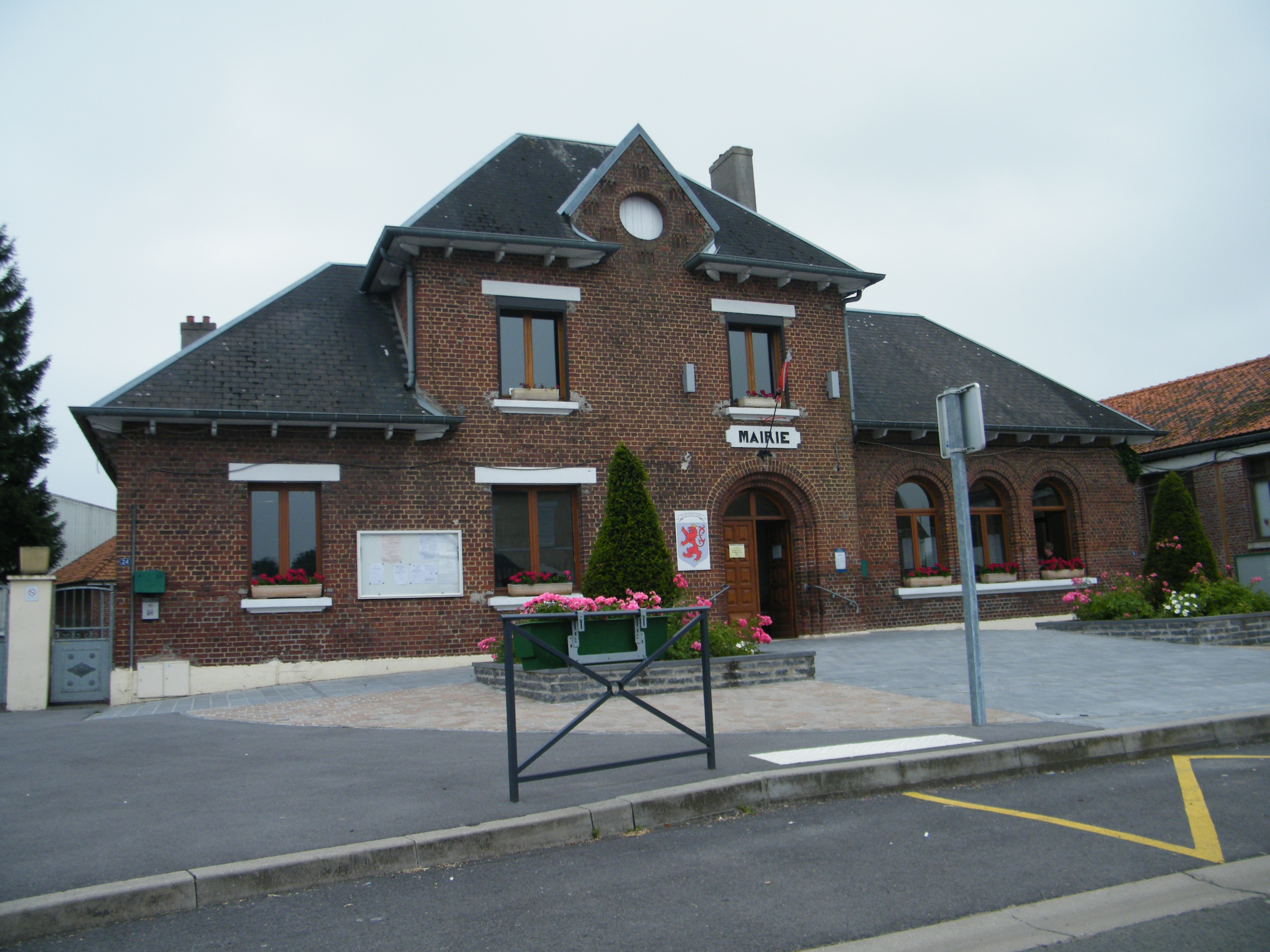
- The town hall and school in Sailly-Saillisel

- Coat of arms
- Location of Sailly-Saillisel
- Location within France Location within Hauts-de-France
- Coordinates: 50°01′53″N 2°54′50″E
- Country: France
- Region: Hauts-de-France
- Department: Somme
- Arrondissement: Péronne
- Canton: Péronne
- Intercommunality: Haute Somme

Government
  - Mayor (2020–2026): Gérard Parsy
- Area^{1}: 9.39 km^{2} (3.63 sq mi)
- Elevation: 156 m (512 ft)
- Highest elevation: 157 m (515 ft)
- Lowest elevation: 108 m (354 ft)
- Population (2023): 469
  - Density: 49.9/km^{2} (129/sq mi)
- Time zone: UTC+01:00 (CET)
  - Summer (DST): UTC+02:00 (CEST)
- INSEE/Postal code: 80695 /80360
- ^{1} French Land Register data, which excludes lakes, ponds, glaciers > 1 km^{2} (0.386 sq mi or 247 acres) and river estuaries.

Sailly-Saillisel (French pronunciation: [saji sajizɛl]) is a commune in the Somme department in Hauts-de-France in northern France.

== Geography ==
The commune is situated some 33 miles (53 km) northeast of Amiens, on the N17 and D172 roads, close to the border with the Pas-de-Calais.

== History ==
- Theatre of operations of the Battle of Bapaume during the Franco-Prussian War of 1870–71.
- Theatre of operations of the Battle of the Somme during the First World War of 1914–1918.

== Population ==
Historical population
Year	Pop.	±% p.a.
1968	382	—
1975	404	+0.80%
1982	404	+0.00%
1990	417	+0.40%
1999	410	−0.19%
2007	446	+1.06%
2012	483	+1.61%
2017	477	−0.25%
2023	469	−0.28%
Source: INSEE

== See also ==
- Communes of the Somme department
