= Rancourt, Somme =

Rancourt
- Commune
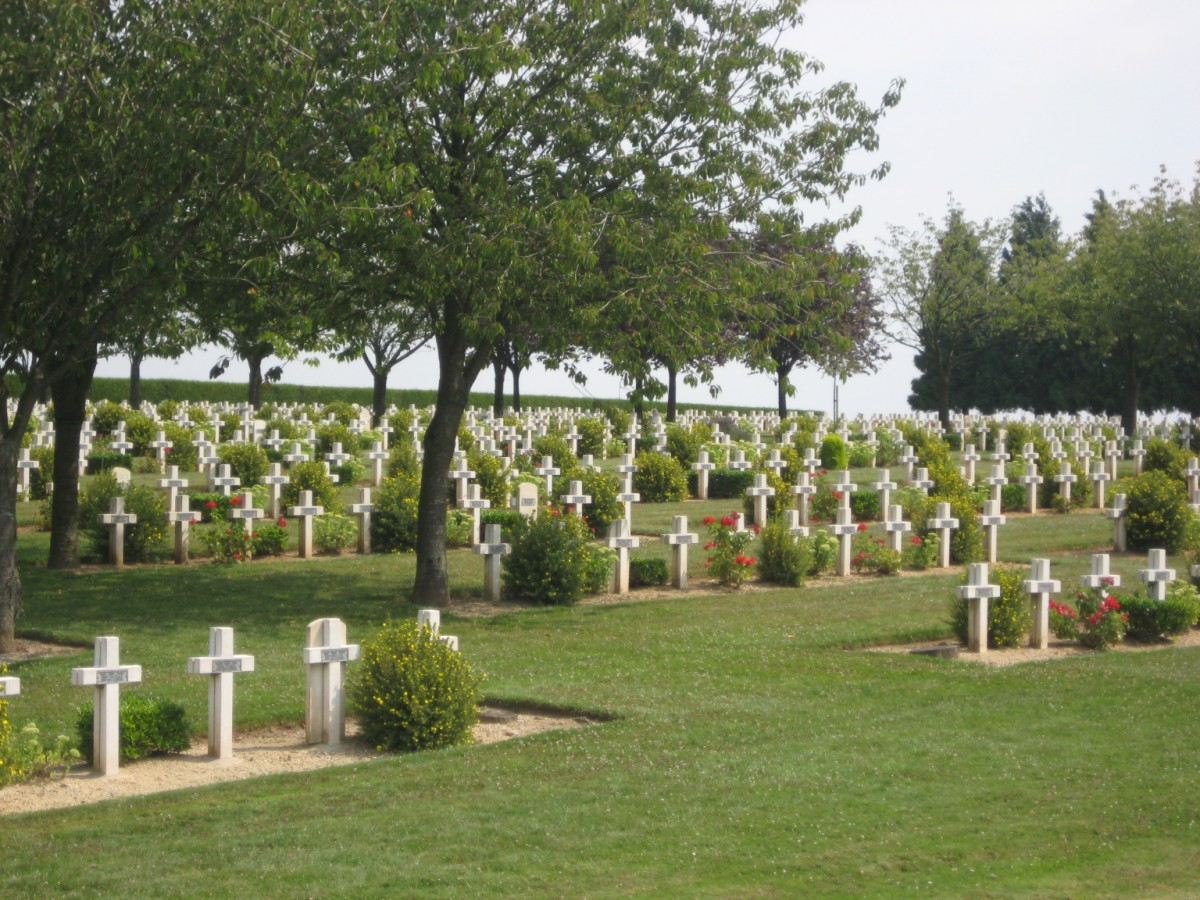
- The French war cemetery in Rancourt
- Location of Rancourt
- Location within France Location within Hauts-de-France
- Coordinates: 50°00′17″N 2°54′34″E
- Country: France
- Region: Hauts-de-France
- Department: Somme
- Arrondissement: Péronne
- Canton: Péronne
- Intercommunality: Haute Somme

Government
  - Mayor (2020–2026): Jean-Louis Cornaille
- Area^{1}: 2.91 km^{2} (1.12 sq mi)
- Elevation: 140 m (460 ft)
- Highest elevation: 151 m (495 ft)
- Lowest elevation: 109 m (358 ft)
- Population (2023): 188
  - Density: 64.6/km^{2} (167/sq mi)
- Time zone: UTC+01:00 (CET)
  - Summer (DST): UTC+02:00 (CEST)
- INSEE/Postal code: 80664 /80360
- ^{1} French Land Register data, which excludes lakes, ponds, glaciers > 1 km^{2} (0.386 sq mi or 247 acres) and river estuaries.

Rancourt (French pronunciation: [ʁɑ̃kuʁ]) is a commune in the Somme department in Hauts-de-France in northern France.

== Geography ==
Rancourt is situated 30 miles (48 km) northeast of Amiens, on the N17 road

== Population ==
Historical population
Year	Pop.	±% p.a.
1968	108	—
1975	113	+0.65%
1982	128	+1.80%
1990	143	+1.39%
1999	144	+0.08%
2007	176	+2.54%
2012	196	+2.18%
2017	198	+0.20%
2023	188	−0.86%
Source: INSEE

== See also ==
- Communes of the Somme department
