= Templeux-la-Fosse =

- Commune
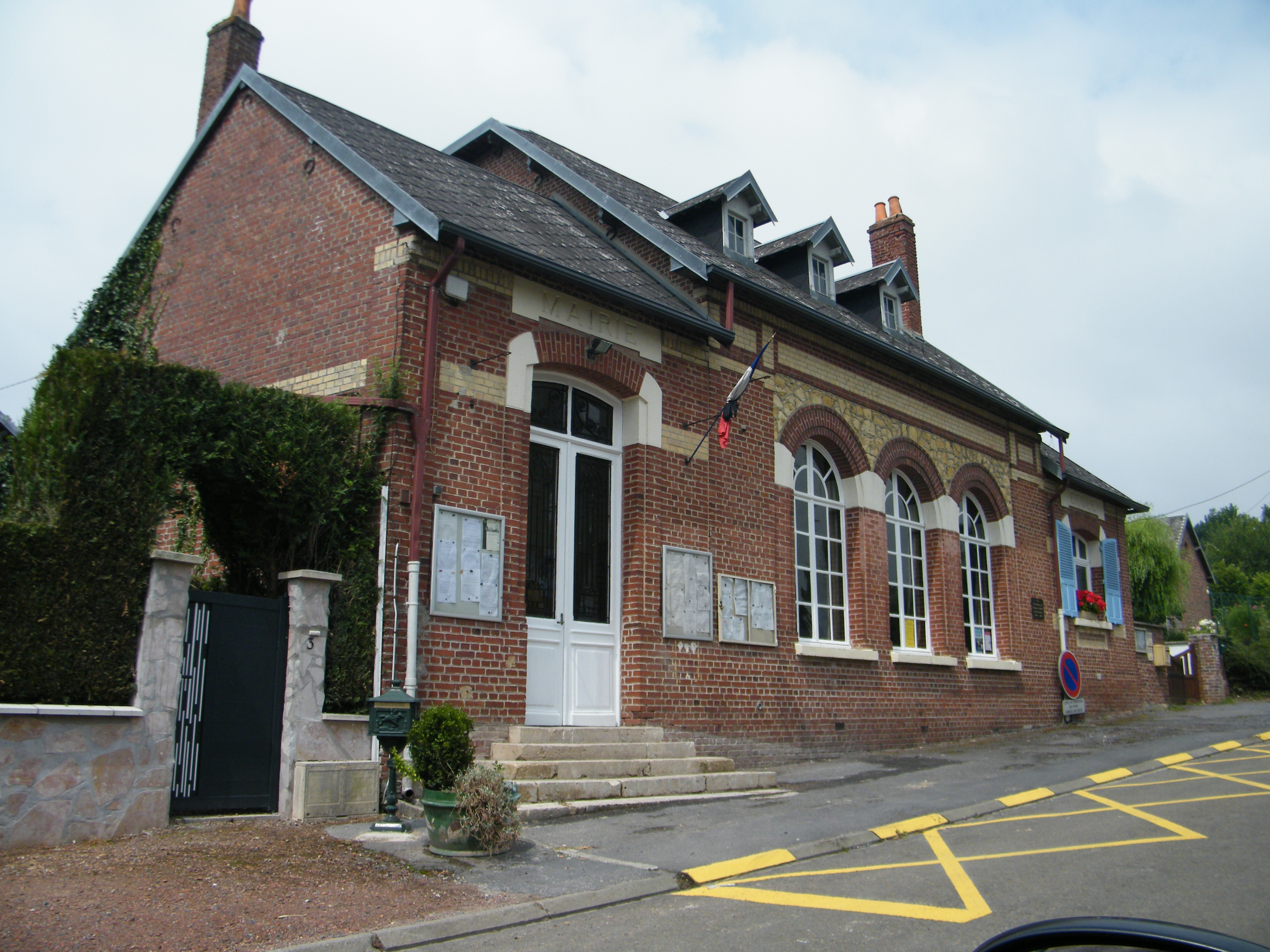
- The town hall and school in Templeux-la-Fosse
- Location of Templeux-la-Fosse
- Location within France Location within Hauts-de-France
- Coordinates: 49°58′05″N 3°01′34″E
- Country: France
- Region: Hauts-de-France
- Department: Somme
- Arrondissement: Péronne
- Canton: Péronne
- Intercommunality: Haute Somme

Government
  - Mayor (2020–2026): Benoît Mascré
- Area^{1}: 7.23 km^{2} (2.79 sq mi)
- Elevation: 100 m (330 ft)
- Highest elevation: 152 m (499 ft)
- Lowest elevation: 73 m (240 ft)
- Population (2023): 139
  - Density: 19.2/km^{2} (49.8/sq mi)
- Time zone: UTC+01:00 (CET)
  - Summer (DST): UTC+02:00 (CEST)
- INSEE/Postal code: 80747 /80240
- ^{1} French Land Register data, which excludes lakes, ponds, glaciers > 1 km^{2} (0.386 sq mi or 247 acres) and river estuaries.

Templeux-la-Fosse (French pronunciation: [tɑ̃plø la fos]; Picard: Timplu-l'Fosse) is a commune in the Somme department in Hauts-de-France in northern France.

== Geography ==
The commune is situated 30 miles (48 km) east of Amiens, on the D184 road

== Population ==
Historical population
Year	Pop.	±% p.a.
1968	199	—
1975	180	−1.42%
1982	179	−0.08%
1990	164	−1.09%
1999	171	+0.47%
2007	155	−1.22%
2012	143	−1.60%
2017	140	−0.42%
2023	139	−0.12%
Source: INSEE

== See also ==
- Communes of the Somme department
