= Bernes =

- Commune
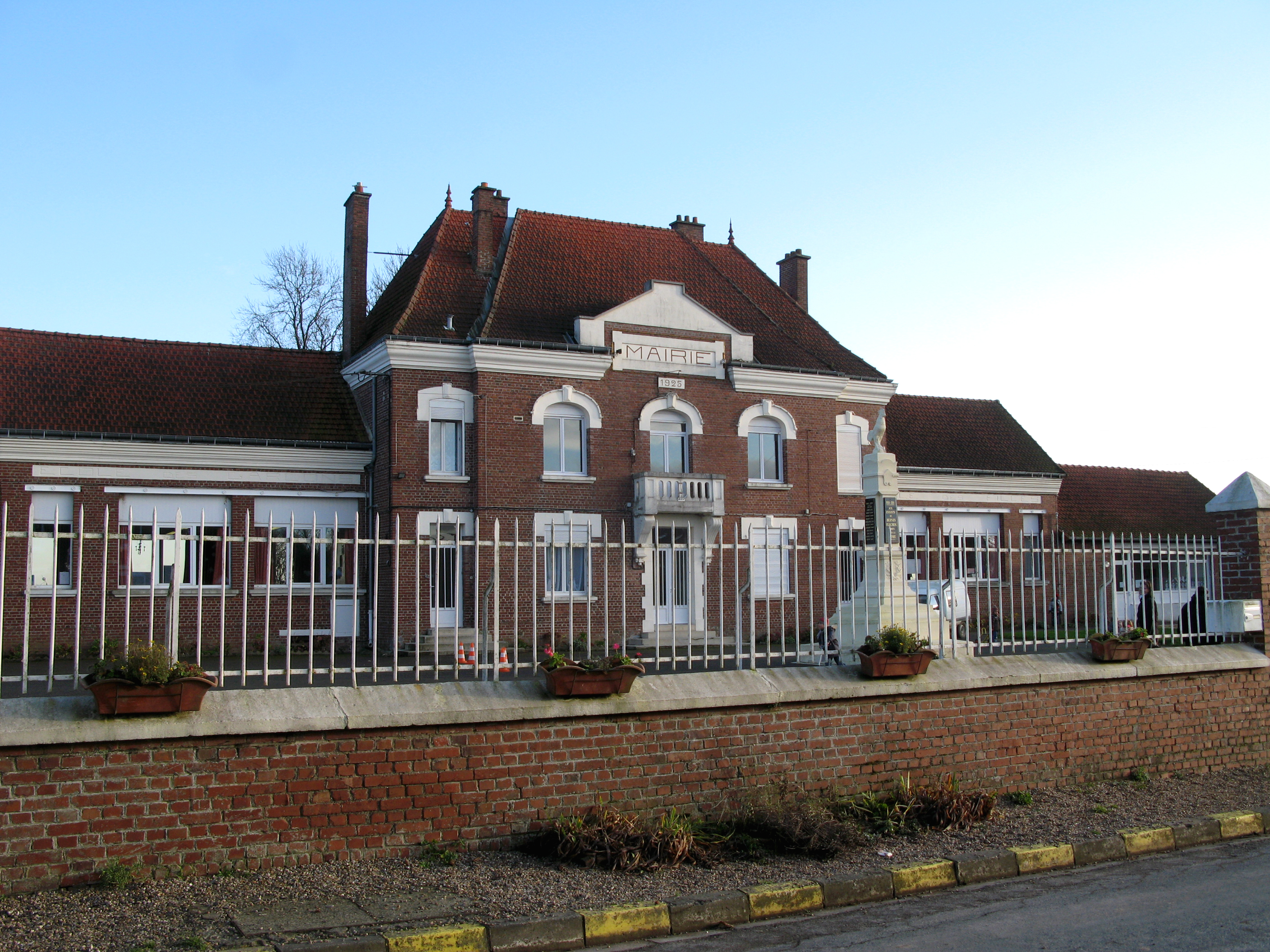
- The town hall in Bernes

- Coat of arms
- Location of Bernes
- Location within France Location within Hauts-de-France
- Coordinates: 49°54′35″N 3°05′58″E
- Country: France
- Region: Hauts-de-France
- Department: Somme
- Arrondissement: Péronne
- Canton: Péronne
- Intercommunality: Haute Somme

Government
  - Mayor (2020–2026): Jean Trujillo
- Area^{1}: 7.61 km^{2} (2.94 sq mi)
- Elevation: 115 m (377 ft)
- Highest elevation: 114 m (374 ft)
- Lowest elevation: 77 m (253 ft)
- Population (2023): 353
  - Density: 46.4/km^{2} (120/sq mi)
- Time zone: UTC+01:00 (CET)
  - Summer (DST): UTC+02:00 (CEST)
- INSEE/Postal code: 80088 /80240
- ^{1} French Land Register data, which excludes lakes, ponds, glaciers > 1 km^{2} (0.386 sq mi or 247 acres) and river estuaries.

Bernes (French pronunciation: [bɛʁn]) is a commune in the Somme department in Hauts-de-France in northern France.

== Geography ==
Bernes is situated on the junction of the D15 and D87 roads, some 10 miles (16 km) northwest of Saint-Quentin.

== Population ==
Historical population
Year	Pop.	±% p.a.
1968	321	—
1975	277	−2.08%
1982	306	+1.43%
1990	349	+1.66%
1999	331	−0.59%
2007	298	−1.30%
2012	330	+2.06%
2017	352	+1.30%
2023	353	+0.05%
Source: INSEE

== See also ==
- Communes of the Somme department
