= Étricourt-Manancourt =

- Commune
- Coat of arms
- Location of Étricourt-Manancourt
- Location within France Location within Hauts-de-France
- Coordinates: 50°02′06″N 2°59′10″E
- Country: France
- Region: Hauts-de-France
- Department: Somme
- Arrondissement: Péronne
- Canton: Péronne
- Intercommunality: Haute Somme

Government
  - Mayor (2020–2026): Jean-Pierre Coquette
- Area^{1}: 11.02 km^{2} (4.25 sq mi)
- Elevation: 97 m (318 ft)
- Highest elevation: 145 m (476 ft)
- Lowest elevation: 77 m (253 ft)
- Population (2023): 510
  - Density: 46/km^{2} (120/sq mi)
- Time zone: UTC+01:00 (CET)
  - Summer (DST): UTC+02:00 (CEST)
- INSEE/Postal code: 80298 /80360
- ^{1} French Land Register data, which excludes lakes, ponds, glaciers > 1 km^{2} (0.386 sq mi or 247 acres) and river estuaries.

Étricourt-Manancourt (French pronunciation: [etʁikuʁ manɑ̃kuʁ]; Picard: Étricourt-Monancourt) is a commune in the Somme department in Hauts-de-France in northern France.

== Geography ==
Étricourt-Manancourt is situated on the D43 road, some 59 km (37 mi) east-northeast of Amiens.

== Population ==
Historical population
Year	Pop.	±% p.a.
1968	612	—
1975	531	−2.01%
1982	502	−0.80%
1990	452	−1.30%
1999	400	−1.35%
2007	466	+1.93%
2012	529	+2.57%
2017	531	+0.08%
2023	510	−0.67%
Source: INSEE

== See also ==
- Communes of the Somme department
