= Heudicourt, Somme =

Heudicourt
- Commune
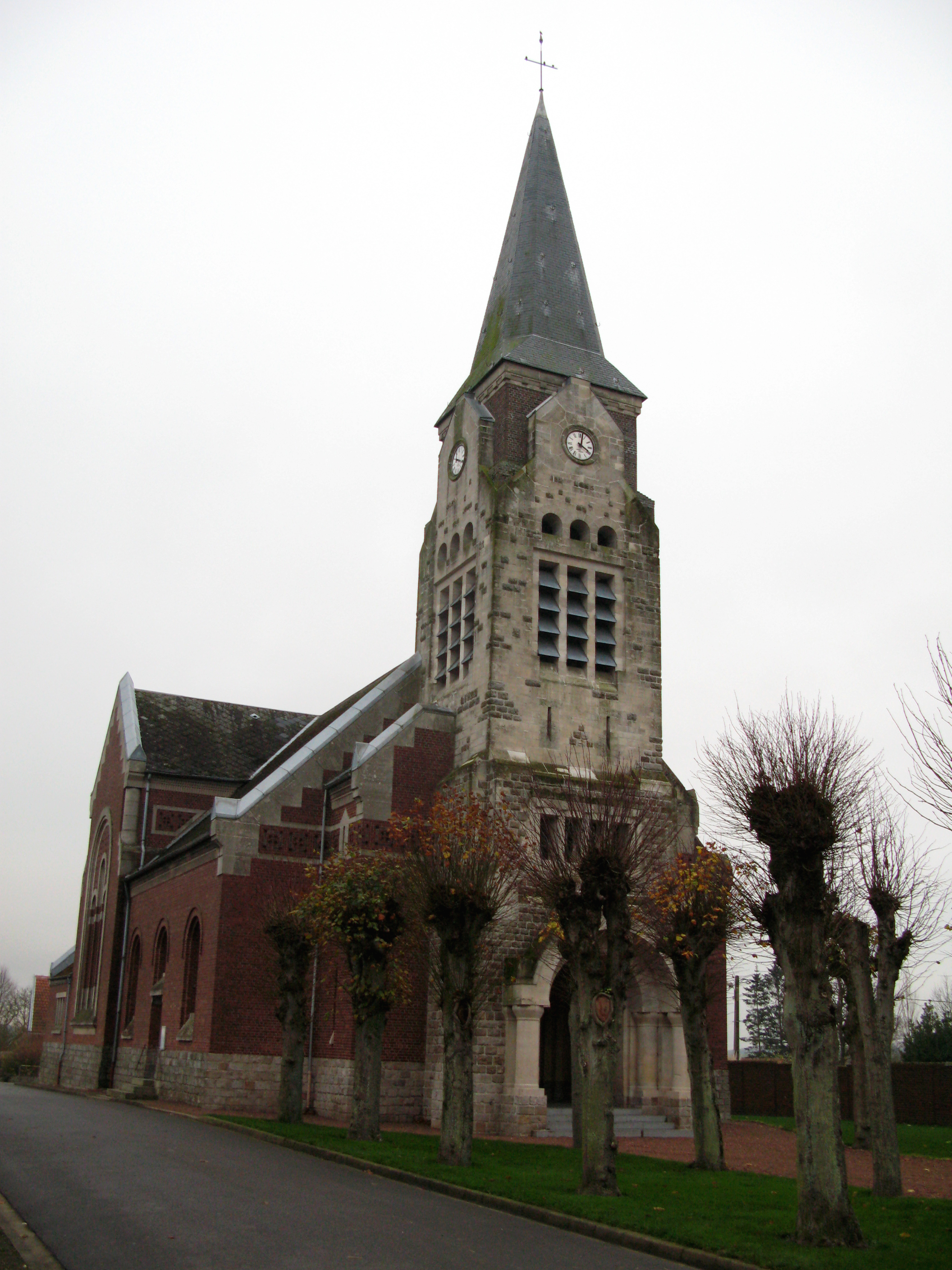
- The church in Heudicourt
- Location of Heudicourt
- Location within France Location within Hauts-de-France
- Coordinates: 50°01′26″N 3°04′47″E
- Country: France
- Region: Hauts-de-France
- Department: Somme
- Arrondissement: Péronne
- Canton: Péronne
- Intercommunality: Haute Somme

Government
  - Mayor (2020–2026): Michel Leplat
- Area^{1}: 12.71 km^{2} (4.91 sq mi)
- Elevation: 111 m (364 ft)
- Highest elevation: 144 m (472 ft)
- Lowest elevation: 107 m (351 ft)
- Population (2023): 527
  - Density: 41.5/km^{2} (107/sq mi)
- Time zone: UTC+01:00 (CET)
  - Summer (DST): UTC+02:00 (CEST)
- INSEE/Postal code: 80438 /80122
- ^{1} French Land Register data, which excludes lakes, ponds, glaciers > 1 km^{2} (0.386 sq mi or 247 acres) and river estuaries.

Heudicourt (French pronunciation: [ødikuʁ]) is a commune in the Somme department in Hauts-de-France in northern France.

== Geography ==
Heudicourt is situated on the D181 and D58 crossroads, some 15 miles (24 km) northeast of Saint-Quentin.

== Population ==
Historical population
Year	Pop.	±% p.a.
1968	686	—
1975	629	−1.23%
1982	548	−1.95%
1990	491	−1.36%
1999	502	+0.25%
2007	509	+0.17%
2012	537	+1.08%
2017	507	−1.14%
2023	527	+0.65%
Source: INSEE

== See also ==
- Communes of the Somme department
