= Mesnil-en-Arrouaise =

- Commune
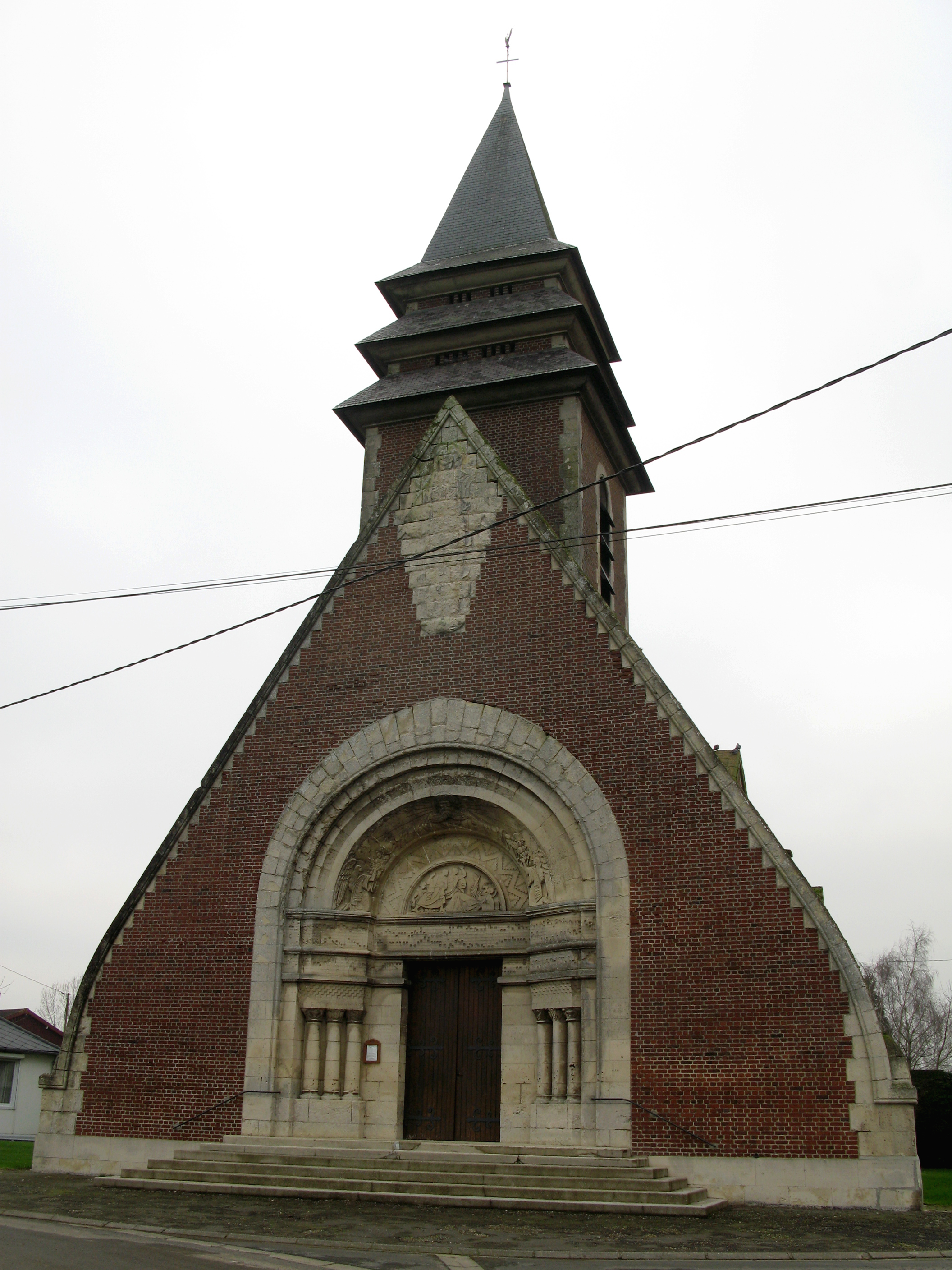
- The church in Mesnil-en-Arrouaise

- Coat of arms
- Location of Mesnil-en-Arrouaise
- Location within France Location within Hauts-de-France
- Coordinates: 50°02′42″N 2°56′44″E
- Country: France
- Region: Hauts-de-France
- Department: Somme
- Arrondissement: Péronne
- Canton: Péronne
- Intercommunality: Haute Somme

Government
  - Mayor (2020–2026): Alain Bellier
- Area^{1}: 6.5 km^{2} (2.5 sq mi)
- Elevation: 128 m (420 ft)
- Highest elevation: 152 m (499 ft)
- Lowest elevation: 99 m (325 ft)
- Population (2023): 105
  - Density: 16/km^{2} (42/sq mi)
- Time zone: UTC+01:00 (CET)
  - Summer (DST): UTC+02:00 (CEST)
- INSEE/Postal code: 80538 /80360
- ^{1} French Land Register data, which excludes lakes, ponds, glaciers > 1 km^{2} (0.386 sq mi or 247 acres) and river estuaries.

Mesnil-en-Arrouaise (French pronunciation: [mɛnil ɑ̃.n‿aʁwɛz]) is a commune in the Somme department in Hauts-de-France in northern France.

== Geography ==
The commune is situated on the D172 road, 31 kilometres (19 mi) southwest of Cambrai, in the ancient region of the Arrouaise, which, to the Romans, was a forest-frontier.

== Population ==
Historical population
Year	Pop.	±% p.a.
1968	172	—
1975	147	−2.22%
1982	127	−2.07%
1990	118	−0.91%
1999	124	+0.55%
2007	136	+1.16%
2012	146	+1.43%
2017	126	−2.90%
2023	105	−2.99%
Source: INSEE

== See also ==
- Communes of the Somme department
