= Pœuilly =

- Commune
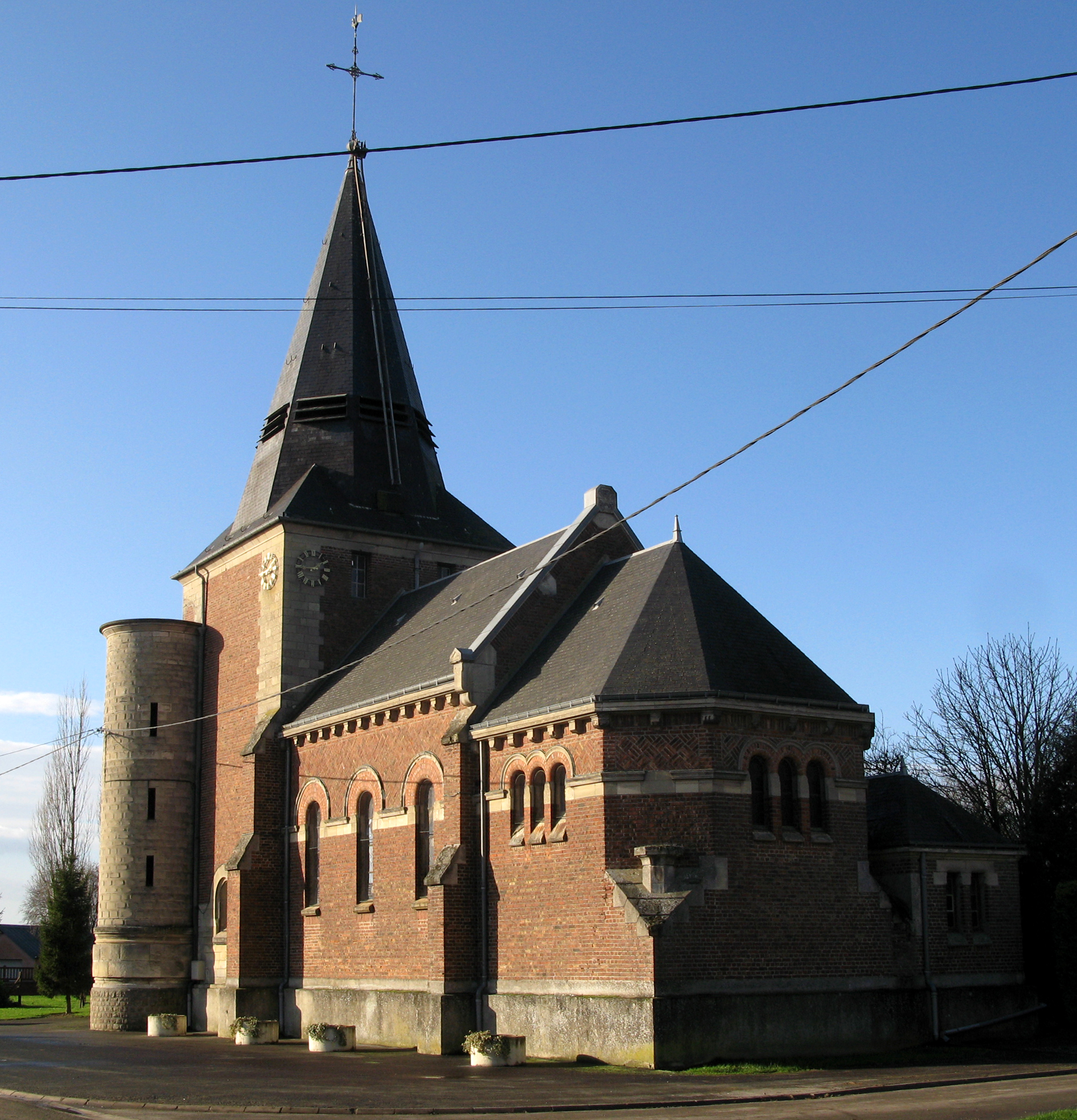
- The church in Poeuilly
- Location of Pœuilly
- Location within France Location within Hauts-de-France
- Coordinates: 49°52′56″N 3°06′23″E
- Country: France
- Region: Hauts-de-France
- Department: Somme
- Arrondissement: Péronne
- Canton: Péronne
- Intercommunality: Haute Somme

Government
  - Mayor (2020–2026): Arnaud Voiret
- Area^{1}: 6.22 km^{2} (2.40 sq mi)
- Elevation: 100 m (330 ft)
- Highest elevation: 104 m (341 ft)
- Lowest elevation: 62 m (203 ft)
- Population (2023): 107
  - Density: 17.2/km^{2} (44.6/sq mi)
- Time zone: UTC+01:00 (CET)
  - Summer (DST): UTC+02:00 (CEST)
- INSEE/Postal code: 80629 /80240
- ^{1} French Land Register data, which excludes lakes, ponds, glaciers > 1 km^{2} (0.386 sq mi or 247 acres) and river estuaries.

Pœuilly (French pronunciation: [pœji]) is a commune in the Somme department and Hauts-de-France region of northern France.

== Geography ==
Pœuilly is situated on the D1029 road, some 14 km west-north-west of Saint-Quentin.

== Population ==
Historical population
Year	Pop.	±% p.a.
1968	88	—
1975	86	−0.33%
1982	75	−1.94%
1990	107	+4.54%
1999	105	−0.21%
2007	103	−0.24%
2012	106	+0.58%
2017	121	+2.68%
2023	107	−2.03%
Source: INSEE

== See also ==
- Communes of the Somme department
