= Vraignes-en-Vermandois =

- Commune
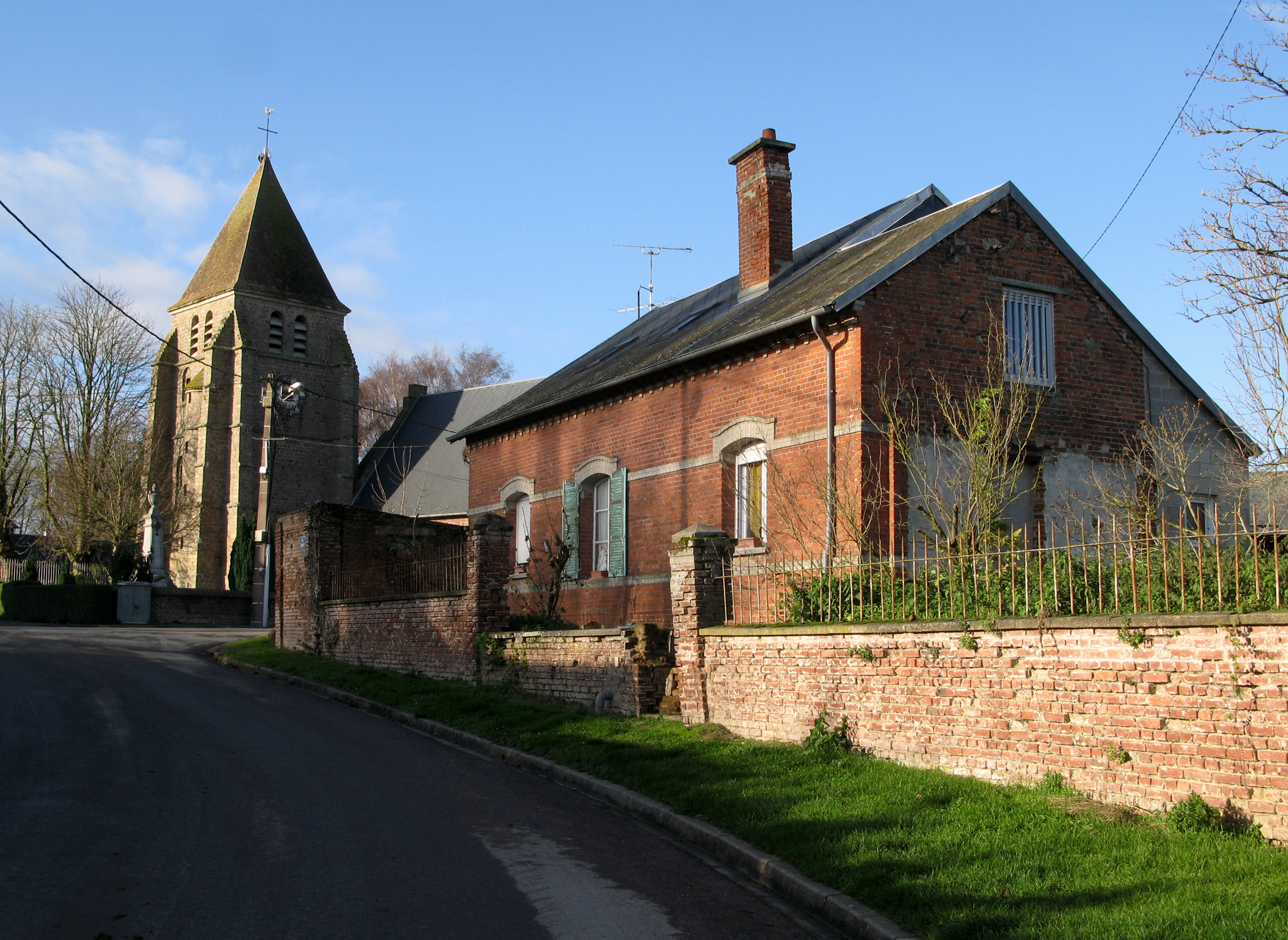
- The church in Vraignes-en-Vermandois
- Location of Vraignes-en-Vermandois
- Location within France Location within Hauts-de-France
- Coordinates: 49°53′16″N 3°03′58″E
- Country: France
- Region: Hauts-de-France
- Department: Somme
- Arrondissement: Péronne
- Canton: Péronne
- Intercommunality: Haute Somme

Government
  - Mayor (2020–2026): Maryse Fagot
- Area^{1}: 4.22 km^{2} (1.63 sq mi)
- Elevation: 93 m (305 ft)
- Highest elevation: 103 m (338 ft)
- Lowest elevation: 67 m (220 ft)
- Population (2023): 130
  - Density: 31/km^{2} (80/sq mi)
- Time zone: UTC+01:00 (CET)
  - Summer (DST): UTC+02:00 (CEST)
- INSEE/Postal code: 80812 /80240
- ^{1} French Land Register data, which excludes lakes, ponds, glaciers > 1 km^{2} (0.386 sq mi or 247 acres) and river estuaries.

Vraignes-en-Vermandois is a commune in the Somme department in Hauts-de-France in northern France.

== Geography ==
The commune is situated 12 miles (19 km) northwest of Saint-Quentin, on the D15 road and on the border with the department of Aisne.

== Population ==
Historical population
Year	Pop.	±% p.a.
1968	154	—
1975	146	−0.76%
1982	150	+0.39%
1990	145	−0.42%
1999	148	+0.23%
2007	165	+1.37%
2012	157	−0.99%
2017	142	−1.99%
2023	130	−1.46%
Source: INSEE

== See also ==
- Communes of the Somme department
