= Combles =

- Commune
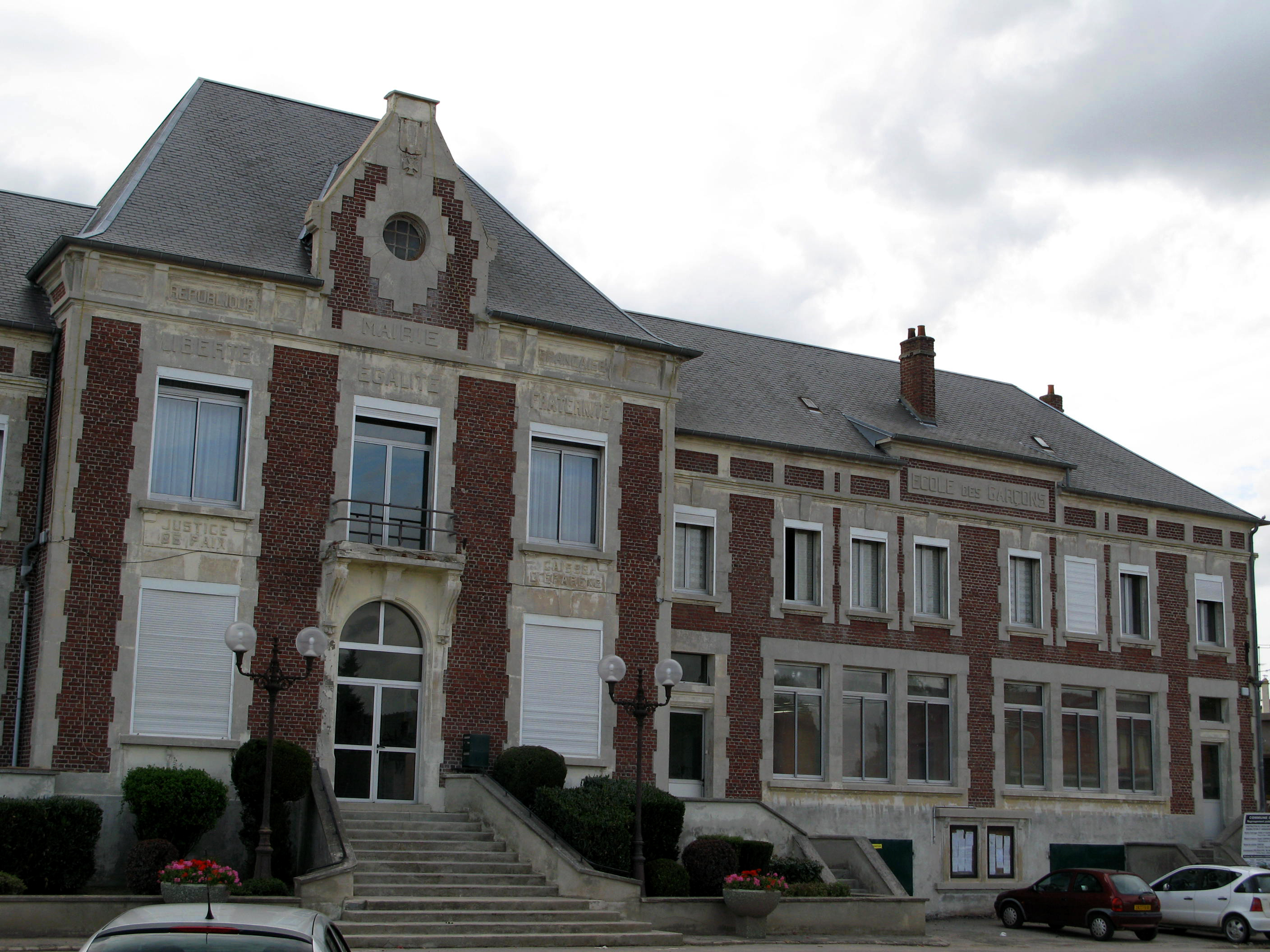
- The town hall in Combles

- Coat of arms
- Location of Combles
- Location within France Location within Hauts-de-France
- Coordinates: 50°00′36″N 2°51′58″E
- Country: France
- Region: Hauts-de-France
- Department: Somme
- Arrondissement: Péronne
- Canton: Péronne
- Intercommunality: Haute Somme

Government
  - Mayor (2020–2026): Betty Sorel
- Area^{1}: 9.87 km^{2} (3.81 sq mi)
- Elevation: 30 m (98 ft)
- Highest elevation: 153 m (502 ft)
- Lowest elevation: 83 m (272 ft)
- Population (2023): 757
  - Density: 76.7/km^{2} (199/sq mi)
- Time zone: UTC+01:00 (CET)
  - Summer (DST): UTC+02:00 (CEST)
- INSEE/Postal code: 80204 /80360
- ^{1} French Land Register data, which excludes lakes, ponds, glaciers > 1 km^{2} (0.386 sq mi or 247 acres) and river estuaries.

Combles (French pronunciation: [kɔ̃bl]; Picard: Conme) is a commune in the Somme department in Hauts-de-France in northern France. The city is part of the First World War remembrance circuit.

== Geography ==
Combles is situated on the D20 road, some 50 km (31 mi) north-east of Amiens.

== History ==
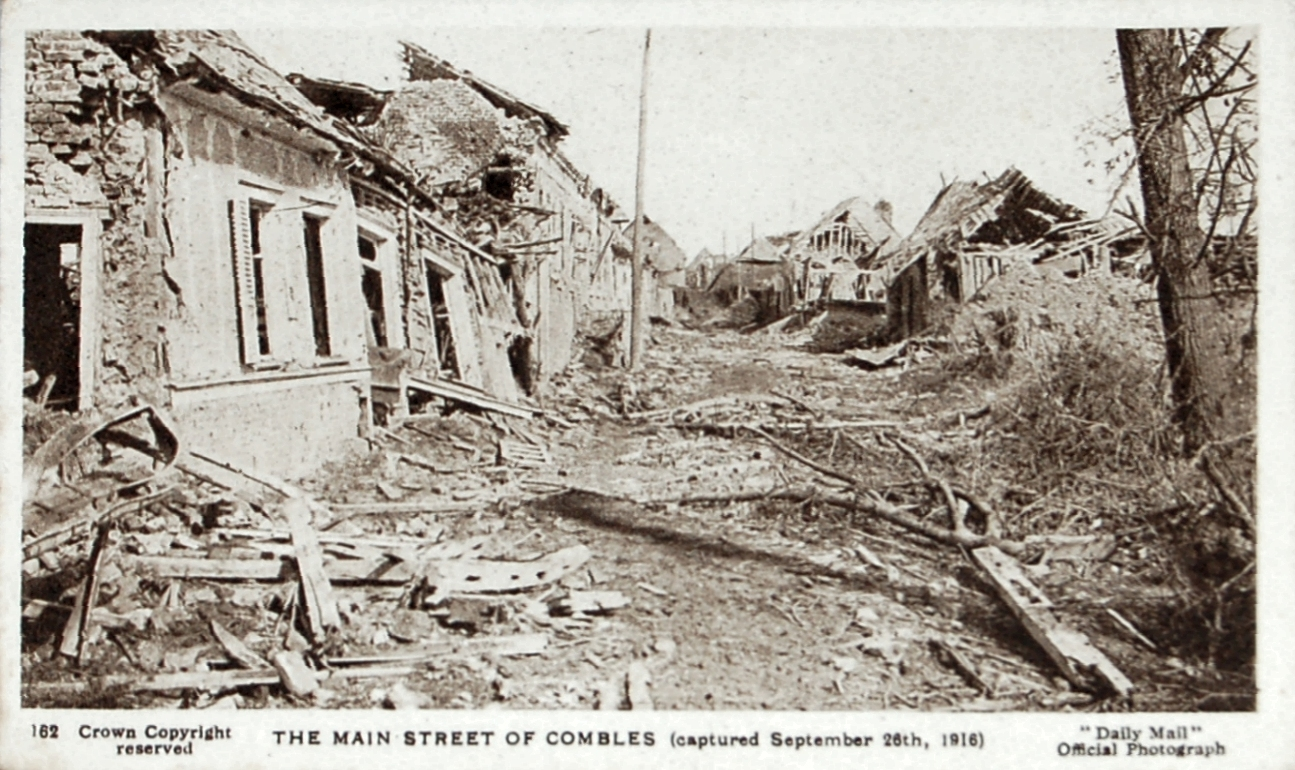
Combles after its capture in 1916 by British and French troops

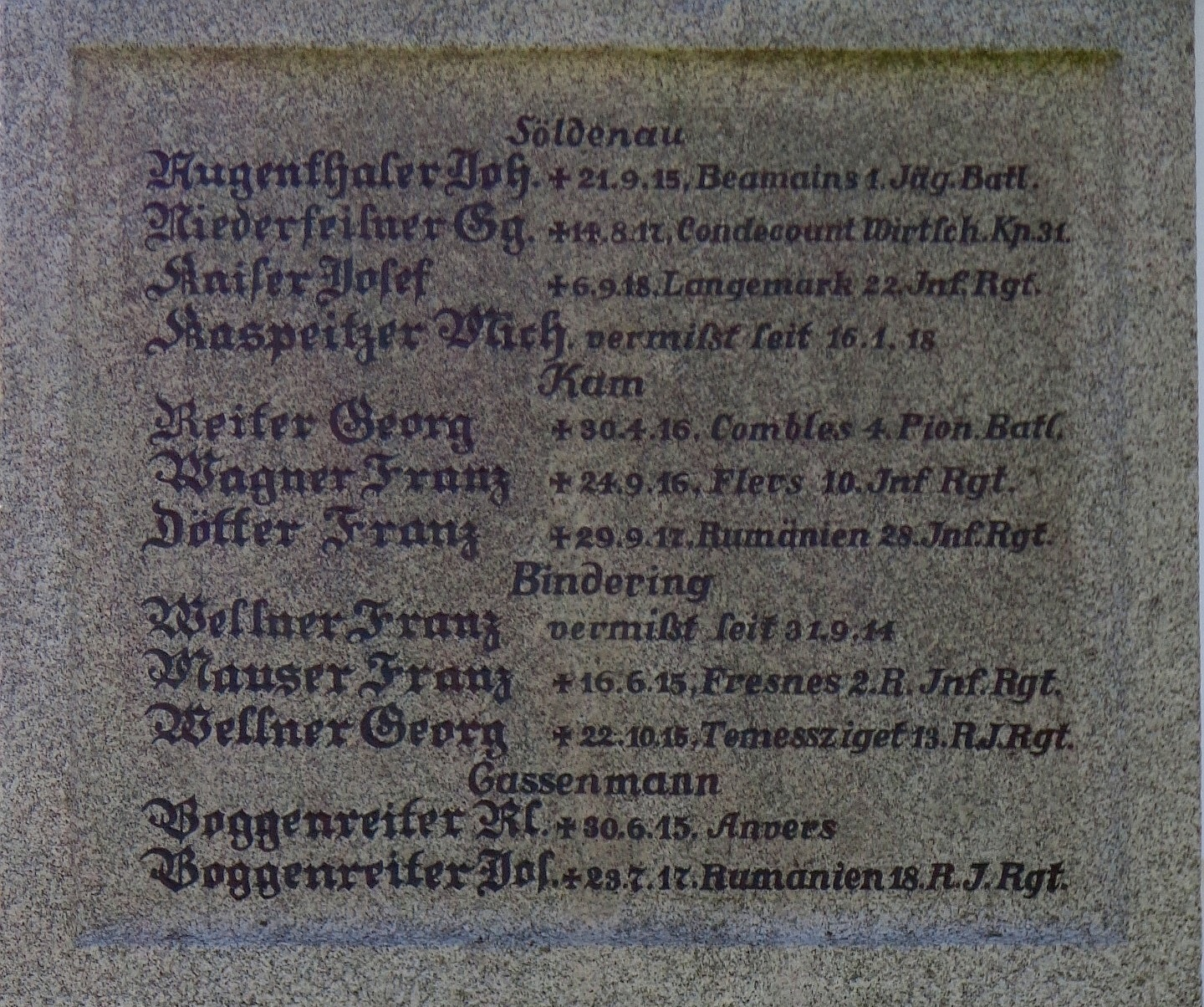
Söldenau war memorial (Ortenburg, Germany); among the dead is Georg Reiter, killed at Combles on 30 April 1916

Combles was the operations centre for the battle of Bapaume during the Franco-Prussian War of 1870–71.

Combles was again at the centre of much fighting during World War I (1914–1918), with many of its buildings damaged and many of its residents injured or killed, not to mention the numerous casualties among the forces in combat there. Many British soldiers who fell in the war are buried in the local cemetery, and there are numerous war cemeteries in the immediate surrounding area.

It has, however, been substantially developed since the war's end.

== Population ==
Historical population
Year	Pop.	±% p.a.
1968	691	—
1975	661	−0.63%
1982	648	−0.28%
1990	617	−0.61%
1999	676	+1.02%
2007	707	+0.56%
2012	795	+2.37%
2017	765	−0.77%
2023	757	−0.18%
Source: INSEE

== See also ==
- Communes of the Somme department
