= Tincourt-Boucly =

- Commune
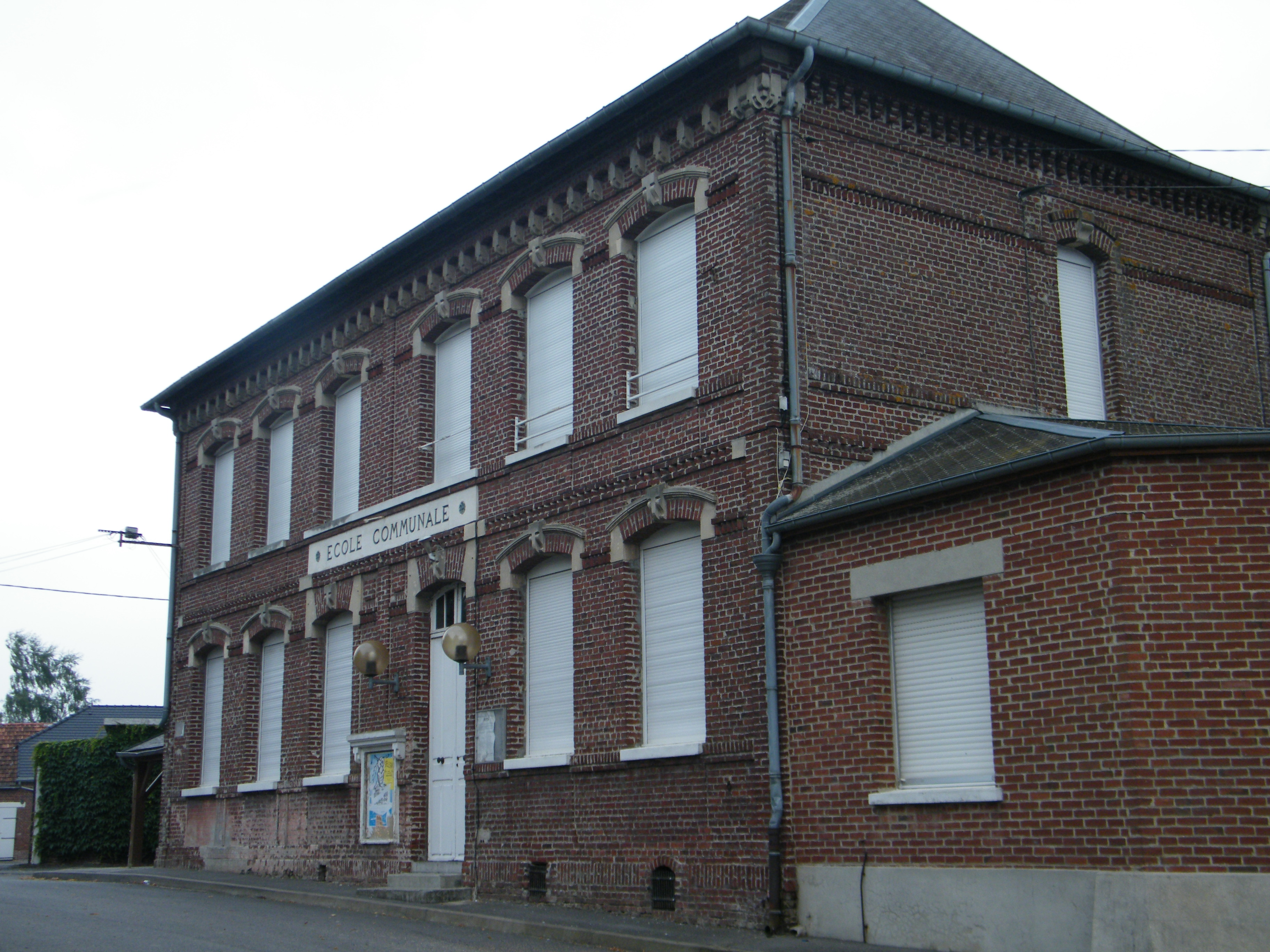
- The school in Tincourt-Boucly
- Location of Tincourt-Boucly
- Location within France Location within Hauts-de-France
- Coordinates: 49°56′25″N 3°02′36″E
- Country: France
- Region: Hauts-de-France
- Department: Somme
- Arrondissement: Péronne
- Canton: Péronne
- Intercommunality: Haute Somme

Government
  - Mayor (2020–2026): Vincent Morgant
- Area^{1}: 12.8 km^{2} (4.9 sq mi)
- Elevation: 63 m (207 ft)
- Highest elevation: 133 m (436 ft)
- Lowest elevation: 59 m (194 ft)
- Population (2023): 334
  - Density: 26.1/km^{2} (67.6/sq mi)
- Time zone: UTC+01:00 (CET)
  - Summer (DST): UTC+02:00 (CEST)
- INSEE/Postal code: 80762 /80240
- ^{1} French Land Register data, which excludes lakes, ponds, glaciers > 1 km^{2} (0.386 sq mi or 247 acres) and river estuaries.

Tincourt-Boucly (French pronunciation: [tɛ̃kuʁ bukli]) is a commune in the Somme department in Hauts-de-France in northern France.

== Geography ==
The commune is situated 33 miles (53 km) east of Amiens, on the D88 and D199 roads.

== Population ==
Historical population
Year	Pop.	±% p.a.
1968	429	—
1975	385	−1.53%
1982	384	−0.04%
1990	383	−0.03%
1999	389	+0.17%
2007	400	+0.35%
2012	377	−1.18%
2017	356	−1.14%
2023	334	−1.06%
Source: INSEE

== See also ==
- Communes of the Somme department
