= Longavesnes =

- Commune
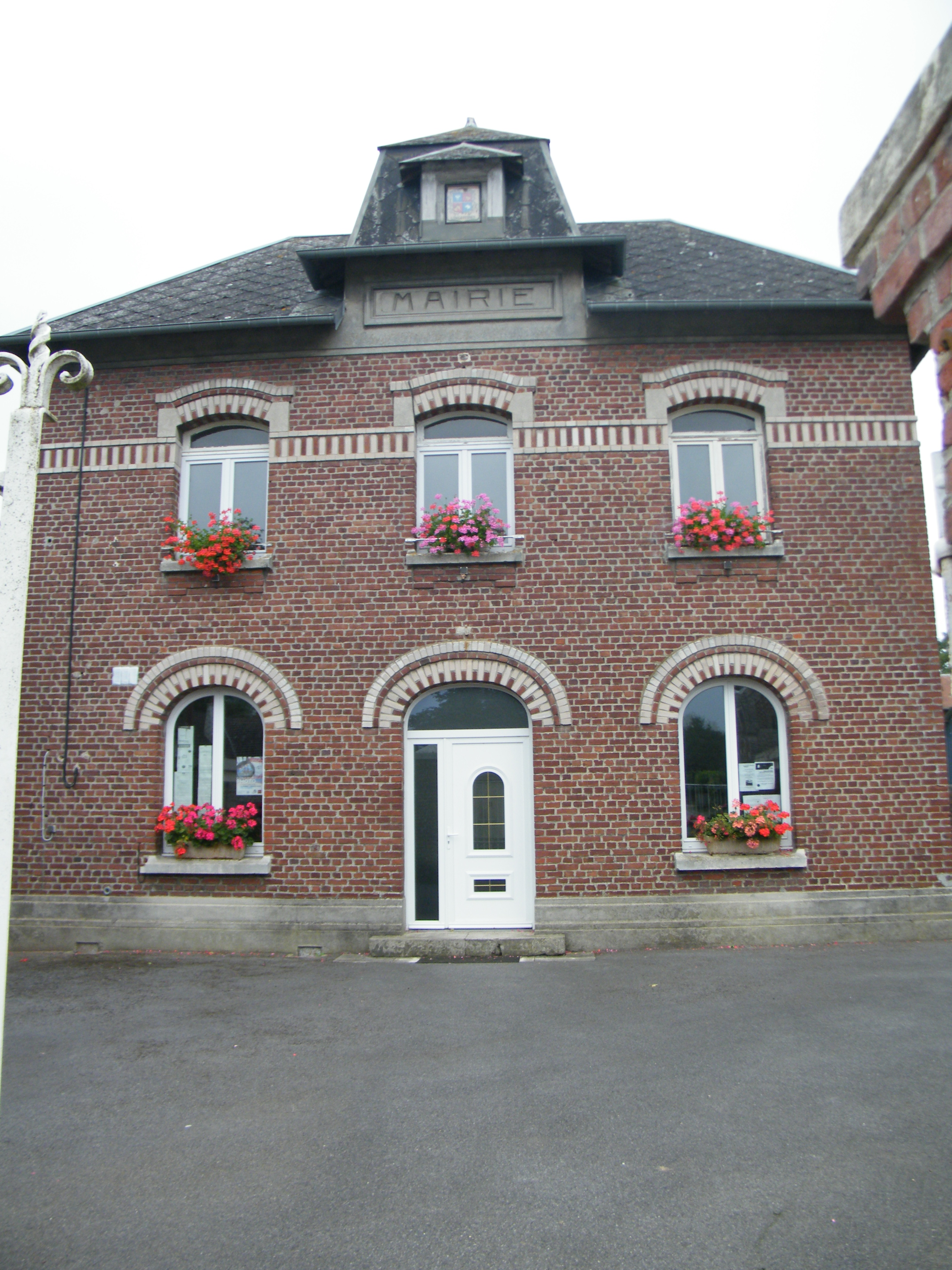
- The town hall in Longavesnes

- Coat of arms
- Location of Longavesnes
- Location within France Location within Hauts-de-France
- Coordinates: 49°58′18″N 3°03′37″E
- Country: France
- Region: Hauts-de-France
- Department: Somme
- Arrondissement: Péronne
- Canton: Péronne
- Intercommunality: Haute Somme

Government
  - Mayor (2020–2026): Xavier Wauters
- Area^{1}: 4.09 km^{2} (1.58 sq mi)
- Elevation: 100 m (330 ft)
- Highest elevation: 144 m (472 ft)
- Lowest elevation: 94 m (308 ft)
- Population (2023): 77
  - Density: 19/km^{2} (49/sq mi)
- Time zone: UTC+01:00 (CET)
  - Summer (DST): UTC+02:00 (CEST)
- INSEE/Postal code: 80487 /80240
- ^{1} French Land Register data, which excludes lakes, ponds, glaciers > 1 km^{2} (0.386 sq mi or 247 acres) and river estuaries.

Longavesnes (French pronunciation: [lɔ̃ɡavɛn]) is a commune in the Somme department in Hauts-de-France in northern France.

== Geography ==
Longavesnes is situated 13 miles (21 km) northwest of Saint-Quentin, in the northeast corner of the department, on the D101 road.

== Population ==
Historical population
Year	Pop.	±% p.a.
1968	138	—
1975	136	−0.21%
1982	108	−3.24%
1990	110	+0.23%
1999	104	−0.62%
2007	100	−0.49%
2012	84	−3.43%
2017	86	+0.47%
2023	77	−1.83%
Source: INSEE

== See also ==
- Communes of the Somme department
