= Marquaix =

- Commune
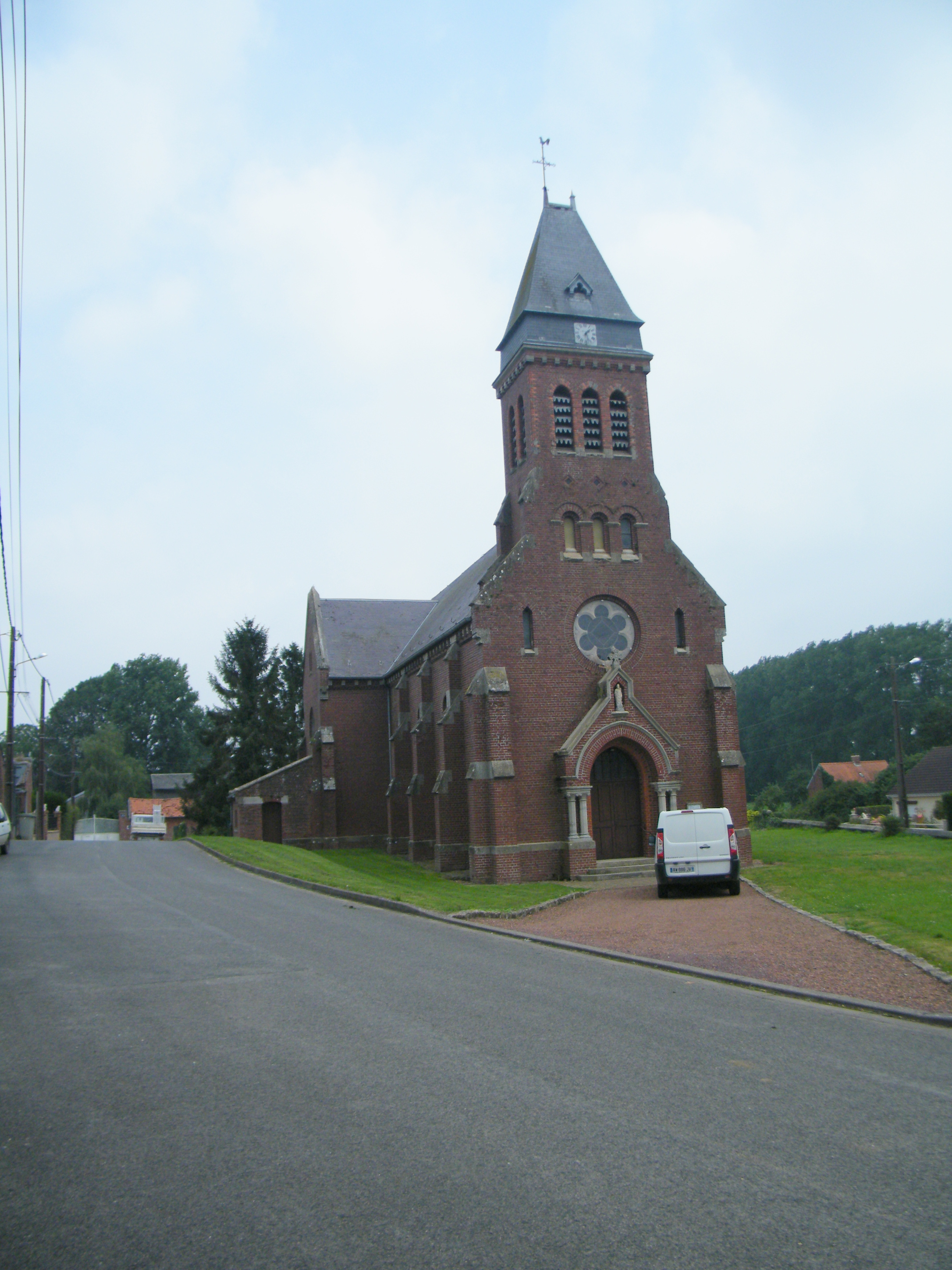
- The church in Marquaix
- Location of Marquaix
- Location within France Location within Hauts-de-France
- Coordinates: 49°56′45″N 3°04′33″E
- Country: France
- Region: Hauts-de-France
- Department: Somme
- Arrondissement: Péronne
- Canton: Péronne
- Intercommunality: Haute Somme

Government
  - Mayor (2020–2026): Claude Celma
- Area^{1}: 5.29 km^{2} (2.04 sq mi)
- Elevation: 68 m (223 ft)
- Highest elevation: 142 m (466 ft)
- Lowest elevation: 65 m (213 ft)
- Population (2023): 190
  - Density: 36/km^{2} (93/sq mi)
- Time zone: UTC+01:00 (CET)
  - Summer (DST): UTC+02:00 (CEST)
- INSEE/Postal code: 80516 /80240
- ^{1} French Land Register data, which excludes lakes, ponds, glaciers > 1 km^{2} (0.386 sq mi or 247 acres) and river estuaries.

Marquaix (French pronunciation: [maʁkɛ]) is a commune in the Somme department in Hauts-de-France in northern France.

== Geography ==
Marquaix is situated on the D6 road, some 15 miles (24 km) northwest of Saint-Quentin.

== Population ==
Historical population
Year	Pop.	±% p.a.
1968	200	—
1975	213	+0.90%
1982	198	−1.04%
1990	216	+1.09%
1999	210	−0.31%
2007	222	+0.70%
2012	220	−0.18%
2017	200	−1.89%
2023	190	−0.85%
Source: INSEE

== See also ==
- Communes of the Somme department
