= Aizecourt-le-Bas =

Commune in Hauts-de-France, France

- Commune
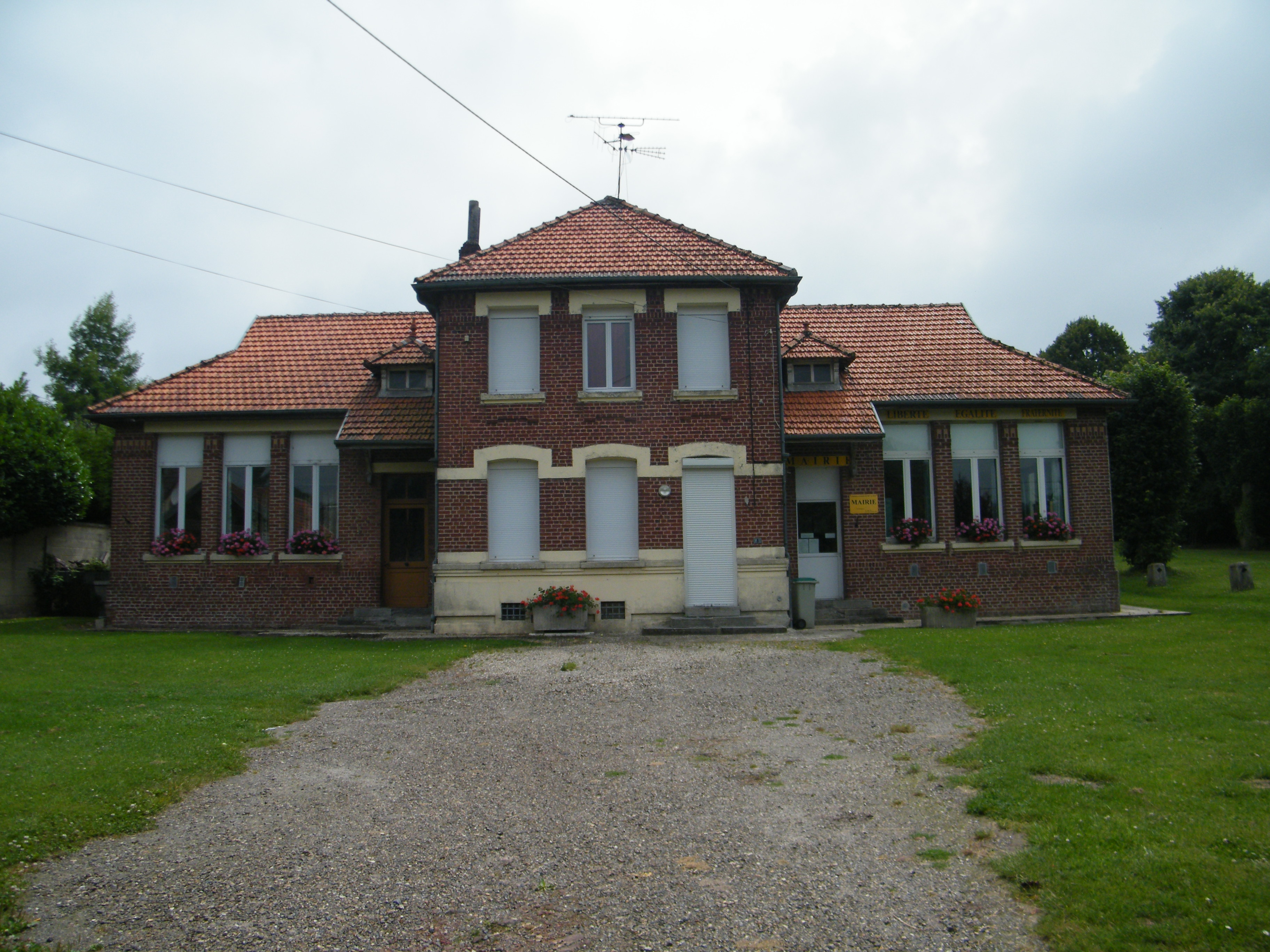
- The town hall of Aizecourt-le-Bas
- Location of Aizecourt-le-Bas
- Location within France Location within Hauts-de-France
- Coordinates: 49°58′55″N 3°02′04″E
- Country: France
- Region: Hauts-de-France
- Department: Somme
- Arrondissement: Péronne
- Canton: Péronne
- Intercommunality: Haute-Somme

Government
  - Mayor (2020–2026): Florence Choquet
- Area^{1}: 3.57 km^{2} (1.38 sq mi)
- Elevation: 120 m (390 ft)
- Highest elevation: 149 m (489 ft)
- Lowest elevation: 93 m (305 ft)
- Population (2023): 69
  - Density: 19/km^{2} (50/sq mi)
- Time zone: UTC+01:00 (CET)
  - Summer (DST): UTC+02:00 (CEST)
- INSEE/Postal code: 80014 /80240
- ^{1} French Land Register data, which excludes lakes, ponds, glaciers > 1 km^{2} (0.386 sq mi or 247 acres) and river estuaries.

Aizecourt-le-Bas (French pronunciation: [ɛzkuʁ lə ba]) is a commune in the Somme department in Hauts-de-France in northern France.

== Geography ==
The commune is situated 35 km (22 mi) northwest of Saint-Quentin, on the D 72.

== Population ==
Historical population
Year	Pop.	±% p.a.
1968	67	—
1975	52	−3.56%
1982	54	+0.54%
1990	56	+0.46%
1999	60	+0.77%
2007	57	−0.64%
2012	60	+1.03%
2017	54	−2.09%
2023	69	+4.17%
Source: INSEE

== See also ==
- Communes of the Somme department
