= Hardecourt-aux-Bois =

- Commune
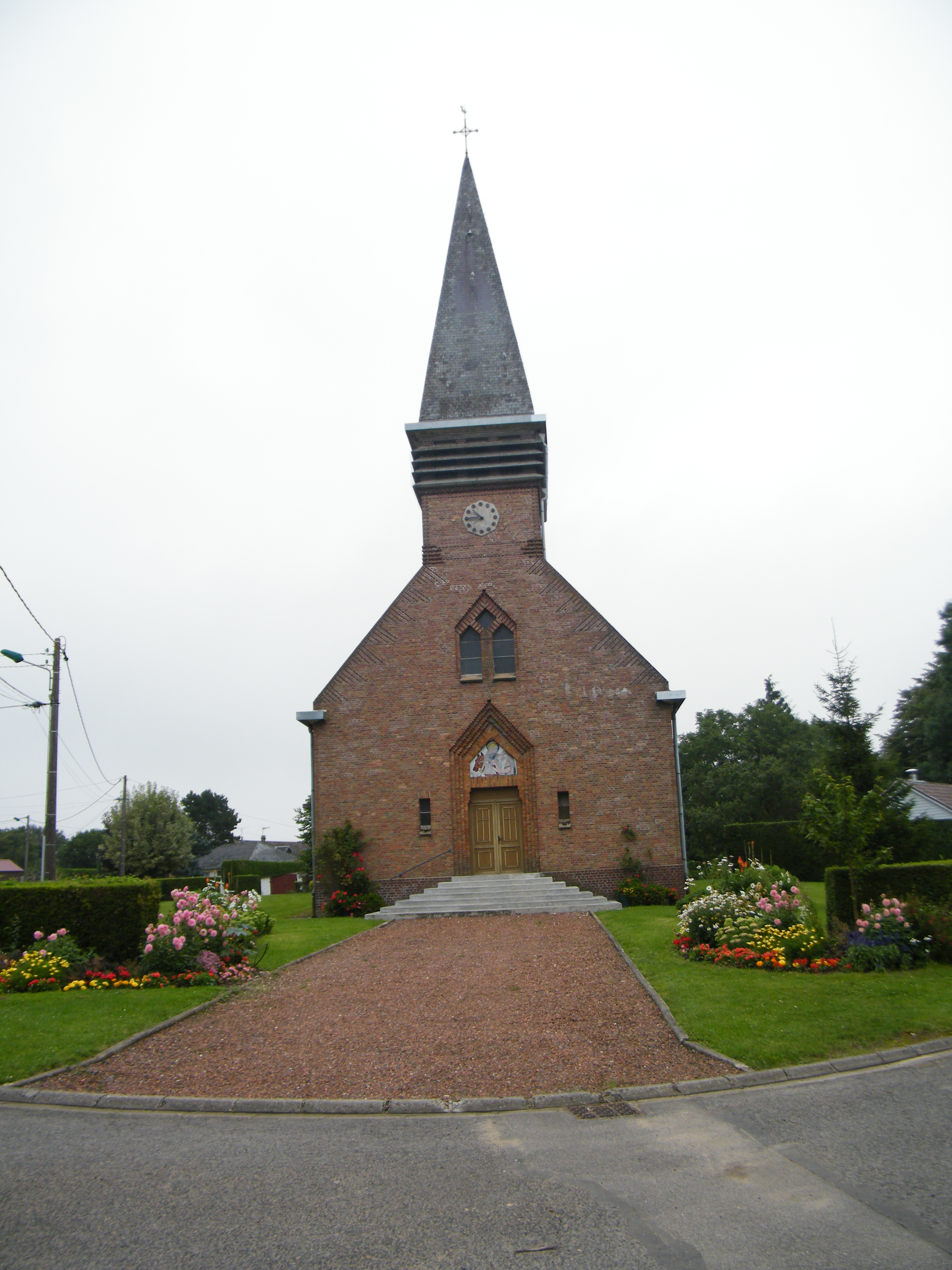
- The church in Hardecourt-aux-Bois
- Location of Hardecourt-aux-Bois
- Location within France Location within Hauts-de-France
- Coordinates: 49°59′26″N 2°49′07″E
- Country: France
- Region: Hauts-de-France
- Department: Somme
- Arrondissement: Péronne
- Canton: Péronne
- Intercommunality: Haute Somme

Government
  - Mayor (2020–2026): Bernard Francois
- Area^{1}: 5.23 km^{2} (2.02 sq mi)
- Elevation: 122 m (400 ft)
- Highest elevation: 146 m (479 ft)
- Lowest elevation: 75 m (246 ft)
- Population (2023): 84
  - Density: 16/km^{2} (42/sq mi)
- Time zone: UTC+01:00 (CET)
  - Summer (DST): UTC+02:00 (CEST)
- INSEE/Postal code: 80418 /80360
- ^{1} French Land Register data, which excludes lakes, ponds, glaciers > 1 km^{2} (0.386 sq mi or 247 acres) and river estuaries.

Hardecourt-aux-Bois is a commune in the Somme department in Hauts-de-France in northern France.

== Geography ==
The commune is situated on the D146b road, 50 km (31 mi) northeast of Amiens.

== Population ==
Historical population
Year	Pop.	±% p.a.
1968	99	—
1975	72	−4.45%
1982	73	+0.20%
1990	73	+0.00%
1999	84	+1.57%
2007	81	−0.45%
2012	73	−2.06%
2017	84	+2.85%
2023	84	+0.00%
Source: INSEE

== See also ==
- Communes of the Somme department
