= Ronssoy =

- Commune
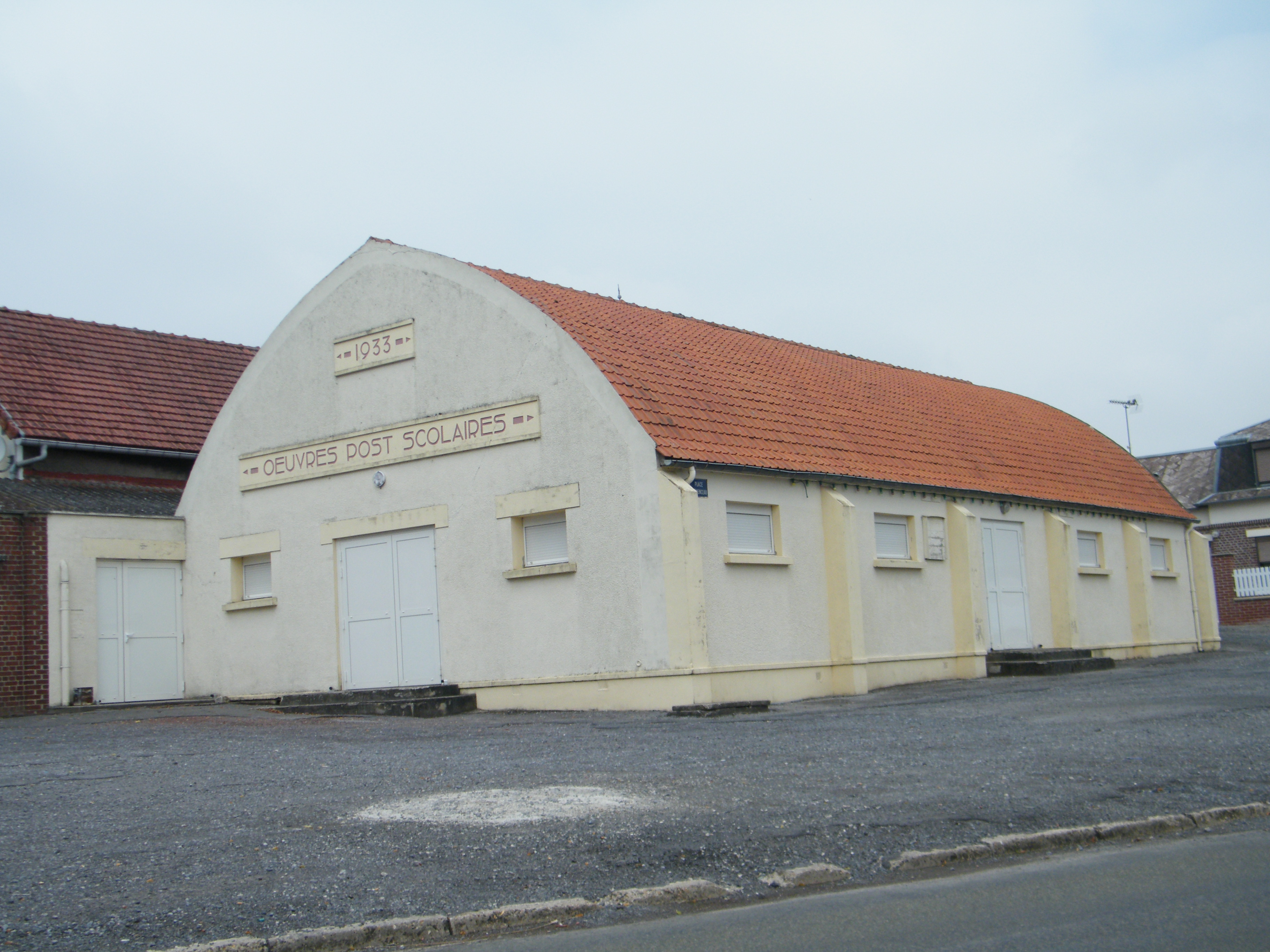
- The town hall in Ronssoy
- Location of Ronssoy
- Location within France Location within Hauts-de-France
- Coordinates: 49°58′58″N 3°09′38″E
- Country: France
- Region: Hauts-de-France
- Department: Somme
- Arrondissement: Péronne
- Canton: Péronne
- Intercommunality: Haute Somme

Government
  - Mayor (2020–2026): Michel Bray
- Area^{1}: 7.53 km^{2} (2.91 sq mi)
- Elevation: 149 m (489 ft)
- Highest elevation: 147 m (482 ft)
- Lowest elevation: 100 m (330 ft)
- Population (2023): 577
  - Density: 76.6/km^{2} (198/sq mi)
- Time zone: UTC+01:00 (CET)
  - Summer (DST): UTC+02:00 (CEST)
- INSEE/Postal code: 80679 /80740
- ^{1} French Land Register data, which excludes lakes, ponds, glaciers > 1 km^{2} (0.386 sq mi or 247 acres) and river estuaries.

Ronssoy (French pronunciation: [ʁɔ̃swa]) is a commune in the Somme department in Hauts-de-France in northern France.

== Geography ==
Ronssoy is situated 11 miles (18 km) north of Saint-Quentin, on the D6 road.

== Population ==
Historical population
Year	Pop.	±% p.a.
1968	696	—
1975	636	−1.28%
1982	654	+0.40%
1990	624	−0.59%
1999	612	−0.22%
2007	537	−1.62%
2012	579	+1.52%
2017	587	+0.27%
2023	577	−0.29%
Source: INSEE

== See also ==
- Communes of the Somme department
