= Flers, Somme =

Flers
- Commune
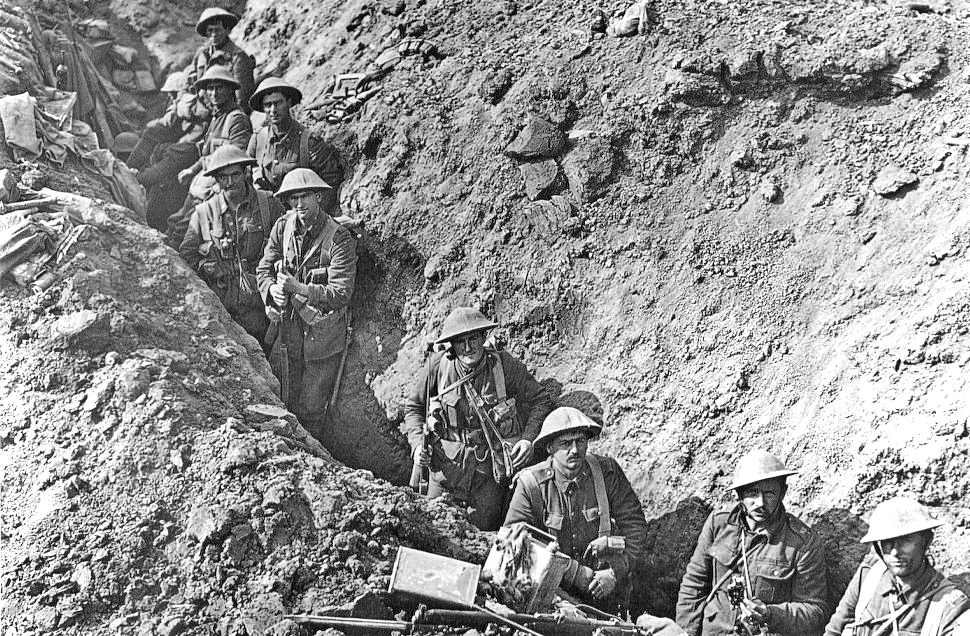
- Trenches near Flers, in September 1916
- Location of Flers
- Location within France Location within Hauts-de-France
- Coordinates: 50°02′57″N 2°49′20″E
- Country: France
- Region: Hauts-de-France
- Department: Somme
- Arrondissement: Péronne
- Canton: Péronne
- Intercommunality: Haute Somme

Government
  - Mayor (2020–2026): Pierrick Capelle
- Area^{1}: 6.27 km^{2} (2.42 sq mi)
- Elevation: 127 m (417 ft)
- Highest elevation: 151 m (495 ft)
- Lowest elevation: 108 m (354 ft)
- Population (2023): 190
  - Density: 30/km^{2} (78/sq mi)
- Time zone: UTC+01:00 (CET)
  - Summer (DST): UTC+02:00 (CEST)
- INSEE/Postal code: 80314 /80360
- ^{1} French Land Register data, which excludes lakes, ponds, glaciers > 1 km^{2} (0.386 sq mi or 247 acres) and river estuaries.

Flers is a commune near the northern edge of the Somme department in Hauts-de-France in northern France.

It lies to the south of the D929 road, between Albert and Bapaume.

== History ==
In 1916, the Battle of Flers–Courcelette saw the first use of the tank (the Mark I) in the field of battle.

== Demography ==
Historical population
Year	Pop.	±% p.a.
1968	220	—
1975	212	−0.53%
1982	184	−2.00%
1990	182	−0.14%
1999	138	−3.03%
2007	159	+1.79%
2012	178	+2.28%
2017	195	+1.84%
2023	190	−0.43%
Source: INSEE

== See also ==
- Communes of the Somme department
