= Lesbœufs =

- Commune
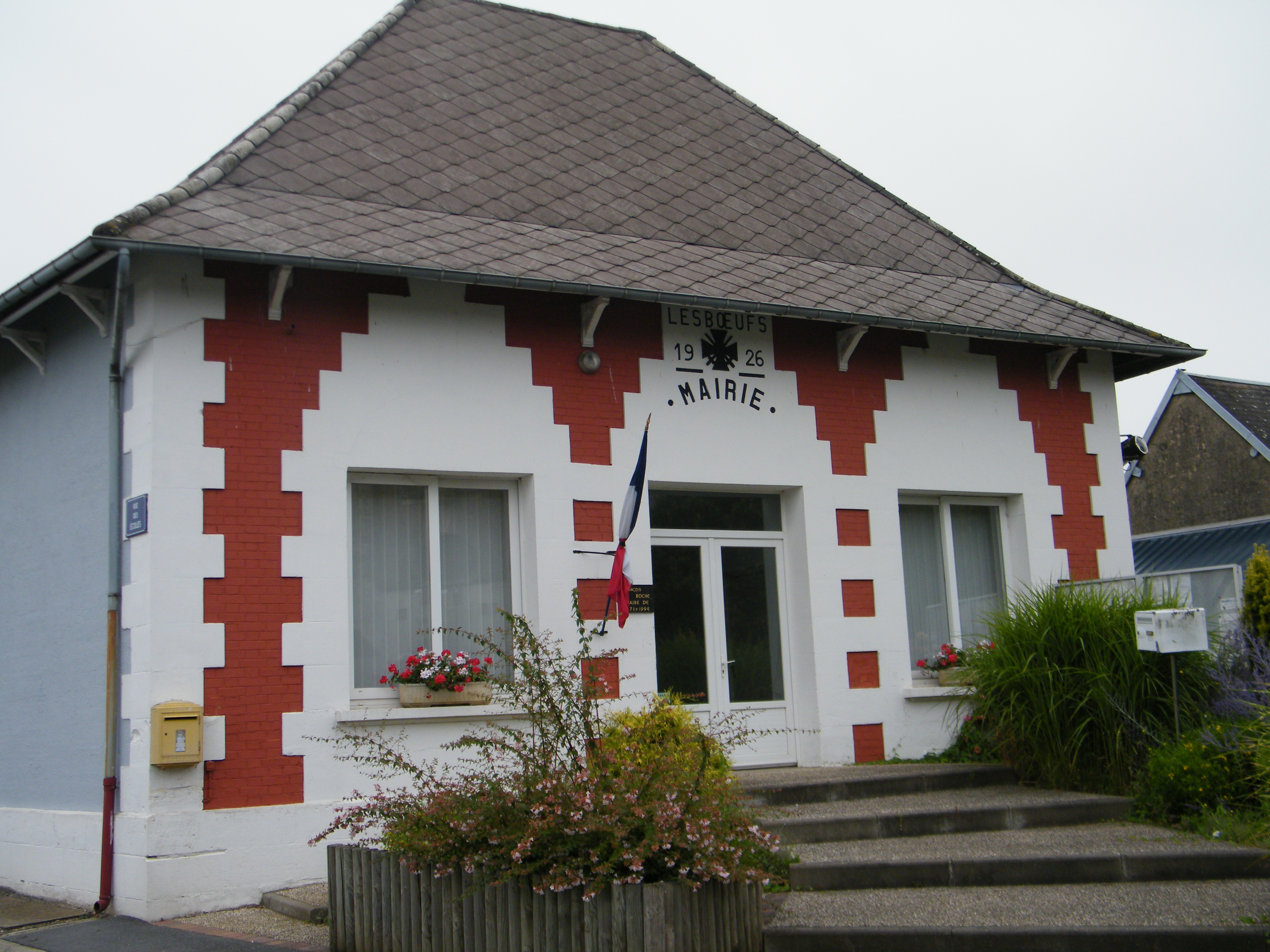
- Lesbœufs town hall
- Location of Lesbœufs
- Location within France Location within Hauts-de-France
- Coordinates: 50°02′34″N 2°51′48″E
- Country: France
- Region: Hauts-de-France
- Department: Somme
- Arrondissement: Péronne
- Canton: Péronne
- Intercommunality: Haute Somme

Government
  - Mayor (2020–2026): Etienne Dubruque
- Area^{1}: 5.97 km^{2} (2.31 sq mi)
- Elevation: 31 m (102 ft)
- Highest elevation: 154 m (505 ft)
- Lowest elevation: 112 m (367 ft)
- Population (2023): 166
  - Density: 27.8/km^{2} (72.0/sq mi)
- Time zone: UTC+01:00 (CET)
  - Summer (DST): UTC+02:00 (CEST)
- INSEE/Postal code: 80472 /80360
- ^{1} French Land Register data, which excludes lakes, ponds, glaciers > 1 km^{2} (0.386 sq mi or 247 acres) and river estuaries.

Lesbœufs (French pronunciation: [lebø]) is a commune in the Somme department in Hauts-de-France in northern France.

== Geography ==
Lesbœufs is situated on the D74 road, about 0.8 km (0.50 mi) from the A1 autoroute, some 48 km (30 mi) northeast of Amiens and 15 km (9 mi) north-east of Albert.

== History ==
The village was named from a legend about the Scottish monk, Saint Furcy who came as an evangelist to Picardy. He died during a journey to Péronne, where he had wanted to visit a church that he'd ordered to be built. Several communes claimed his body for burial. After negotiations, it was decided that he would be buried at the place where the oxen (the beef), pulling his funeral cart, decided to stop. They pulled up at Péronne, where St Furcy became patron Saint. The village where these negotiations took place was first called "Les Boeufs" then "Lesboeufs".

The little village has one feature of interest to outsiders, the Guards Cemetery. There are now 3,136 casualties of the First World War buried or commemorated in this cemetery which was designed by Sir Herbert Baker. Occupied by the Germans, Lesboeufs was attacked by the Guards Division on 15 September 1916 and captured eight days later. It was lost on 24 March 1918 during the German spring offensive and recaptured on 29 August by the 10th Bn, South Wales Borderers.

== Population ==
Historical population
Year	Pop.	±% p.a.
1968	213	—
1975	150	−4.89%
1982	138	−1.18%
1990	159	+1.79%
1999	151	−0.57%
2007	164	+1.04%
2012	151	−1.64%
2017	182	+3.81%
2023	166	−1.52%
Source: INSEE

== Places of interest ==
- The church
- The Military cemetery - the "Guards' cemetery"

== Personalities ==
- Saint Furcy - Patron saint of the neighbouring town of Péronne

== See also ==
- Communes of the Somme department
