= Hancourt =

- Commune
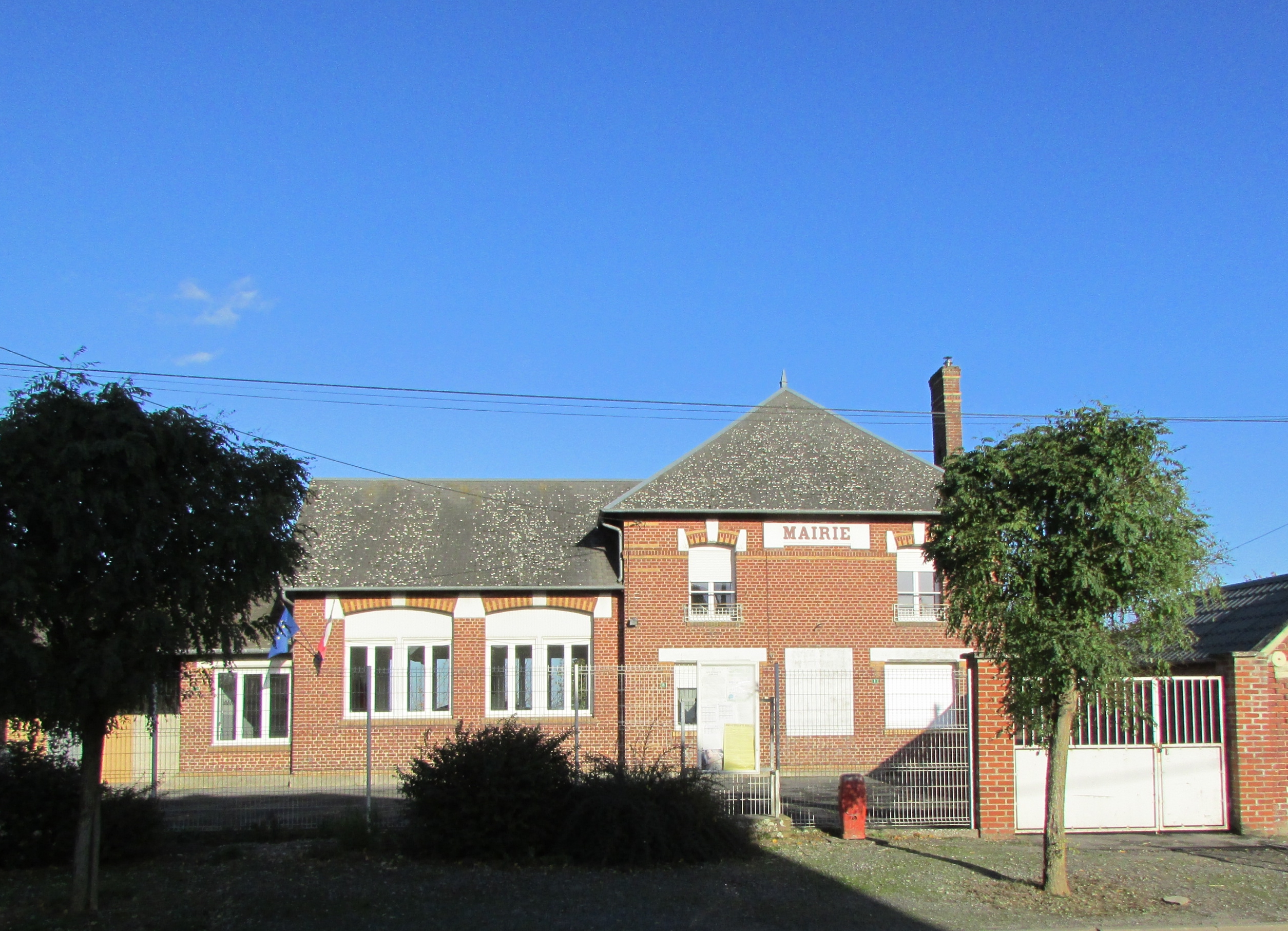
- The town hall in Hancourt
- Location of Hancourt
- Location within France Location within Hauts-de-France
- Coordinates: 49°54′14″N 3°04′24″E
- Country: France
- Region: Hauts-de-France
- Department: Somme
- Arrondissement: Péronne
- Canton: Péronne
- Intercommunality: Haute Somme

Government
  - Mayor (2020–2026): Philippe Waree
- Area^{1}: 4.06 km^{2} (1.57 sq mi)
- Elevation: 102 m (335 ft)
- Highest elevation: 110 m (360 ft)
- Lowest elevation: 82 m (269 ft)
- Population (2023): 94
  - Density: 23/km^{2} (60/sq mi)
- Time zone: UTC+01:00 (CET)
  - Summer (DST): UTC+02:00 (CEST)
- INSEE/Postal code: 80413 /80240
- ^{1} French Land Register data, which excludes lakes, ponds, glaciers > 1 km^{2} (0.386 sq mi or 247 acres) and river estuaries.

Hancourt (French pronunciation: [ɑ̃kuʁ]) is a commune in the Somme department in Hauts-de-France in northern France.

== Geography ==
Hancourt is situated on the D15 and D194 crossroads, some 10 miles (16 km) northwest of Saint-Quentin.

== History ==
Hancourt was the French village to which the 22 survivors of the 2/4th Battalion of the Oxfordshire and Buckinghamshire Light Infantry retreated in spring 1918, after the Battalion was virtually wiped out in action on the Western Front.

== Population ==
Historical population
Year	Pop.	±% p.a.
1968	132	—
1975	117	−1.71%
1982	92	−3.38%
1990	117	+3.05%
1999	100	−1.73%
2007	103	+0.37%
2012	102	−0.19%
2017	92	−2.04%
2023	94	+0.36%
Source: INSEE

== See also ==
- Communes of the Somme department
