= Épehy =

- Commune
- Coat of arms
- Location of Épehy
- Location within France Location within Hauts-de-France
- Coordinates: 50°00′30″N 3°07′45″E
- Country: France
- Region: Hauts-de-France
- Department: Somme
- Arrondissement: Péronne
- Canton: Péronne
- Intercommunality: Haute Somme

Government
  - Mayor (2020–2026): Jean-Michel Martin
- Area^{1}: 17.33 km^{2} (6.69 sq mi)
- Elevation: 141 m (463 ft)
- Highest elevation: 147 m (482 ft)
- Lowest elevation: 99 m (325 ft)
- Population (2023): 1,099
  - Density: 63.42/km^{2} (164.2/sq mi)
- Time zone: UTC+01:00 (CET)
  - Summer (DST): UTC+02:00 (CEST)
- INSEE/Postal code: 80271 /80740
- ^{1} French Land Register data, which excludes lakes, ponds, glaciers > 1 km^{2} (0.386 sq mi or 247 acres) and river estuaries.

Épehy (Picard: Épy ) is a commune in the Somme department in Hauts-de-France in northern France. Valentine Fleming died there in 1917.

== Geography ==
Épehy is situated in the northeast of the department, on the D24 and D58 roads some 23 km (14 mi) north-northwest of Saint-Quentin.

== Population ==
Historical population
Year	Pop.	±% p.a.
1968	1,175	—
1975	1,059	−1.47%
1982	1,079	+0.27%
1990	1,044	−0.41%
1999	1,088	+0.46%
2007	1,161	+0.82%
2012	1,232	+1.19%
2017	1,145	−1.45%
2023	1,099	−0.68%
Source: INSEE

== Places of interest ==
- Saint Nicholas's church
- The mairie
- The war memorial of the Battle of Épehy

== See also ==
- Communes of the Somme department
