= Maurepas, Somme =

Maurepas
- Commune
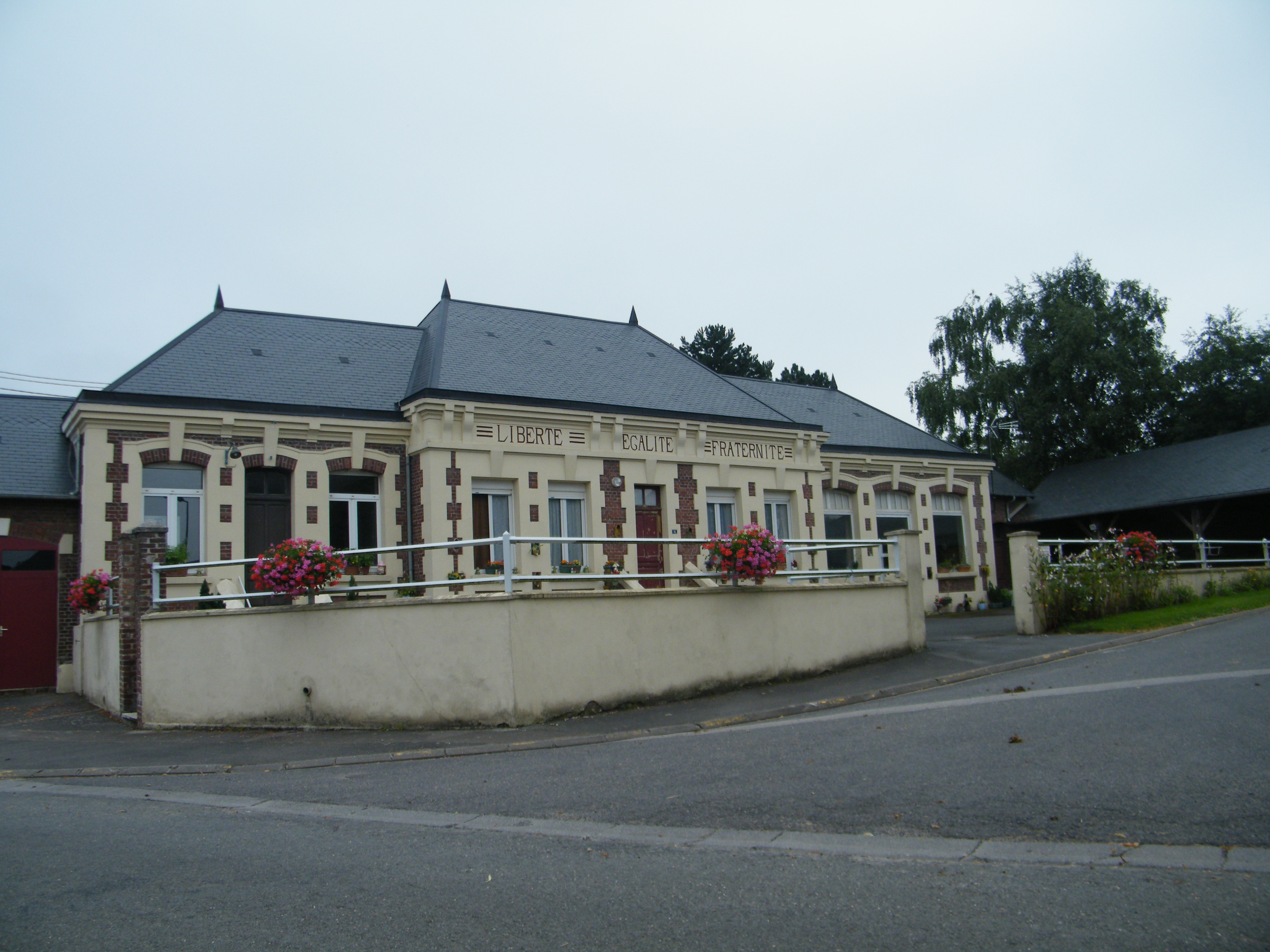
- The town hall and school in Maurepas
- Location of Maurepas
- Location within France Location within Hauts-de-France
- Coordinates: 49°59′25″N 2°50′52″E
- Country: France
- Region: Hauts-de-France
- Department: Somme
- Arrondissement: Péronne
- Canton: Péronne
- Intercommunality: Haute Somme

Government
  - Mayor (2020–2026): Bruno Fossé
- Area^{1}: 10.88 km^{2} (4.20 sq mi)
- Elevation: 69 m (226 ft)
- Highest elevation: 138 m (453 ft)
- Lowest elevation: 50 m (160 ft)
- Population (2023): 216
  - Density: 19.9/km^{2} (51.4/sq mi)
- Time zone: UTC+01:00 (CET)
  - Summer (DST): UTC+02:00 (CEST)
- INSEE/Postal code: 80521 /80360
- ^{1} French Land Register data, which excludes lakes, ponds, glaciers > 1 km^{2} (0.386 sq mi or 247 acres) and river estuaries.

Maurepas (French pronunciation: [moʁpa]) is a commune in the Somme department in Hauts-de-France in northern France.

== Geography ==
Maurepas is situated on the D146 road, some 50 km (31 mi) northeast of Amiens, about a mile from the A1 autoroute.

== Population ==
Historical population
Year	Pop.	±% p.a.
1968	283	—
1975	242	−2.21%
1982	216	−1.61%
1990	213	−0.17%
1999	215	+0.10%
2007	207	−0.47%
2012	198	−0.89%
2017	197	−0.10%
2023	216	+1.55%
Source: INSEE

== See also ==
- Communes of the Somme department
