= Canton of Acheux-en-Amiénois =

Coordinates: 50°4′27″N 2°32′1″E

Acheux-en-Amiénois
- Former canton
- Interactive map of Acheux-en-Amiénois
- Country: France
- Region: Hauts-de-France
- Department: Somme
- No. of communes: {{{nbcomm}}}
- Disbanded: 2015
- Area: 166.11 km^{2} (64.14 sq mi)
- Population (2012): 6,373
  - Density: 38.37/km^{2} (99.37/sq mi)

The Canton of Acheux-en-Amiénois is a former canton situated in the department of the Somme and in the former Picardy region of northern France. It was disbanded following the French canton reorganisation which came into effect in March 2015. It consisted of 26 communes, which joined the canton of Albert in 2015. It had 6,373 inhabitants (2012).

== Geography ==
The canton is organised around the commune of Acheux-en-Amiénois in the arrondissement of Amiens. The altitude varies from 63m at Toutencourt to 157m at Authie for an average of 129m.

The canton comprised 26 communes:

- Acheux-en-Amiénois
- Arquèves
- Authie
- Bayencourt
- Bertrancourt
- Bus-lès-Artois
- Coigneux
- Colincamps
- Courcelles-au-Bois
- Englebelmer
- Forceville
- Harponville
- Hédauville
- Hérissart
- Léalvillers
- Louvencourt
- Mailly-Maillet
- Marieux
- Puchevillers
- Raincheval
- Saint-Léger-lès-Authie
- Senlis-le-Sec
- Thièvres
- Toutencourt
- Varennes
- Vauchelles-lès-Authie

== Population ==
| 1962 | 1968 | 1975 | 1982 | 1990 | 1999 |
|---|---|---|---|---|---|
| 5947 | 6228 | 5895 | 5754 | 5730 | 5809 |
Census count starting from 1962 : Population without double counting

== See also ==
- Arrondissements of the Somme department
- Cantons of the Somme department
- Communes of the Somme department
