= Bertrancourt Military Cemetery =

CWGC WW1 cemetery in France

Bertrancourt Military Commission Cemetery
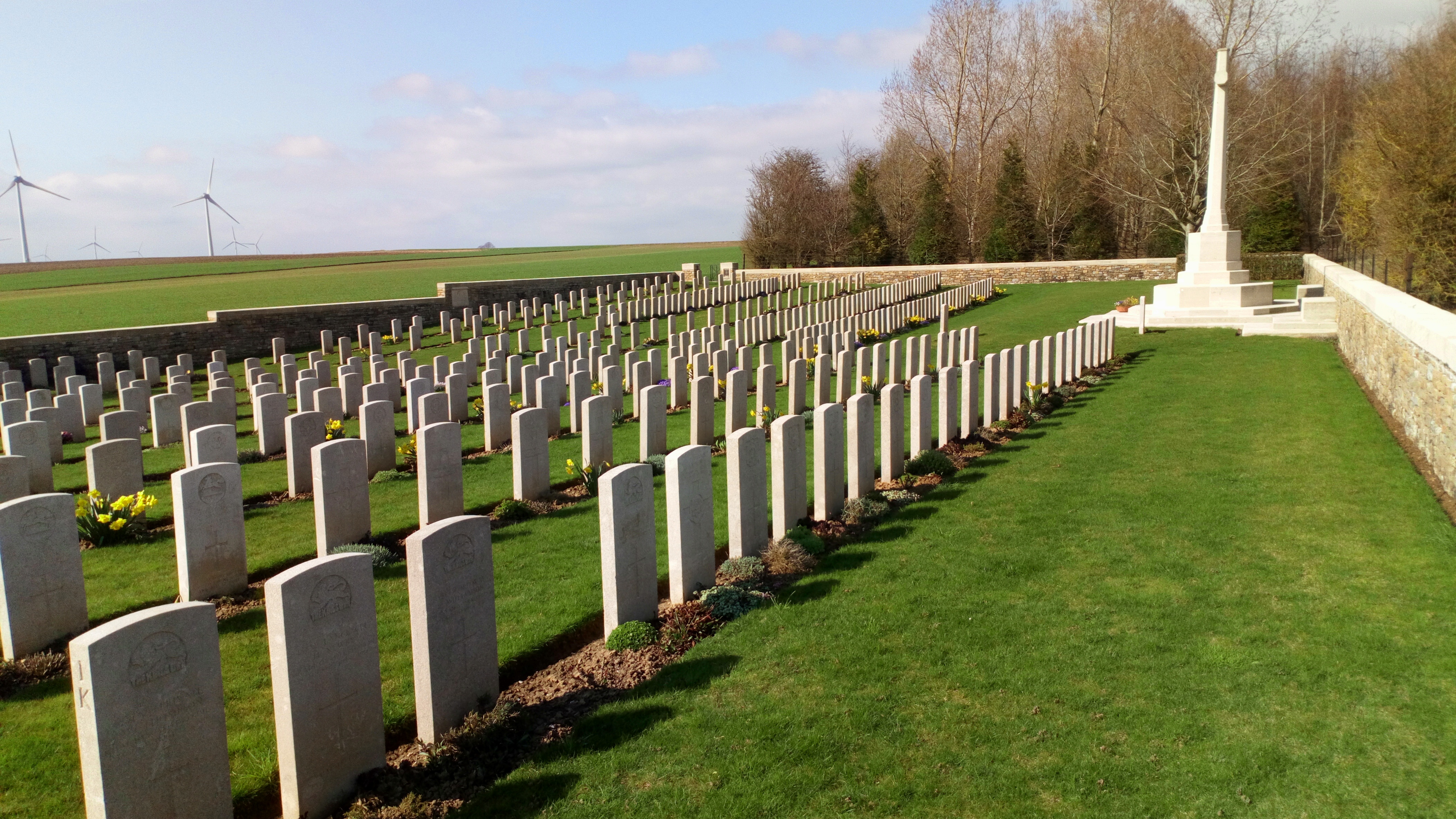

Details
- Established: 1916
- Location: Bertrancourt, Somme, France
- Country: British and Commonwealth
- Coordinates: 50°05′26″N 2°33′04″E
- Type: Military
- No. of graves: 416 total
- Website: cwgc.org
- Find a Grave: Bertrancourt Military Commission Cemetery

The Bertrancourt Military Cemetery is a cemetery located in the Somme region of France commemorating British and Commonwealth soldiers who fought in World War I. The cemetery is maintained by the Commonwealth War Graves Commission and contains mainly those who died on the front line near the village of Bertrancourt in 1916, 1917, and June–August 1918.

== Location ==
The cemetery is located southwest of Bertrancourt near the D114 road.

== Establishment of the Cemetery ==
The cemetery was begun by field ambulances in 1916 and was used throughout 1916 and 1917. It was reopened in June–August 1918 when German advances brought the front line within 8 kilometers of Bertrancourt. The cemetery was designed by Sir Reginald Blomfield and John Reginald Truelove.

=== Statistics ===
The cemetery contains a total of 416 Commonwealth burials from the First World War, all of which are identified. Many of the buried casualties come from the Yorkshire and Lancashire Regiments.

Identified Burials by Nationality
Nationality	Number of Burials
United Kingdom	387
New Zealand	27
Canada	2
Germany	2
