= Frise, Somme =

Frise
- Commune
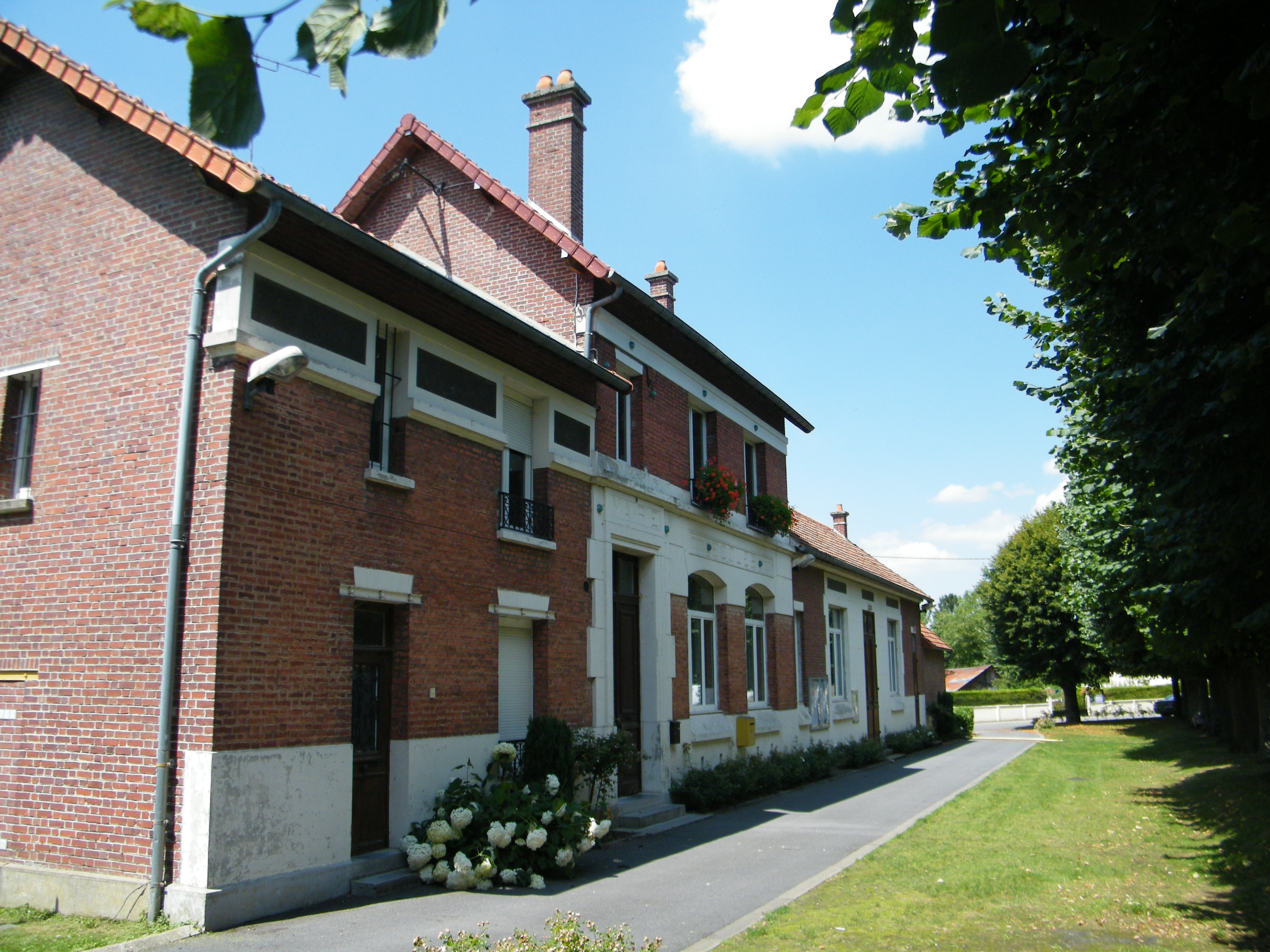
- The town hall in Frise

- Coat of arms
- Location of Frise
- Location within France Location within Hauts-de-France
- Coordinates: 49°56′32″N 2°49′09″E
- Country: France
- Region: Hauts-de-France
- Department: Somme
- Arrondissement: Péronne
- Canton: Albert
- Intercommunality: CC Pays du Coquelicot

Government
  - Mayor (2020–2026): Michel Randjia
- Area^{1}: 6.15 km^{2} (2.37 sq mi)
- Elevation: 50 m (160 ft)
- Highest elevation: 99 m (325 ft)
- Lowest elevation: 41 m (135 ft)
- Population (2023): 176
  - Density: 28.6/km^{2} (74.1/sq mi)
- Time zone: UTC+01:00 (CET)
  - Summer (DST): UTC+02:00 (CEST)
- INSEE/Postal code: 80367 /80340
- ^{1} French Land Register data, which excludes lakes, ponds, glaciers > 1 km^{2} (0.386 sq mi or 247 acres) and river estuaries.

Frise (French pronunciation: [fʁiz]) is a commune in the Somme department in Hauts-de-France in northern France.

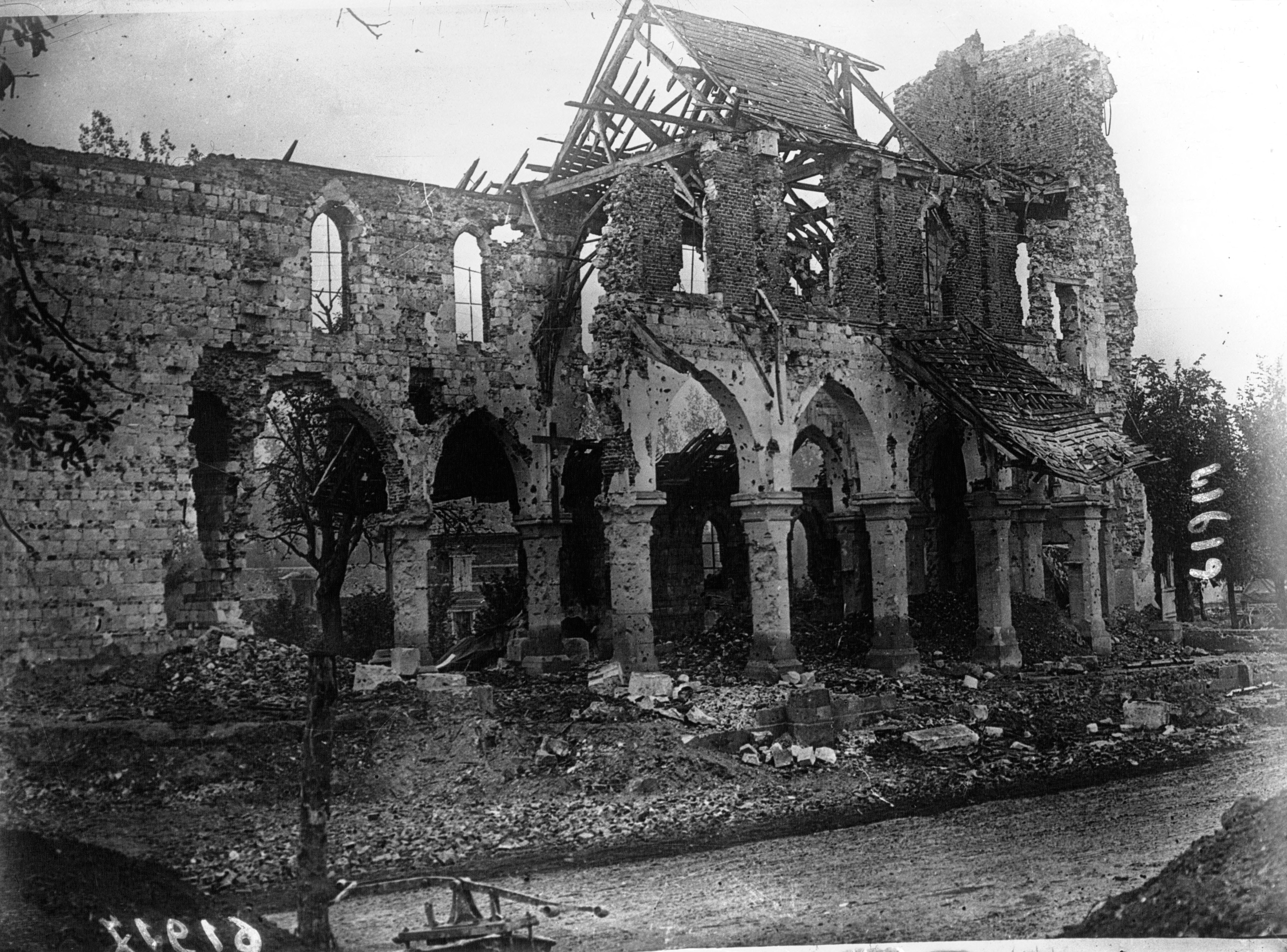
Church of Frise in 1916, after the Battle of the Somme.

== Geography ==
Frise is situated by the banks of the river Somme, on the D471 road, some 42 kilometres (26 mi) east of Amiens.

== Population ==
Historical population
Year	Pop.	±% p.a.
1968	145	—
1975	112	−3.62%
1982	131	+2.26%
1990	129	−0.19%
1999	158	+2.28%
2007	181	+1.71%
2012	189	+0.87%
2017	183	−0.64%
2023	176	−0.65%
Source: INSEE

== History ==
In the Middle Ages the village exploited the peat of the surrounding marshy lands. With so much fresh water, the fishing was, and still is very good in this aquatic environment.
Frise was on the front line for much of the First World War, notably the Battle of the Somme in 1916. The outline of trenches and shell holes is still visible today.

== See also ==
- Communes of the Somme department
