= Vauchelles-lès-Authie =

- Commune
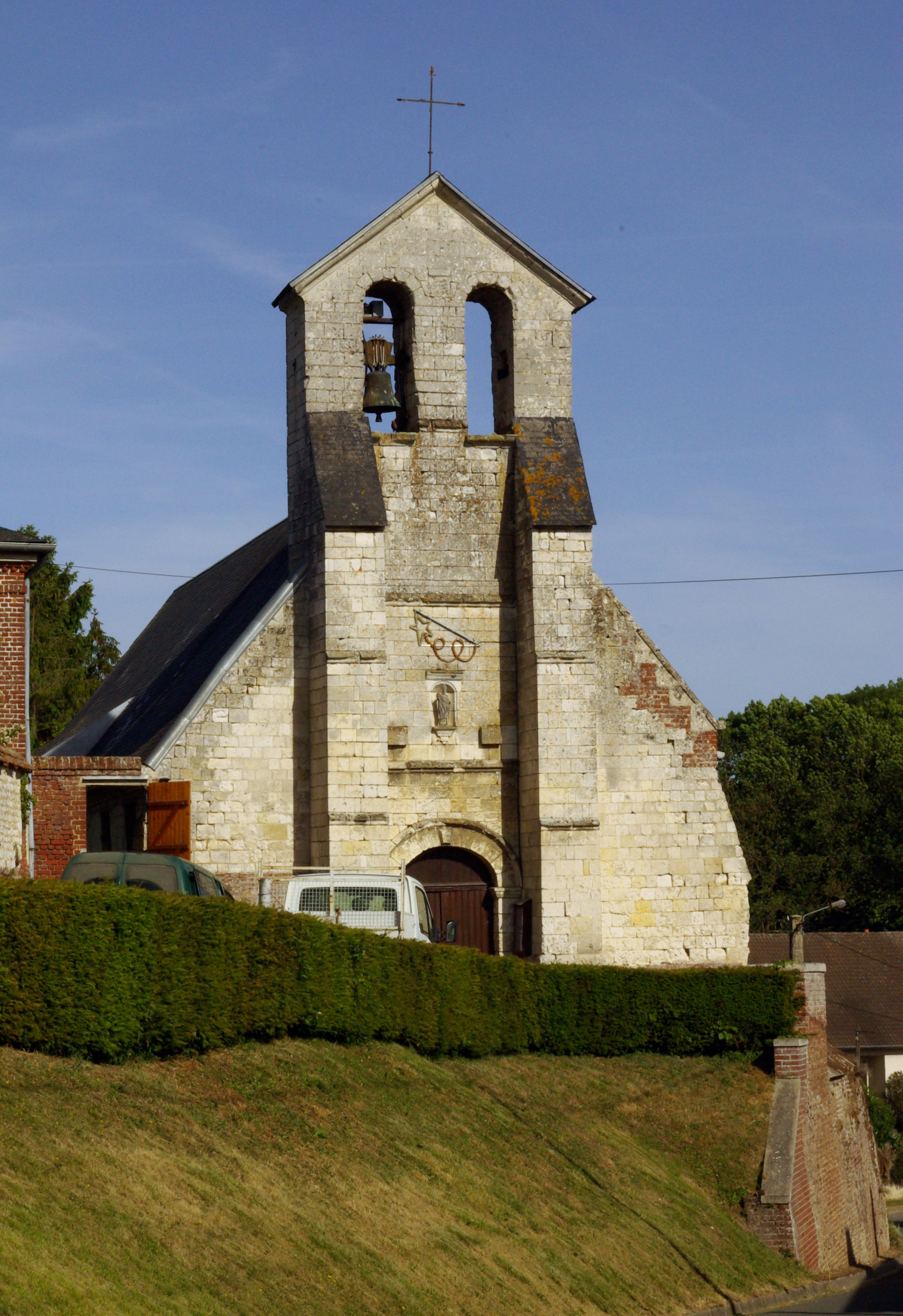
- The church in Vauchelles-lès-Authie
- Location of Vauchelles-lès-Authie
- Location within France Location within Hauts-de-France
- Coordinates: 50°05′54″N 2°28′32″E
- Country: France
- Region: Hauts-de-France
- Department: Somme
- Arrondissement: Péronne
- Canton: Albert
- Intercommunality: Pays du Coquelicot

Government
  - Mayor (2020–2026): Joris Ledoux
- Area^{1}: 4.7 km^{2} (1.8 sq mi)
- Elevation: 100 m (330 ft)
- Highest elevation: 143 m (469 ft)
- Lowest elevation: 83 m (272 ft)
- Population (2023): 132
  - Density: 28/km^{2} (73/sq mi)
- Time zone: UTC+01:00 (CET)
  - Summer (DST): UTC+02:00 (CEST)
- INSEE/Postal code: 80777 /80560
- ^{1} French Land Register data, which excludes lakes, ponds, glaciers > 1 km^{2} (0.386 sq mi or 247 acres) and river estuaries.

Vauchelles-lès-Authie (French pronunciation: [voʃɛl lɛ.z‿oti], literally Vauchelles near Authie) is a commune in the Somme department in Hauts-de-France in northern France.

== Geography ==
The commune is situated 15 miles (24 km) northeast of Amiens, on the D124 road

== Population ==
Historical population
Year	Pop.	±% p.a.
1968	175	—
1975	144	−2.75%
1982	130	−1.45%
1990	136	+0.57%
1999	113	−2.04%
2007	122	+0.96%
2012	140	+2.79%
2017	151	+1.52%
2023	132	−2.22%
Source: INSEE

== See also ==
- Communes of the Somme department
