= Carnoy-Mametz =

- Commune
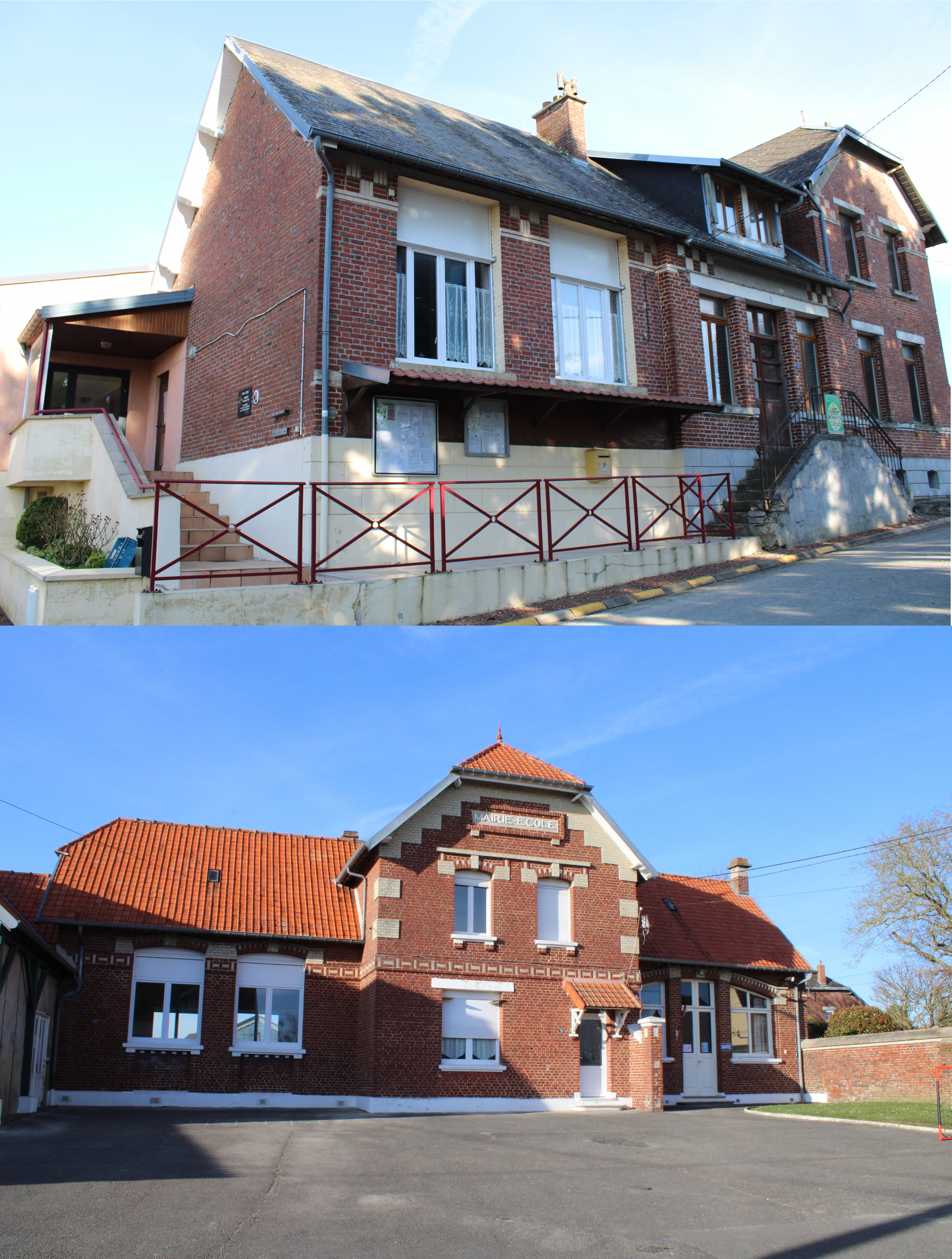
- Town halls

- Coat of arms
- Location of Carnoy-Mametz
- Location within France Location within Hauts-de-France
- Coordinates: 49°59′52″N 2°44′13″E
- Country: France
- Region: Hauts-de-France
- Department: Somme
- Arrondissement: Péronne
- Canton: Albert
- Intercommunality: Pays du Coquelicot

Government
  - Mayor (2020–2026): Stéphane Brunel
- Area^{1}: 10.25 km^{2} (3.96 sq mi)
- Elevation: 73 m (240 ft)
- Highest elevation: 135 m (443 ft)
- Lowest elevation: 68 m (223 ft)
- Population (2023): 255
  - Density: 24.9/km^{2} (64.4/sq mi)
- Time zone: UTC+01:00 (CET)
  - Summer (DST): UTC+02:00 (CEST)
- INSEE/Postal code: 80505 /80300
- ^{1} French Land Register data, which excludes lakes, ponds, glaciers > 1 km^{2} (0.386 sq mi or 247 acres) and river estuaries.

Carnoy-Mametz (French pronunciation: [kaʁnwa mame]) is a commune in the Somme department in Hauts-de-France in northern France. It was established on 1 January 2019 by merger of the former communes of Mametz (the seat) and Carnoy.

== See also ==
- Communes of the Somme department
