= Laviéville =

- Commune
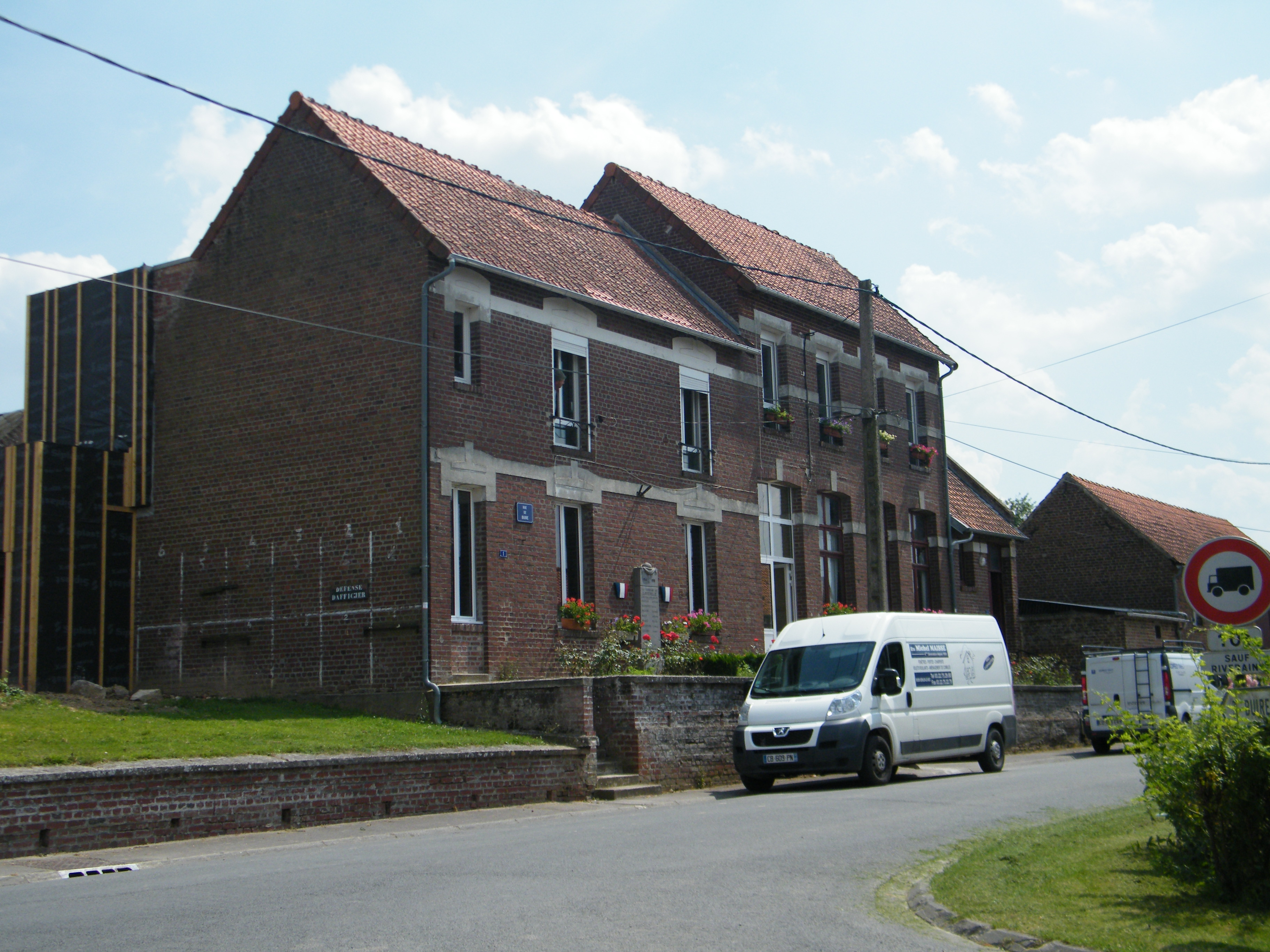
- The town hall in Laviéville
- Location of Laviéville
- Location within France Location within Hauts-de-France
- Coordinates: 49°59′30″N 2°34′36″E
- Country: France
- Region: Hauts-de-France
- Department: Somme
- Arrondissement: Péronne
- Canton: Albert
- Intercommunality: Pays du Coquelicot

Government
  - Mayor (2020–2026): Michel Watelain
- Area^{1}: 2.15 km^{2} (0.83 sq mi)
- Elevation: 100 m (330 ft)
- Highest elevation: 107 m (351 ft)
- Lowest elevation: 72 m (236 ft)
- Population (2023): 170
  - Density: 79/km^{2} (200/sq mi)
- Time zone: UTC+01:00 (CET)
  - Summer (DST): UTC+02:00 (CEST)
- INSEE/Postal code: 80468 /80300
- ^{1} French Land Register data, which excludes lakes, ponds, glaciers > 1 km^{2} (0.386 sq mi or 247 acres) and river estuaries.

Laviéville (French pronunciation: [lavjevil]; Picard: Lavièville) is a commune in the Somme department in Hauts-de-France in northern France.

== Geography ==
The commune is situated on the D119 road, some 16 miles (26 km) northeast of Amiens.

== Population ==
Historical population
Year	Pop.	±% p.a.
1968	104	—
1975	126	+2.78%
1982	129	+0.34%
1990	136	+0.66%
1999	134	−0.16%
2007	154	+1.75%
2012	165	+1.39%
2017	171	+0.72%
2023	170	−0.10%
Source: INSEE

== See also ==
- Communes of the Somme department
