= Pys =

- Commune
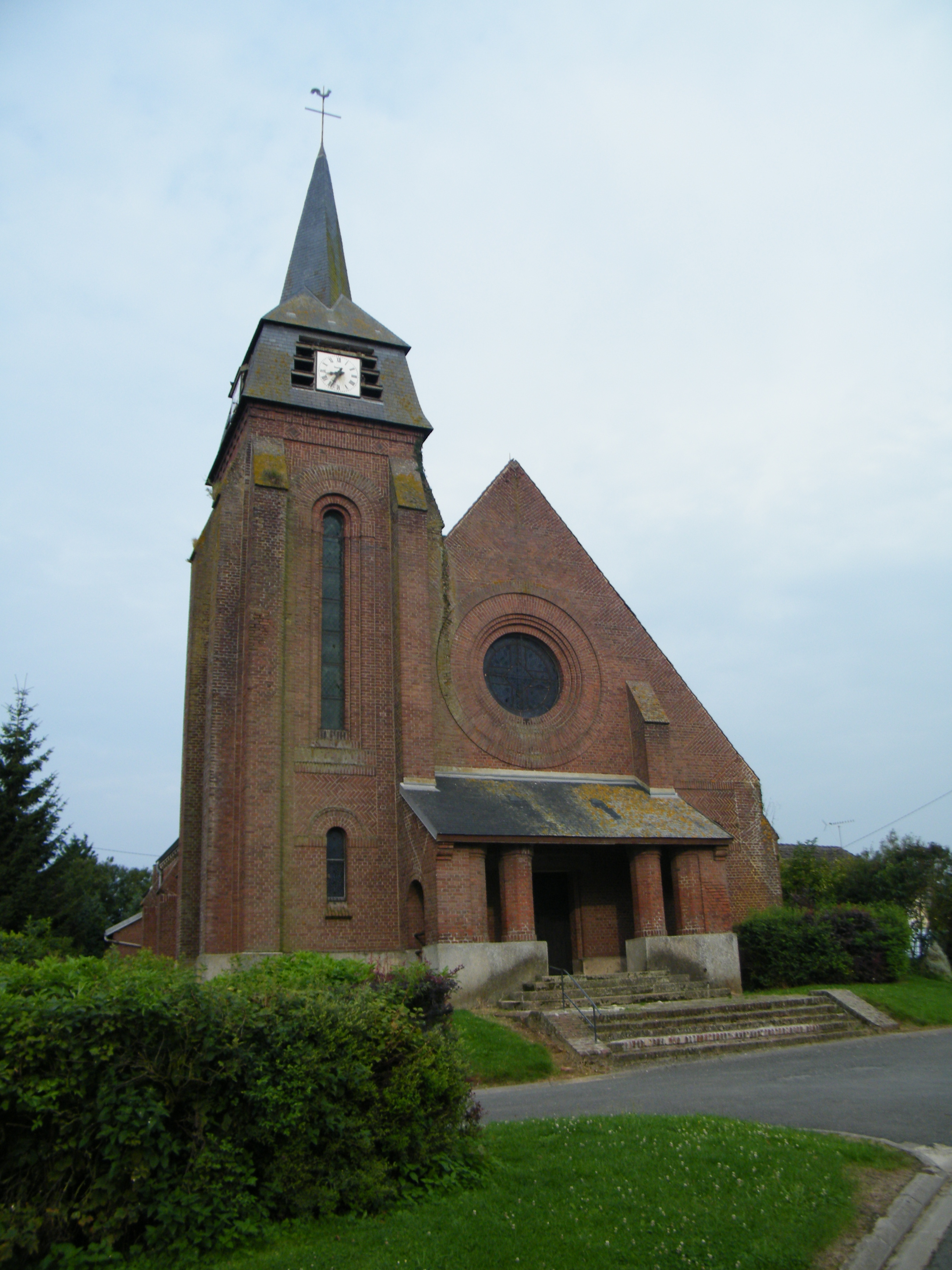
- The church in Pys
- Location of Pys
- Location within France Location within Hauts-de-France
- Coordinates: 50°05′16″N 2°45′27″E
- Country: France
- Region: Hauts-de-France
- Department: Somme
- Arrondissement: Péronne
- Canton: Albert
- Intercommunality: Pays du Coquelicot

Government
  - Mayor (2020–2026): Vincent Philippe
- Area^{1}: 5.05 km^{2} (1.95 sq mi)
- Elevation: 115 m (377 ft)
- Highest elevation: 133 m (436 ft)
- Lowest elevation: 87 m (285 ft)
- Population (2023): 125
  - Density: 24.8/km^{2} (64.1/sq mi)
- Time zone: UTC+01:00 (CET)
  - Summer (DST): UTC+02:00 (CEST)
- INSEE/Postal code: 80648 /80300
- ^{1} French Land Register data, which excludes lakes, ponds, glaciers > 1 km^{2} (0.386 sq mi or 247 acres) and river estuaries.

Pys is a commune in the Somme département in Hauts-de-France in northern France.

== Geography ==
Pys is situated on the D929 road, some 25 miles (40 km) north of Amiens, on the border with the Pas-de-Calais.

== Population ==
Historical population
Year	Pop.	±% p.a.
1968	120	—
1975	110	−1.24%
1982	97	−1.78%
1990	100	+0.38%
1999	82	−2.18%
2007	97	+2.12%
2012	117	+3.82%
2017	120	+0.51%
2023	125	+0.68%
Source: INSEE

== See also ==
- Communes of the Somme department
