= Saint-Léger-lès-Authie =

- Commune
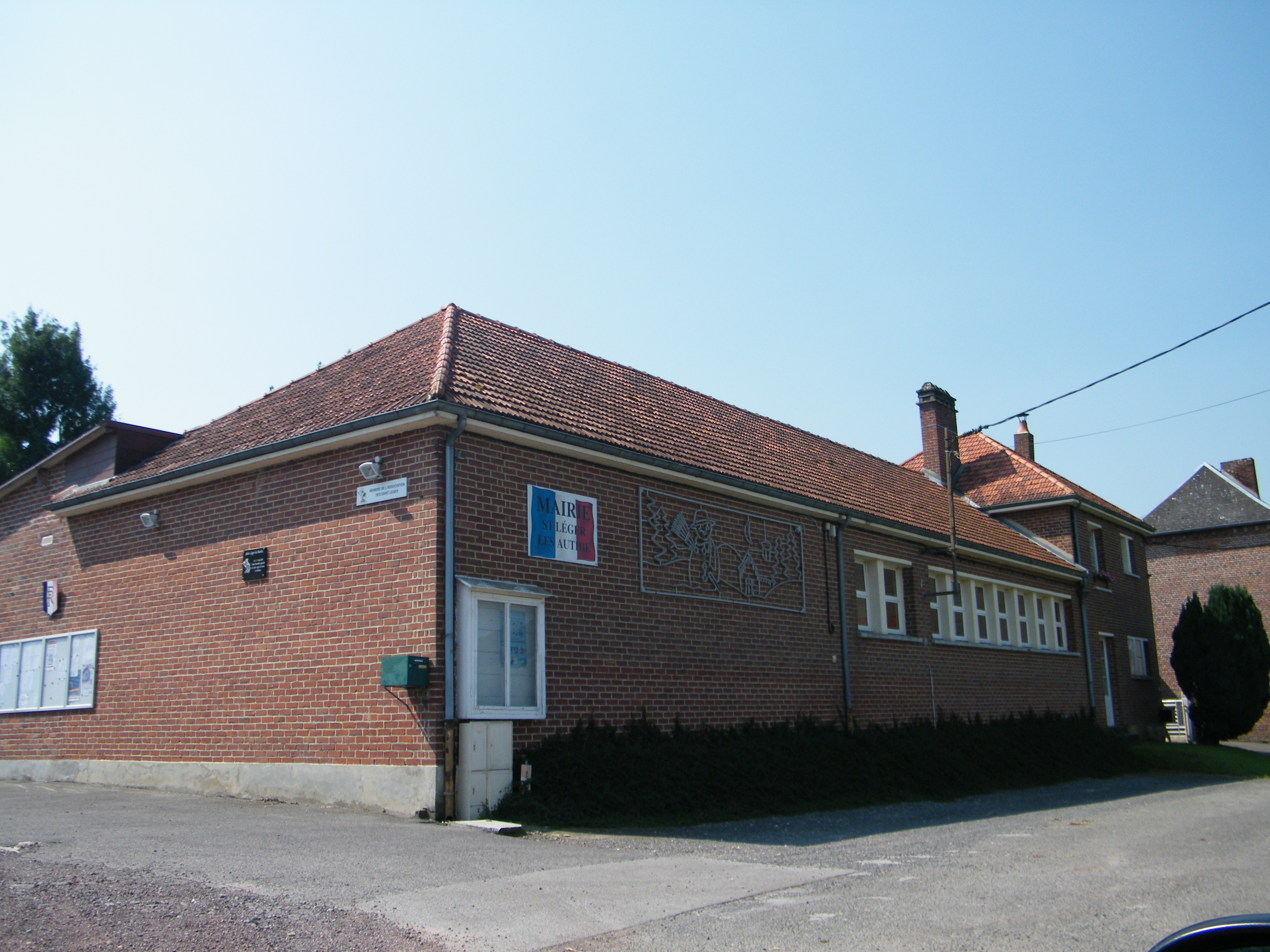
- The town hall and school in Saint-Léger-lès-Authie

- Coat of arms
- Location of Saint-Léger-lès-Authie
- Location within France Location within Hauts-de-France
- Coordinates: 50°07′37″N 2°30′47″E
- Country: France
- Region: Hauts-de-France
- Department: Somme
- Arrondissement: Péronne
- Canton: Albert
- Intercommunality: Pays du Coquelicot

Government
  - Mayor (2020–2026): Jean-Marie Guenez
- Area^{1}: 4.29 km^{2} (1.66 sq mi)
- Elevation: 96 m (315 ft)
- Highest elevation: 157 m (515 ft)
- Lowest elevation: 87 m (285 ft)
- Population (2023): 79
  - Density: 18/km^{2} (48/sq mi)
- Time zone: UTC+01:00 (CET)
  - Summer (DST): UTC+02:00 (CEST)
- INSEE/Postal code: 80705 /80560
- ^{1} French Land Register data, which excludes lakes, ponds, glaciers > 1 km^{2} (0.386 sq mi or 247 acres) and river estuaries.

Saint-Léger-lès-Authie (French pronunciation: [sɛ̃ leʒe lɛz‿oti], literally Saint-Léger near Authie; Picard: Saint-Njèr-lès-Eutie) is a commune in the Somme department in Hauts-de-France in northern France.

== Geography ==
The commune is situated some 17 miles (27 km) northeast of Amiens, on the D152 road and on the banks of the Authie, the border with the Pas-de-Calais.

== Population ==
Historical population
Year	Pop.	±% p.a.
1968	102	—
1975	88	−2.09%
1982	82	−1.00%
1990	92	+1.45%
1999	98	+0.70%
2007	90	−1.06%
2012	90	+0.00%
2017	89	−0.22%
2023	79	−1.97%
Source: INSEE

== See also ==
- Communes of the Somme department
