= Millencourt =

- Commune
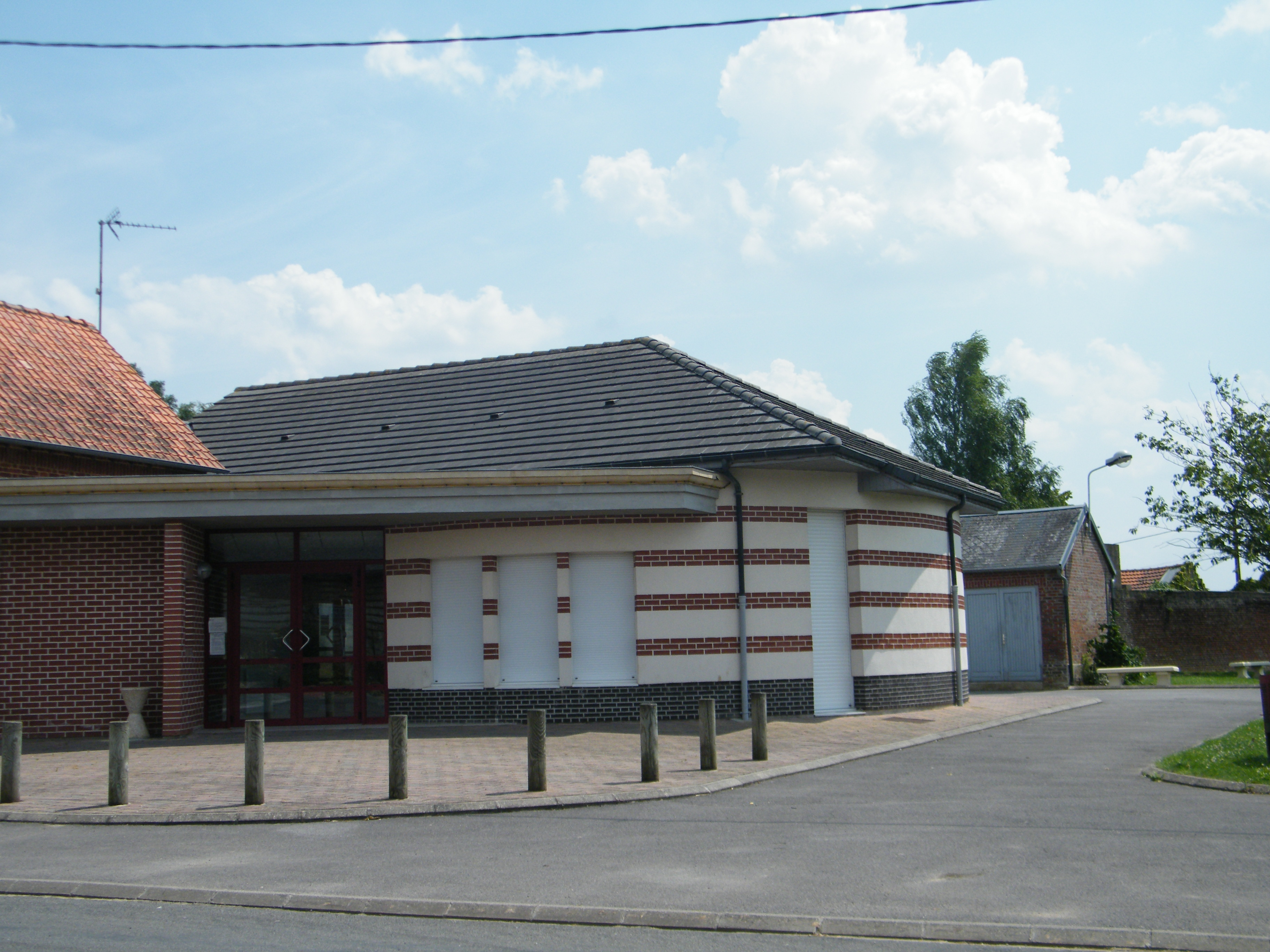
- The town hall in Millencourt
- Location of Millencourt
- Location within France Location within Hauts-de-France
- Coordinates: 50°00′07″N 2°35′14″E
- Country: France
- Region: Hauts-de-France
- Department: Somme
- Arrondissement: Péronne
- Canton: Albert
- Intercommunality: Pays du Coquelicot

Government
  - Mayor (2020–2026): Thierry Sergeant
- Area^{1}: 5.79 km^{2} (2.24 sq mi)
- Elevation: 90 m (300 ft)
- Highest elevation: 120 m (390 ft)
- Lowest elevation: 59 m (194 ft)
- Population (2023): 202
  - Density: 34.9/km^{2} (90.4/sq mi)
- Time zone: UTC+01:00 (CET)
  - Summer (DST): UTC+02:00 (CEST)
- INSEE/Postal code: 80547 /80300
- ^{1} French Land Register data, which excludes lakes, ponds, glaciers > 1 km^{2} (0.386 sq mi or 247 acres) and river estuaries.

Millencourt is a commune in the Somme department in Hauts-de-France in northern France.

== Geography ==
Millencourt is situated on the D91 road, some 22 miles (35 km) northeast of Amiens.

== Population ==
Historical population
Year	Pop.	±% p.a.
1968	172	—
1975	199	+2.10%
1982	207	+0.56%
1990	196	−0.68%
1999	217	+1.14%
2007	226	+0.51%
2012	227	+0.09%
2017	211	−1.45%
2023	202	−0.72%
Source: INSEE

== See also ==
- Communes of the Somme department
