= Ville-sur-Ancre =

- Commune
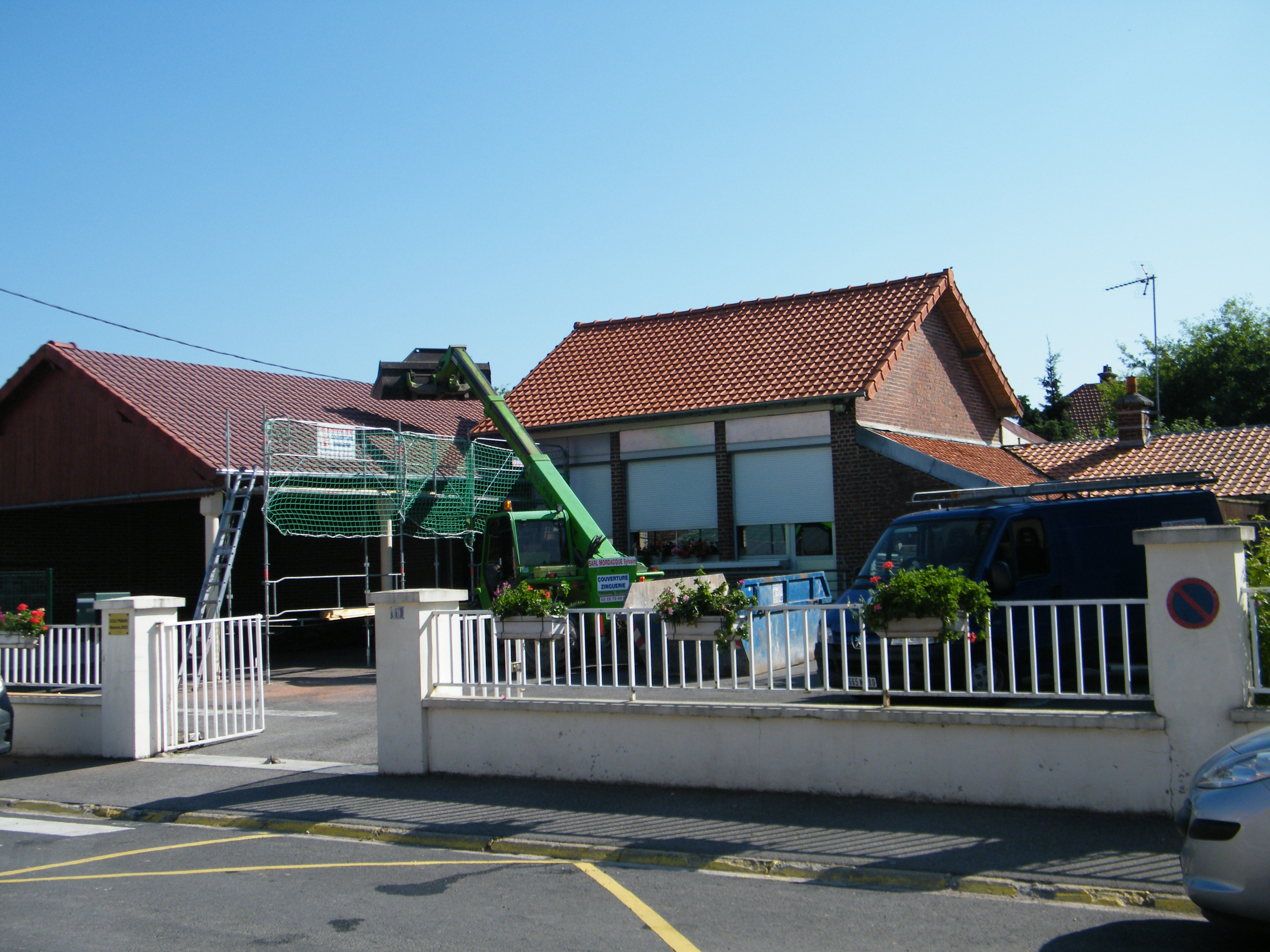
- The school in Ville-sur-Ancre

- Coat of arms
- Location of Ville-sur-Ancre
- Location within France Location within Hauts-de-France
- Coordinates: 49°57′47″N 2°36′45″E
- Country: France
- Region: Hauts-de-France
- Department: Somme
- Arrondissement: Péronne
- Canton: Albert
- Intercommunality: CC Pays du Coquelicot
- Area^{1}: 5.95 km^{2} (2.30 sq mi)
- Elevation: 50 m (160 ft)
- Highest elevation: 110 m (360 ft)
- Population (2023): 281
  - Density: 47.2/km^{2} (122/sq mi)
- Time zone: UTC+01:00 (CET)
  - Summer (DST): UTC+02:00 (CEST)
- INSEE/Postal code: 80807 /80300
- ^{1} French Land Register data, which excludes lakes, ponds, glaciers > 1 km^{2} (0.386 sq mi or 247 acres) and river estuaries.

Ville-sur-Ancre (French pronunciation: [vil syʁ ɑ̃kʁ]; Picard: Ville-su-Inke) is a commune in the Somme department in Hauts-de-France in northern France.

== See also ==
- Communes of the Somme department
