= Communauté de communes du Pays du Coquelicot =

Federation of municipalities in France

Coordinates: 50.00°N 2.65°E

Pays du Coquelicot
- Communauté de communes
- Country: France
- Region: Hauts-de-France
- Department: Somme
- No. of communes: {{{nbcomm}}}
- Established: 2001

Government
  - President: Michel Watelain
- Area: 464.0 km^{2} (179.2 sq mi)
- Population (2018): 28,302
  - Density: 61.00/km^{2} (158.0/sq mi)
- Website: www.paysducoquelicot.com

The Communauté de communes du Pays du Coquelicot is a communauté de communes in the Somme département and in the Hauts-de-France région of France. Its population is 28,302 (2018).

== Composition ==
The communauté de communes consists of the following 65 communes:

1. Acheux-en-Amiénois
2. Albert
3. Arquèves
4. Auchonvillers
5. Authie
6. Authuille
7. Aveluy
8. Bayencourt
9. Bazentin
10. Beaucourt-sur-l'Ancre
11. Beaumont-Hamel
12. Bécordel-Bécourt
13. Bertrancourt
14. Bouzincourt
15. Bray-sur-Somme
16. Buire-sur-l'Ancre
17. Bus-lès-Artois
18. Cappy
19. Carnoy-Mametz
20. Chuignolles
21. Coigneux
22. Colincamps
23. Contalmaison
24. Courcelette
25. Courcelles-au-Bois
26. Curlu
27. Dernancourt
28. Éclusier-Vaux
29. Englebelmer
30. Étinehem-Méricourt
31. Forceville
32. Fricourt
33. Frise
34. Grandcourt
35. Harponville
36. Hédauville
37. Hérissart
38. Irles
39. Laviéville
40. Léalvillers
41. Louvencourt
42. Mailly-Maillet
43. Maricourt
44. Marieux
45. Méaulte
46. Mesnil-Martinsart
47. Millencourt
48. Miraumont
49. Montauban-de-Picardie
50. Morlancourt
51. La Neuville-lès-Bray
52. Ovillers-la-Boisselle
53. Pozières
54. Puchevillers
55. Pys
56. Raincheval
57. Saint-Léger-lès-Authie
58. Senlis-le-Sec
59. Suzanne
60. Thiepval
61. Thièvres
62. Toutencourt
63. Varennes, Somme
64. Vauchelles-lès-Authie
65. Ville-sur-Ancre

== Responsibilities ==
The communes of the communauté delegate their representatives with the following responsibilities:

- Establishment of a joint development zone
- Help for the communes in the development of their town planning documents.
- Economic and land use planning
- Studies, programming, land acquisition and creation of the air industry in Haute Picardie and an economic area near Méaulte.
- Acquisition of land, planning and management of areas of community interest of more than 1 hectare.
- Studies on water quality.
- Studies on flood control
- Collection, treatment and recovery of household waste.
- Studies and action from residents for the schedule for improving housing.
- Information from landlords and tenants for local housing
- Creation or alteration and maintenance of roads in the public domain known as "intercommunal" defined on the basis of
  criteria including: School routes, business roads and tourist paths.
- Removal of snow on the roads
- Financing of the local mission
- Workshops during the school holidays.
- Leisure centre with or without accommodation centres for the young
- Music Schools
- Library
- Creation of a community newspaper
- Transportation
- Fishing Schools
- Promoting tourism and hospitality.
- Maintenance of hiking routes defined by the Department

== Budget and Taxation ==
The Community is funded by:

- Single business tax (at a rate of 10.29% in 2006), which replaces the taxes previously collected by the communes.
- A refuse collection tax.

== Economic Development ==
- 'Platform aero-industrial' to be carried out as a joint project with the Department of the Somme.
  The project costs of €40 million is to be funded by the European Union (22.5%), the region Picardie (30%), the département (30%),
  Airbus (11.25%) and the communauté (6.25%). As such, the communauté will pay €468,000 in 2008.
- The business park at Albert.
- The draft joint development zone located between Méaulte and Bécordel-Bécourt between Airbus and the airport at Albert.

== Wind power development ==
The Community Council of 12 November 2007 approved a draft covering 19 communes, mainly in the north of the territory,
which could accommodate wind turbines, if the Prefect approves the application.

== See also ==
- Communes of the Somme department
