= Chuignolles =

- Commune
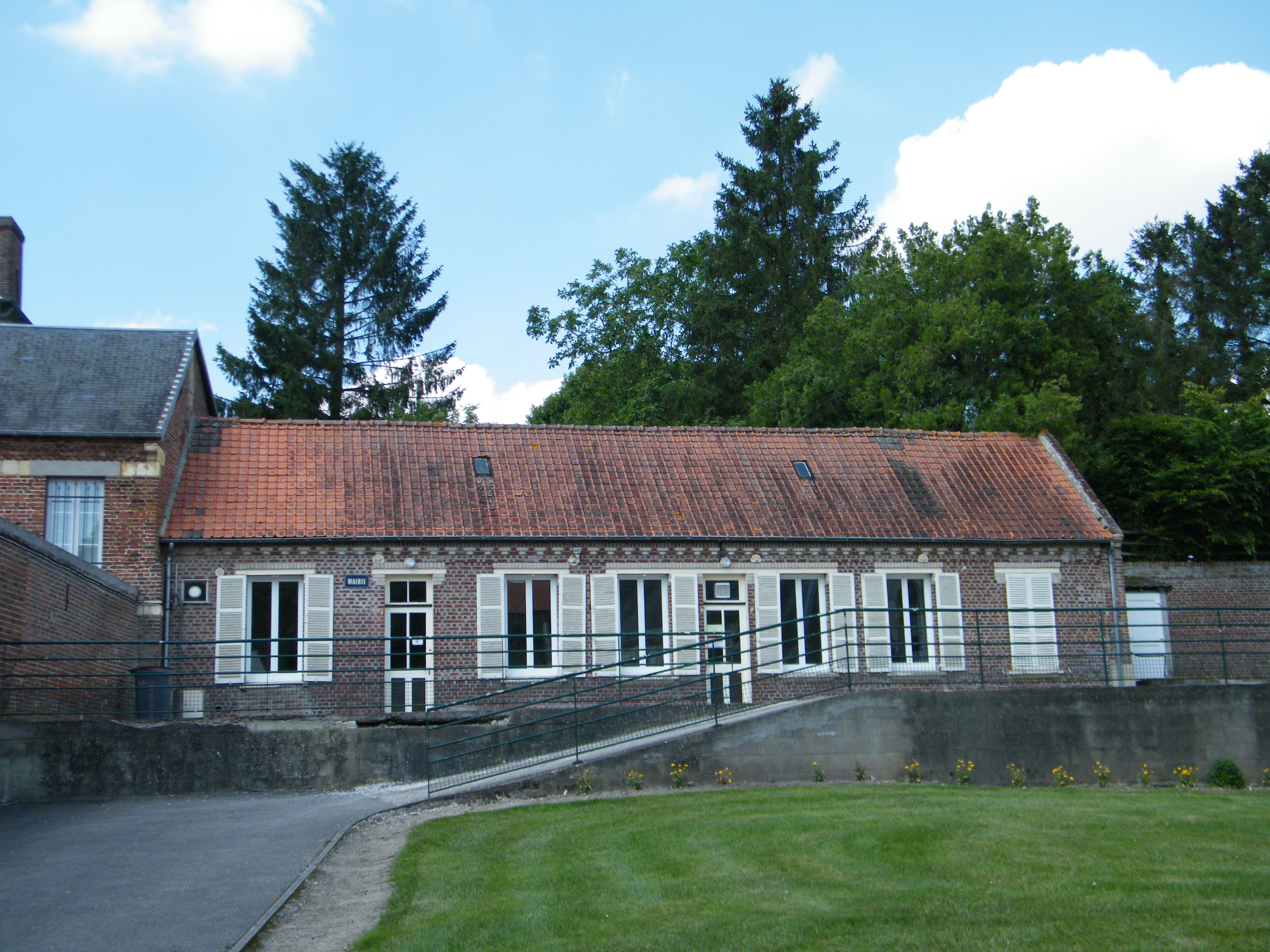
- The town hall in Chuignolles
- Location of Chuignolles
- Location within France Location within Hauts-de-France
- Coordinates: 49°54′06″N 2°43′38″E
- Country: France
- Region: Hauts-de-France
- Department: Somme
- Arrondissement: Péronne
- Canton: Albert
- Intercommunality: Pays du Coquelicot

Government
  - Mayor (2020–2026): Ghislain Lagache
- Area^{1}: 4.86 km^{2} (1.88 sq mi)
- Elevation: 83 m (272 ft)
- Highest elevation: 88 m (289 ft)
- Lowest elevation: 36 m (118 ft)
- Population (2023): 147
  - Density: 30.2/km^{2} (78.3/sq mi)
- Time zone: UTC+01:00 (CET)
  - Summer (DST): UTC+02:00 (CEST)
- INSEE/Postal code: 80195 /80340
- ^{1} French Land Register data, which excludes lakes, ponds, glaciers > 1 km^{2} (0.386 sq mi or 247 acres) and river estuaries.

Chuignolles (French pronunciation: [ʃɥiɲɔl]; Picard: Chugnole ) is a commune in the Somme department in Hauts-de-France in northern France.

== Geography ==
Chuignolles is situated on the D143 and D71 junction, which is near the banks of the river Somme, approximately 20 miles (32 km) east of Amiens.

== Population ==
Historical population
Year	Pop.	±% p.a.
1968	182	—
1975	199	+1.28%
1982	192	−0.51%
1990	156	−2.56%
1999	137	−1.43%
2007	153	+1.39%
2012	158	+0.65%
2017	152	−0.77%
2023	147	−0.56%
Source: INSEE

== See also ==
- Communes of the Somme department
