= Hédauville =

- Commune
- The town hall in Hédauville
- Location of Hédauville
- Location within France Location within Hauts-de-France
- Coordinates: 50°02′46″N 2°34′07″E
- Country: France
- Region: Hauts-de-France
- Department: Somme
- Arrondissement: Péronne
- Canton: Albert
- Intercommunality: Pays du Coquelicot

Government
  - Mayor (2020–2026): Patrice Basserie
- Area^{1}: 4.04 km^{2} (1.56 sq mi)
- Elevation: 99 m (325 ft)
- Highest elevation: 142 m (466 ft)
- Lowest elevation: 83 m (272 ft)
- Population (2023): 106
  - Density: 26.2/km^{2} (68.0/sq mi)
- Time zone: UTC+01:00 (CET)
  - Summer (DST): UTC+02:00 (CEST)
- INSEE/Postal code: 80425 /80560
- ^{1} French Land Register data, which excludes lakes, ponds, glaciers > 1 km^{2} (0.386 sq mi or 247 acres) and river estuaries.

Hédauville (French pronunciation: [edovil]; Picard: Hédeuville) is a commune in the Somme department in Hauts-de-France in northern France.

== Geography ==
Hédauville is situated on the D938 and D919 crossroads, some 20 miles (32 km) northeast of Amiens.

== History ==
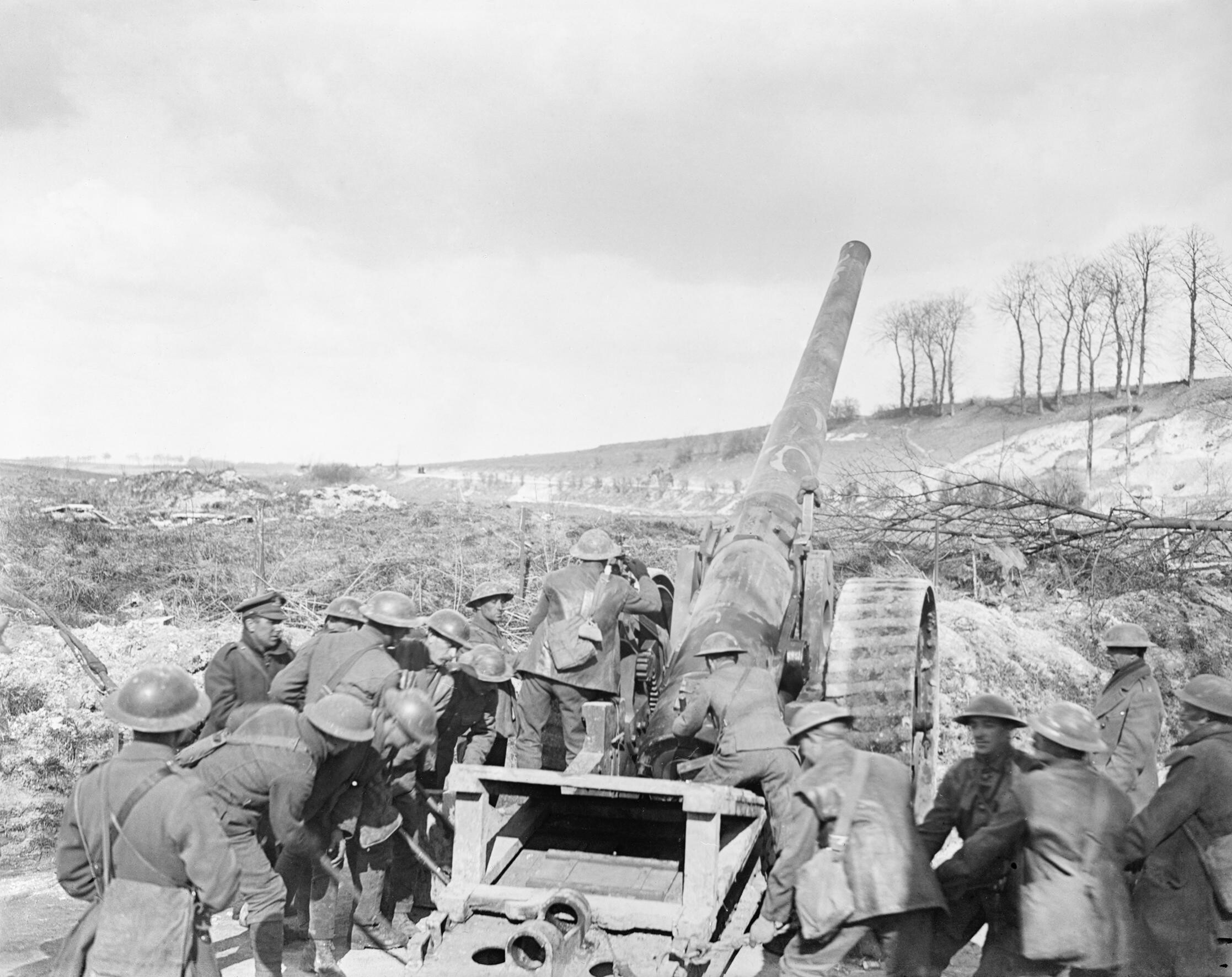
British 6 inch Mk VII gun in action behind a chalk ridge near Hédauville, west of the Ancre, 4.5 miles NW of Albert, France. It is firing in V Corps sector against the first phase of the German Kaiserschlacht offensive, Operation Michael, 26 March 1918.

== Population ==
Historical population
| Year | Pop. | ±% p.a. |
|---|---|---|
| 1968 | 123 | — |
| 1975 | 97 | −3.34% |
| 1982 | 98 | +0.15% |
| 1990 | 89 | −1.20% |
| 1999 | 100 | +1.30% |
| 2007 | 106 | +0.73% |
| 2012 | 115 | +1.64% |
| 2017 | 126 | +1.84% |
| 2023 | 106 | −2.84% |
Source: INSEE

== See also ==
- Communes of the Somme department
