= Bayencourt =

- Commune
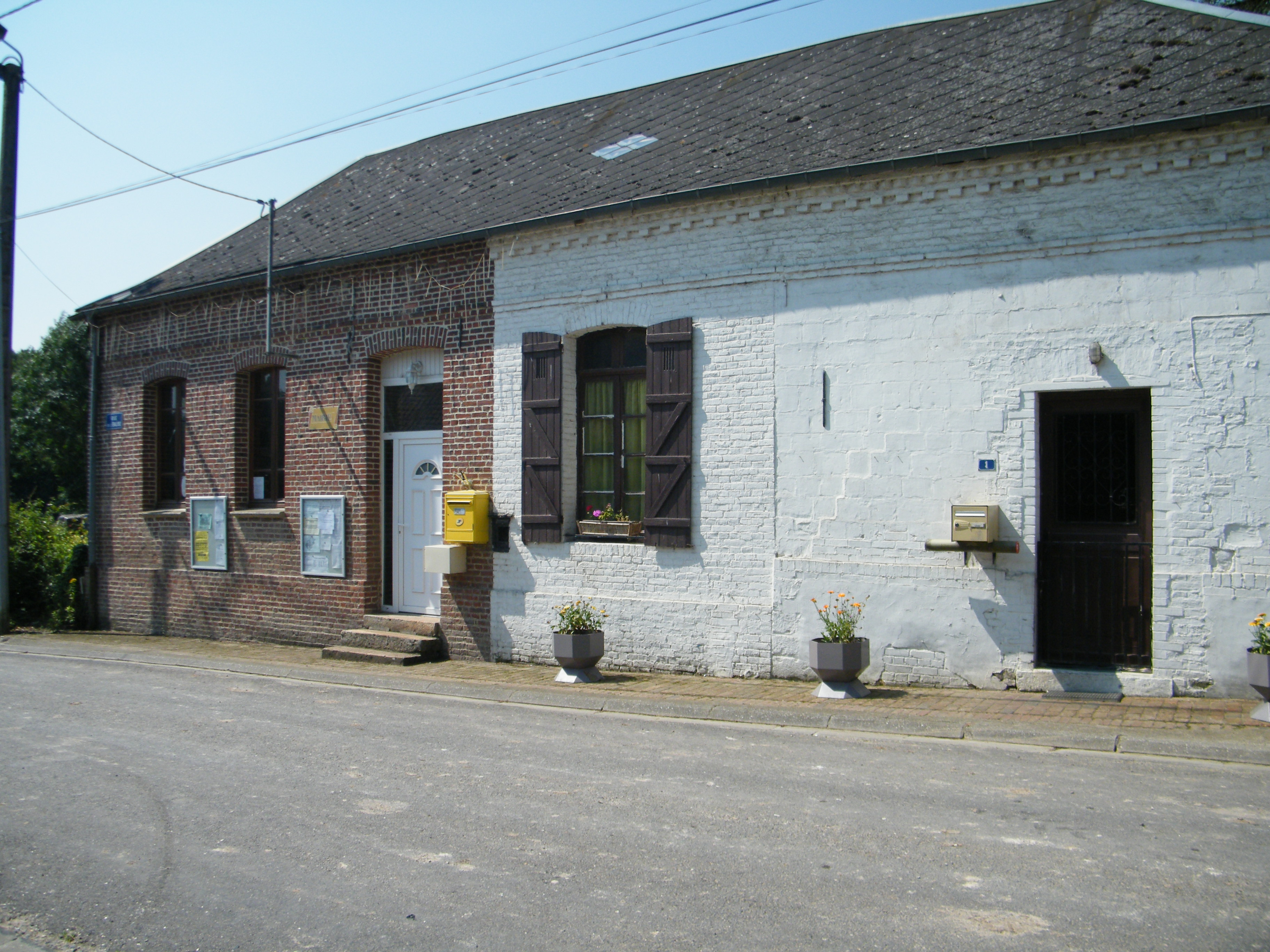
- The town hall of Bayencourt
- Location of Bayencourt
- Location within France Location within Hauts-de-France
- Coordinates: 50°07′57″N 2°34′26″E
- Country: France
- Region: Hauts-de-France
- Department: Somme
- Arrondissement: Péronne
- Canton: Albert
- Intercommunality: CC du Pays du Coquelicot

Government
  - Mayor (2020–2026): Virginie Adamczyk
- Area^{1}: 1.84 km^{2} (0.71 sq mi)
- Elevation: 200 m (660 ft)
- Highest elevation: 157 m (515 ft)
- Lowest elevation: 110 m (360 ft)
- Population (2023): 70
  - Density: 38/km^{2} (99/sq mi)
- Time zone: UTC+01:00 (CET)
  - Summer (DST): UTC+02:00 (CEST)
- INSEE/Postal code: 80057 /80560
- ^{1} French Land Register data, which excludes lakes, ponds, glaciers > 1 km^{2} (0.386 sq mi or 247 acres) and river estuaries.

Bayencourt is a commune in the Somme department in Hauts-de-France in northern France.

== Geography ==
A very small village, situated on the junction of the D23 and D129 roads, about halfway between Arras and Amiens.

== Population ==
Historical population
Year	Pop.	±% p.a.
1968	76	—
1975	70	−1.17%
1982	72	+0.40%
1990	64	−1.46%
1999	73	+1.47%
2007	74	+0.17%
2012	83	+2.32%
2017	79	−0.98%
2023	70	−2.00%
Source: INSEE

== See also ==
- Communes of the Somme department
