= Coigneux =

- Commune
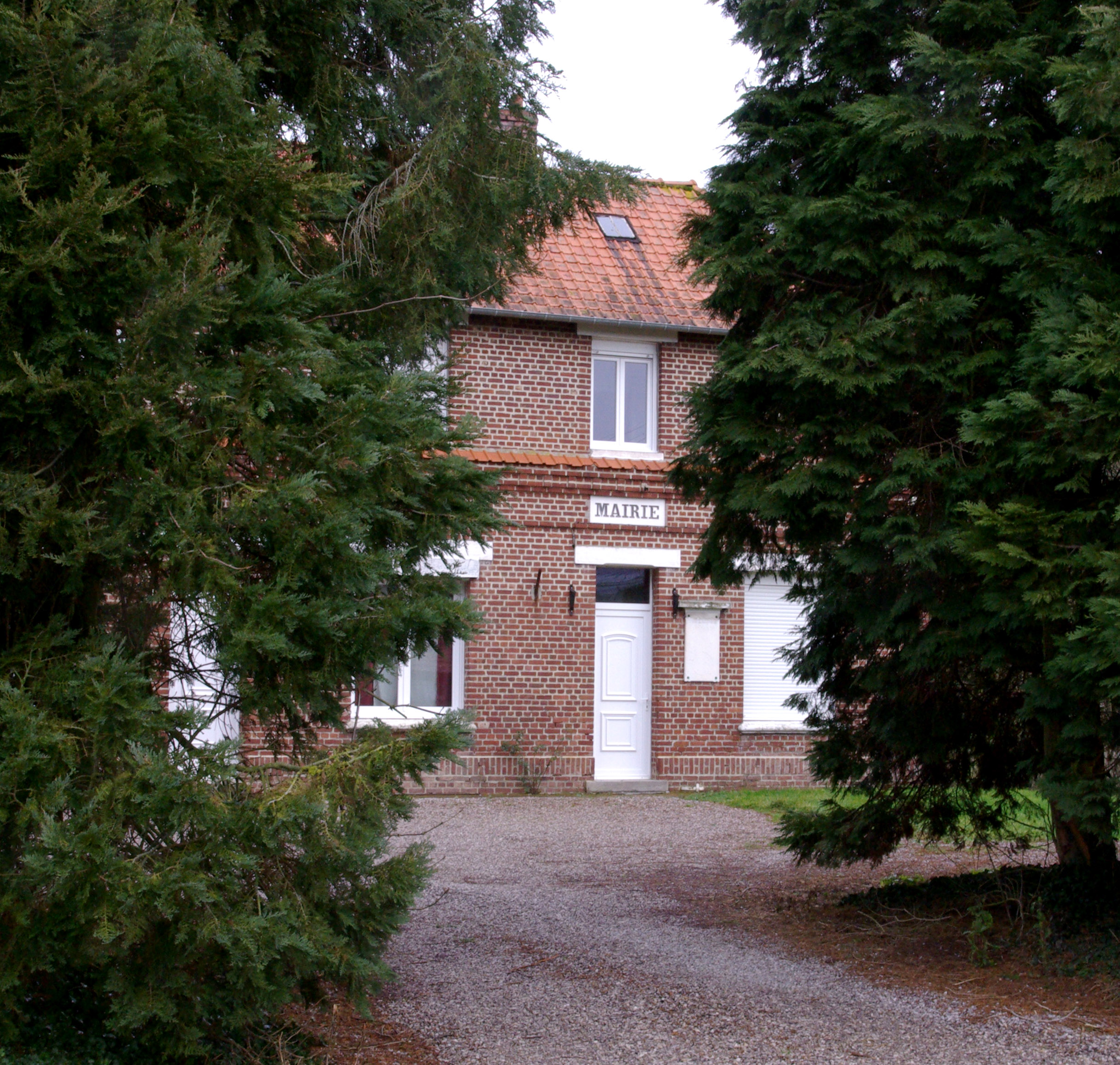
- The town hall in Coigneux
- Location of Coigneux
- Location within France Location within Hauts-de-France
- Coordinates: 50°07′50″N 2°33′09″E
- Country: France
- Region: Hauts-de-France
- Department: Somme
- Arrondissement: Péronne
- Canton: Albert
- Intercommunality: Pays du Coquelicot

Government
  - Mayor (2020–2026): Alain Laignel
- Area^{1}: 2.88 km^{2} (1.11 sq mi)
- Elevation: 107 m (351 ft)
- Highest elevation: 150 m (490 ft)
- Lowest elevation: 100 m (330 ft)
- Population (2023): 45
  - Density: 16/km^{2} (40/sq mi)
- Time zone: UTC+01:00 (CET)
  - Summer (DST): UTC+02:00 (CEST)
- INSEE/Postal code: 80201 /80560
- ^{1} French Land Register data, which excludes lakes, ponds, glaciers > 1 km^{2} (0.386 sq mi or 247 acres) and river estuaries.

Coigneux (pronounced [kwa.ɲø]; Picard: Cognu) is a commune in the Somme department and Hauts-de-France region of northern France.

== Geography ==
Coigneux is situated on the D176 road, some 22 miles (35 km) northeast of Amiens. The source of the Authie river is found here.

== Population ==
Historical population
| Year | Pop. | ±% p.a. |
|---|---|---|
| 1968 | 86 | — |
| 1975 | 71 | −2.70% |
| 1982 | 64 | −1.47% |
| 1990 | 56 | −1.66% |
| 1999 | 50 | −1.25% |
| 2007 | 46 | −1.04% |
| 2012 | 50 | +1.68% |
| 2017 | 49 | −0.40% |
| 2023 | 45 | −1.41% |
Source: INSEE

== See also ==
- Communes of the Somme department
