= Bus-lès-Artois =

- Commune
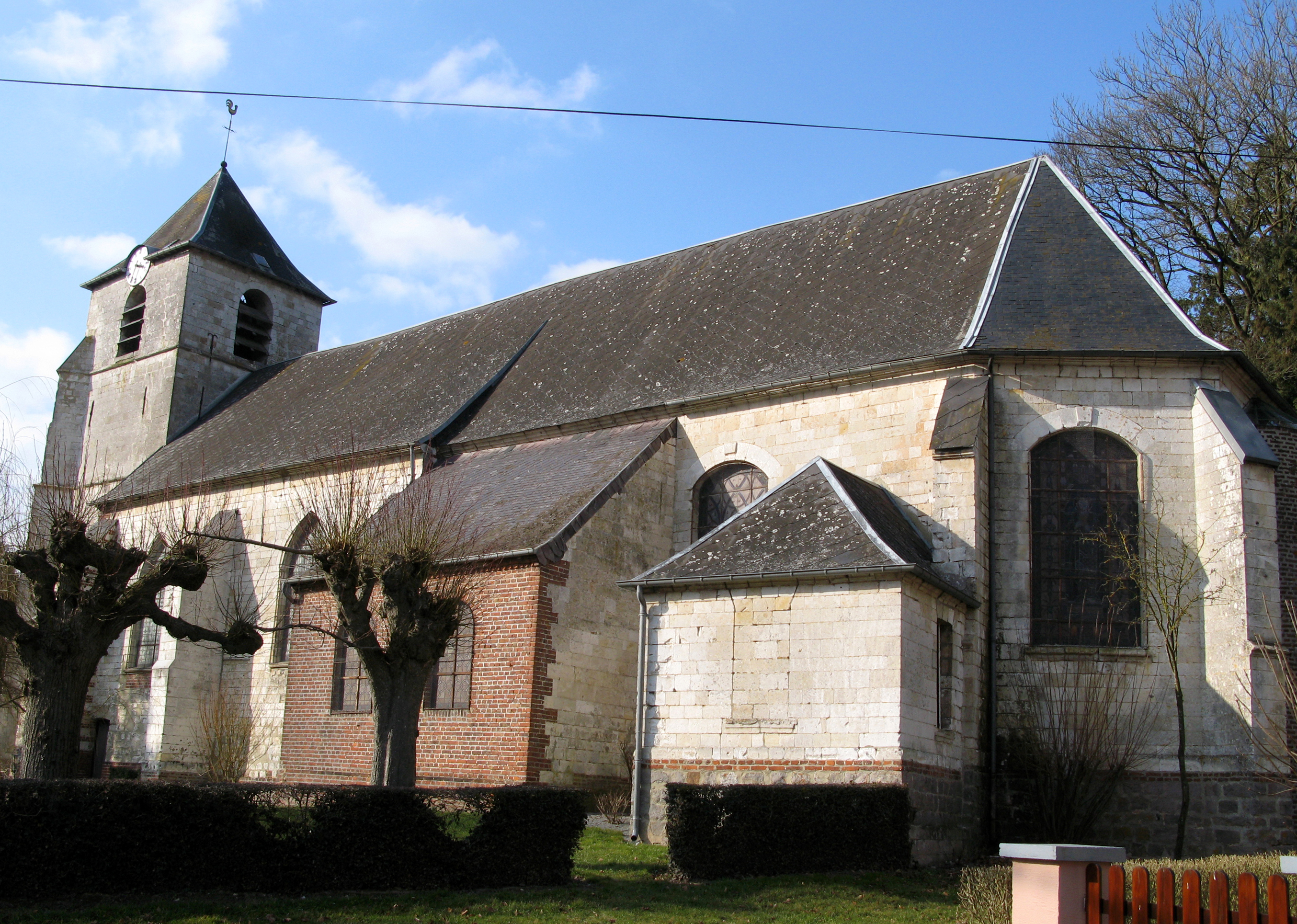
- The church in Bus-lès-Artois

- Coat of arms
- Location of Bus-lès-Artois
- Location within France Location within Hauts-de-France
- Coordinates: 50°06′15″N 2°32′32″E
- Country: France
- Region: Hauts-de-France
- Department: Somme
- Arrondissement: Péronne
- Canton: Albert
- Intercommunality: Pays du Coquelicot

Government
  - Mayor (2020–2026): Bernadette Pombourg
- Area^{1}: 6.74 km^{2} (2.60 sq mi)
- Elevation: 140 m (460 ft)
- Highest elevation: 153 m (502 ft)
- Lowest elevation: 108 m (354 ft)
- Population (2023): 140
  - Density: 21/km^{2} (54/sq mi)
- Time zone: UTC+01:00 (CET)
  - Summer (DST): UTC+02:00 (CEST)
- INSEE/Postal code: 80153 /80560
- ^{1} French Land Register data, which excludes lakes, ponds, glaciers > 1 km^{2} (0.386 sq mi or 247 acres) and river estuaries.

Bus-lès-Artois (Picard: Beu-lès-Artoé) is a commune in the Somme department in Hauts-de-France in northern France.

== Geography ==
The commune is situated on the D176 road, some 48 kilometres (30 mi) northeast of Amiens.

== Population ==
Historical population
Year	Pop.	±% p.a.
1968	193	—
1975	158	−2.82%
1982	135	−2.22%
1990	135	+0.00%
1999	146	+0.87%
2007	144	−0.17%
2012	142	−0.28%
2017	134	−1.15%
2023	140	+0.73%
Source: INSEE

== Places of interest ==
- Church of Saint Pierre, constructed over several centuries, restored in 1804.
- Château de 1848, built on the site of an old fort, to the north of the church.
- The playing area of the Picard sport ‘fr:ballon au poing’

== See also ==
- Communes of the Somme department
