= Marieux =

- Commune
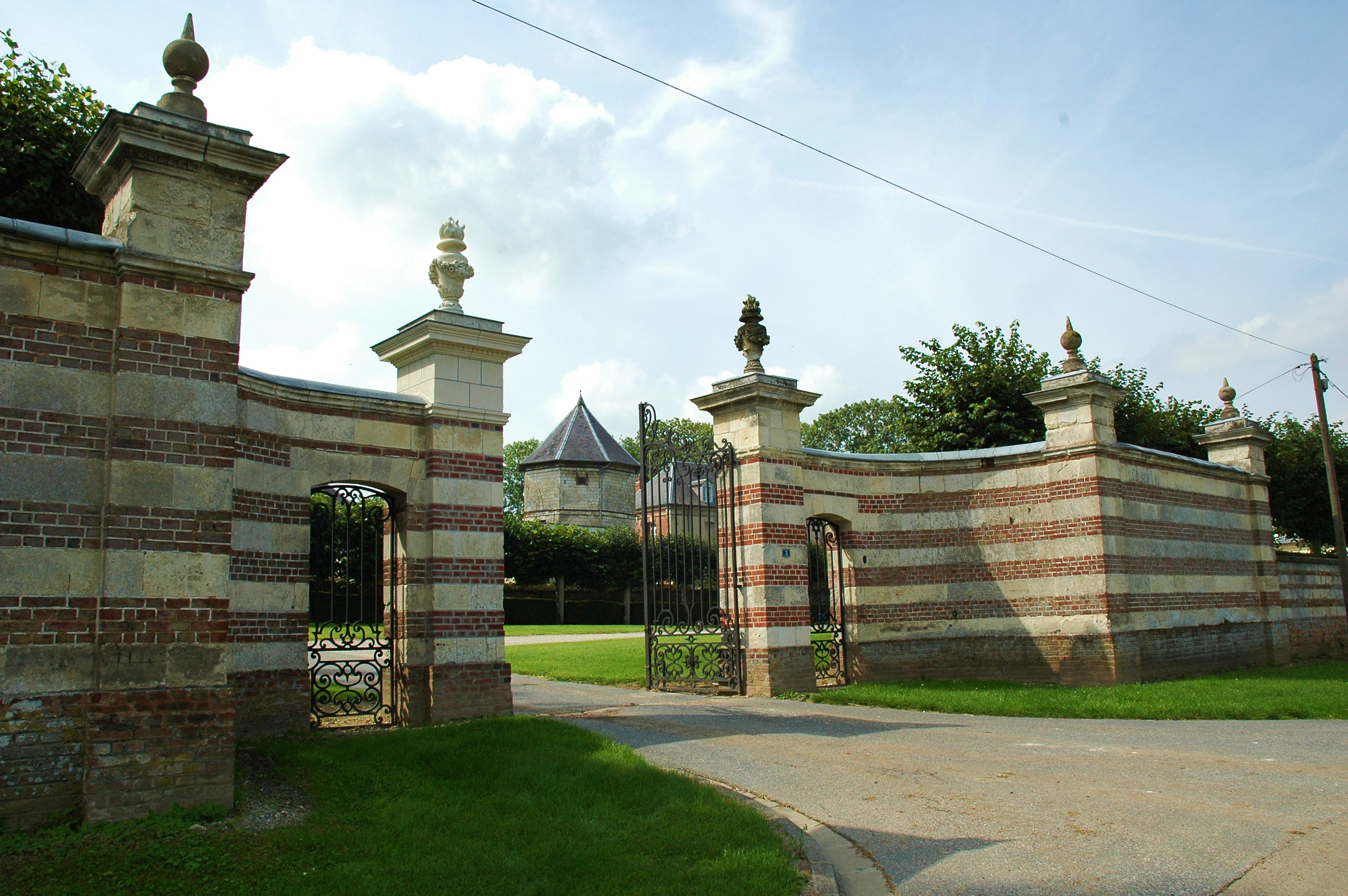
- The entrance to the chateau in Marieux
- Location of Marieux
- Location within France Location within Hauts-de-France
- Coordinates: 50°06′23″N 2°26′37″E
- Country: France
- Region: Hauts-de-France
- Department: Somme
- Arrondissement: Péronne
- Canton: Albert
- Intercommunality: Pays du Coquelicot

Government
  - Mayor (2020–2026): Hervé Bayard
- Area^{1}: 4.07 km^{2} (1.57 sq mi)
- Elevation: 102 m (335 ft)
- Highest elevation: 133 m (436 ft)
- Lowest elevation: 75 m (246 ft)
- Population (2023): 128
  - Density: 31.4/km^{2} (81.5/sq mi)
- Time zone: UTC+01:00 (CET)
  - Summer (DST): UTC+02:00 (CEST)
- INSEE/Postal code: 80514 /80560
- ^{1} French Land Register data, which excludes lakes, ponds, glaciers > 1 km^{2} (0.386 sq mi or 247 acres) and river estuaries.

Marieux (French pronunciation: [maʁjø]) is a commune in the Somme department in Hauts-de-France in northern France.

== Geography ==
Marieux is situated on the D11 road, some 20 miles (32 km) north of Amiens.

== History ==
The château was built in 1777 and is still owned and occupied by the same family today. Marieux is on the once strategically important and well-protected Roman road leading from Amiens to the English Channel and Britain.

During the First World War, it was British army headquarters for this part of the western front. On 25 October 1915, George V lunched here at the château with French Président Poincaré and the Chiefs-of-Staff of the French and British armies.

== Population ==
Historical population
Year	Pop.	±% p.a.
1968	115	—
1975	117	+0.25%
1982	113	−0.50%
1990	92	−2.54%
1999	82	−1.27%
2007	107	+3.38%
2012	111	+0.74%
2017	122	+1.91%
2023	128	+0.80%
Source: INSEE

== See also ==
- Communes of the Somme department
