= Courcelles-au-Bois =

- Commune
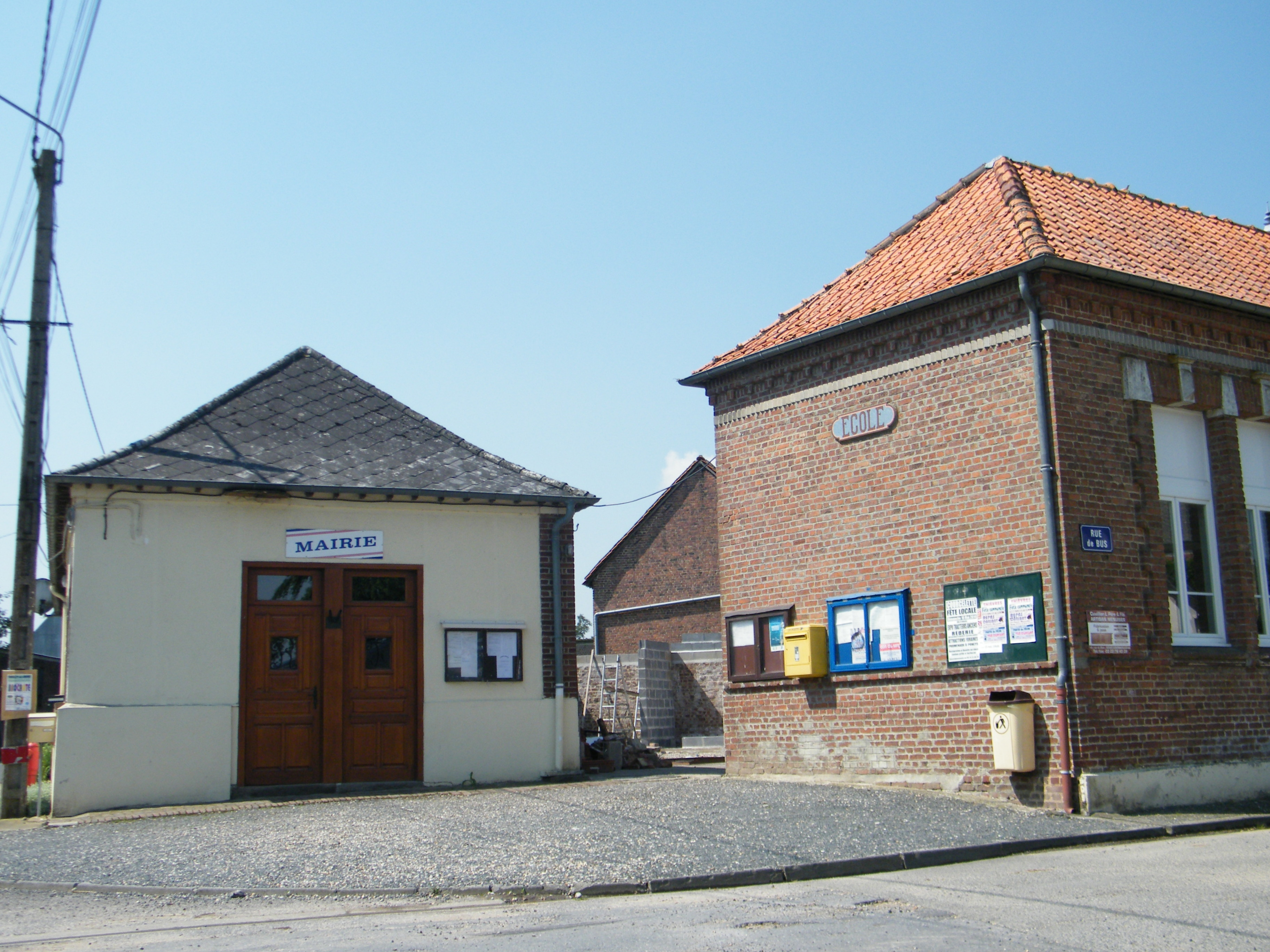
- The town hall in Courcelles-au-Bois
- Location of Courcelles-au-Bois
- Location within France Location within Hauts-de-France
- Coordinates: 50°06′17″N 2°35′04″E
- Country: France
- Region: Hauts-de-France
- Department: Somme
- Arrondissement: Péronne
- Canton: Albert
- Intercommunality: Pays du Coquelicot

Government
  - Mayor (2020–2026): Emilie Begyn
- Area^{1}: 2.02 km^{2} (0.78 sq mi)
- Elevation: 144 m (472 ft)
- Highest elevation: 156 m (512 ft)
- Lowest elevation: 120 m (390 ft)
- Population (2023): 69
  - Density: 34/km^{2} (88/sq mi)
- Time zone: UTC+01:00 (CET)
  - Summer (DST): UTC+02:00 (CEST)
- INSEE/Postal code: 80217 /80560
- ^{1} French Land Register data, which excludes lakes, ponds, glaciers > 1 km^{2} (0.386 sq mi or 247 acres) and river estuaries.

Courcelles-au-Bois (French pronunciation: [kuʁsɛl o bwa]; Picard: Courchelle-au-Bos) is a commune in the northern French department of Somme.

== Geography ==
The commune is situated on the D114 road, some 20 miles (32 km) northeast of Amiens.

== Population ==
Historical population
Year	Pop.	±% p.a.
1968	79	—
1975	72	−1.32%
1982	60	−2.57%
1990	52	−1.77%
1999	74	+4.00%
2007	72	−0.34%
2012	87	+3.86%
2017	82	−1.18%
2023	69	−2.84%
Source: INSEE

== See also ==
- Communes of the Somme department
