= Léalvillers =

- Commune
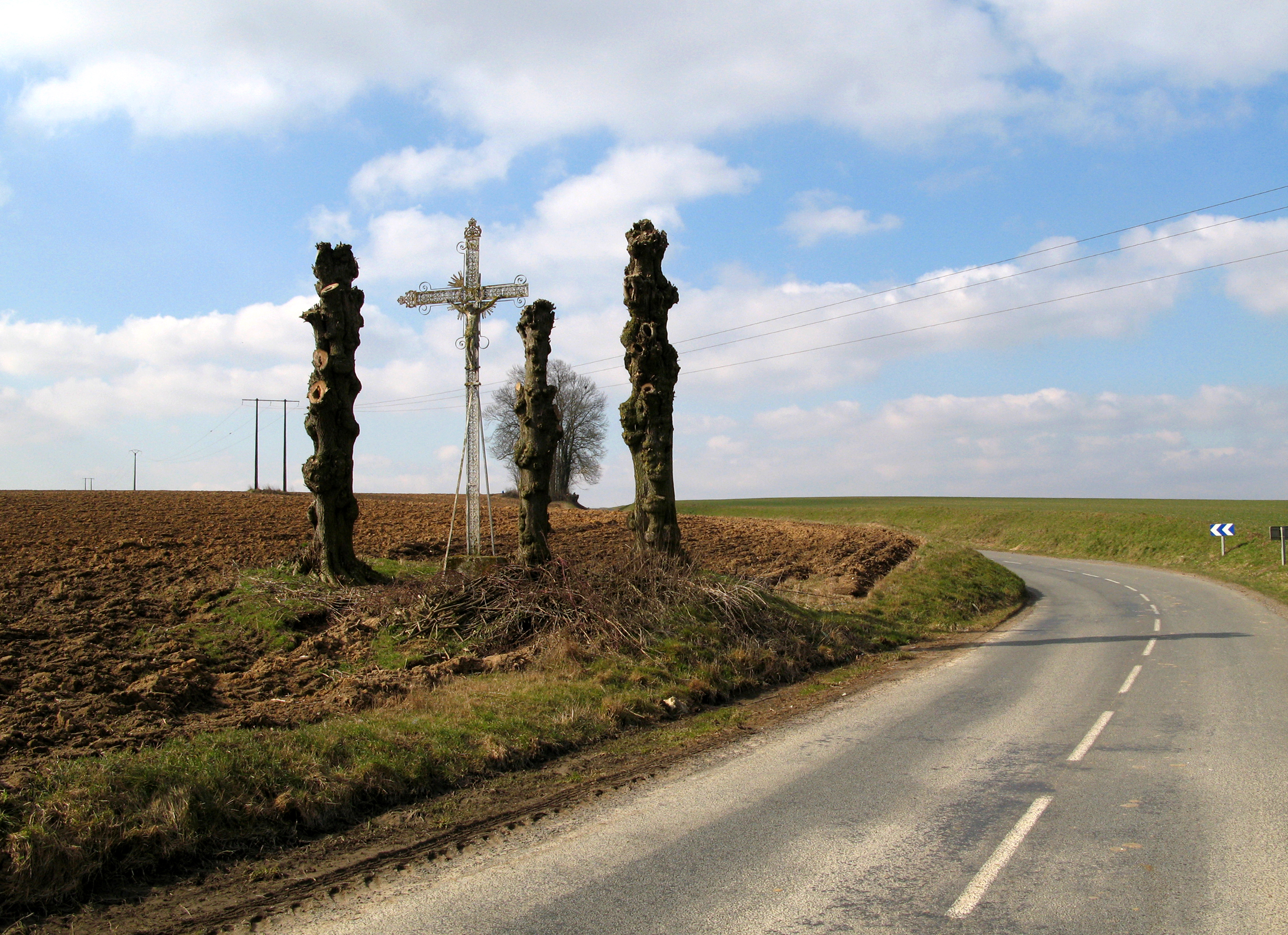
- The cross in Léalvillers

- Coat of arms
- Location of Léalvillers
- Location within France Location within Hauts-de-France
- Coordinates: 50°03′54″N 2°30′40″E
- Country: France
- Region: Hauts-de-France
- Department: Somme
- Arrondissement: Péronne
- Canton: Albert
- Intercommunality: CC Pays du Coquelicot

Government
  - Mayor (2020–2026): Véronique Cozette
- Area^{1}: 2.23 km^{2} (0.86 sq mi)
- Elevation: 142 m (466 ft)
- Highest elevation: 157 m (515 ft)
- Lowest elevation: 116 m (381 ft)
- Population (2023): 156
  - Density: 70.0/km^{2} (181/sq mi)
- Time zone: UTC+01:00 (CET)
  - Summer (DST): UTC+02:00 (CEST)
- INSEE/Postal code: 80470 /80560
- ^{1} French Land Register data, which excludes lakes, ponds, glaciers > 1 km^{2} (0.386 sq mi or 247 acres) and river estuaries.

Léalvillers is a commune in the Somme département in the Hauts-de-France region of France.

== Geography ==
Situated at the junction of the D114 and D31 roads, some 20 miles (32 km) northeast of Amiens.

== Population ==
Historical population
Year	Pop.	±% p.a.
1968	161	—
1975	158	−0.27%
1982	182	+2.04%
1990	183	+0.07%
1999	166	−1.08%
2007	180	+1.02%
2012	174	−0.68%
2017	167	−0.82%
2023	156	−1.13%
Source: INSEE

== See also ==
- Communes of the Somme department
