= Toutencourt =

- Commune
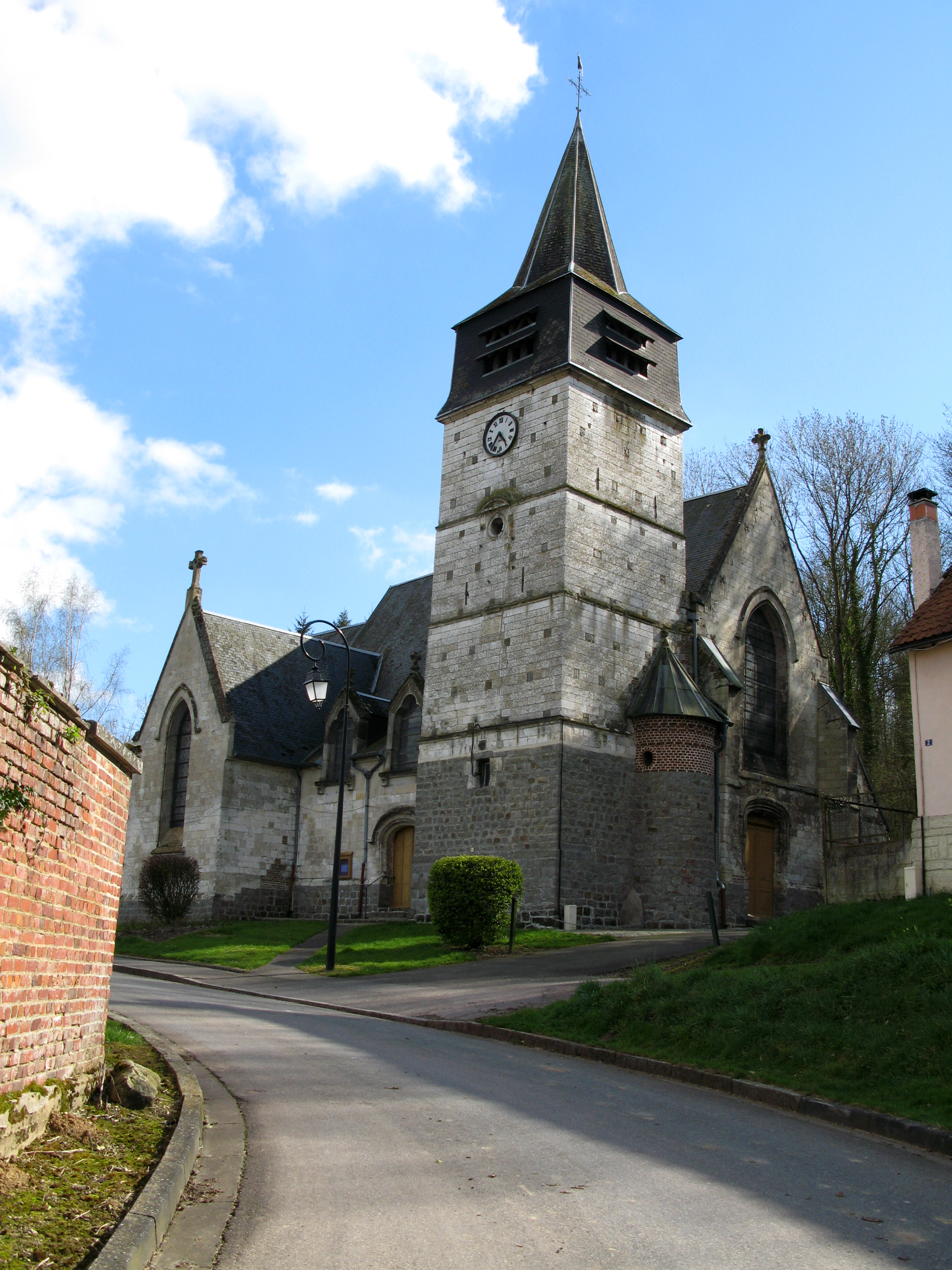
- The church in Toutencourt
- Location of Toutencourt
- Location within France Location within Hauts-de-France
- Coordinates: 50°02′10″N 2°27′43″E
- Country: France
- Region: Hauts-de-France
- Department: Somme
- Arrondissement: Péronne
- Canton: Albert
- Intercommunality: Pays du Coquelicot

Government
  - Mayor (2020–2026): Jean-Pierre Carpi
- Area^{1}: 14.37 km^{2} (5.55 sq mi)
- Elevation: 100 m (330 ft)
- Highest elevation: 153 m (502 ft)
- Lowest elevation: 63 m (207 ft)
- Population (2023): 435
  - Density: 30.3/km^{2} (78.4/sq mi)
- Time zone: UTC+01:00 (CET)
  - Summer (DST): UTC+02:00 (CEST)
- INSEE/Postal code: 80766 /80560
- ^{1} French Land Register data, which excludes lakes, ponds, glaciers > 1 km^{2} (0.386 sq mi or 247 acres) and river estuaries.

Toutencourt (French pronunciation: [tutɑ̃kuʁ]; Picard: Toutincourt) is a commune in the Somme department in Hauts-de-France in northern France.

== Geography ==
Toutencourt is situated 14 miles (23 km) northeast of Amiens, on the D23 and D114 crossroads.

== Population ==
Historical population
Year	Pop.	±% p.a.
1968	436	—
1975	426	−0.33%
1982	467	+1.32%
1990	484	+0.45%
1999	493	+0.20%
2007	494	+0.03%
2012	507	+0.52%
2017	461	−1.88%
2023	435	−0.96%
Source: INSEE

== See also ==
- Communes of the Somme department
