= Senlis-le-Sec =

- Commune
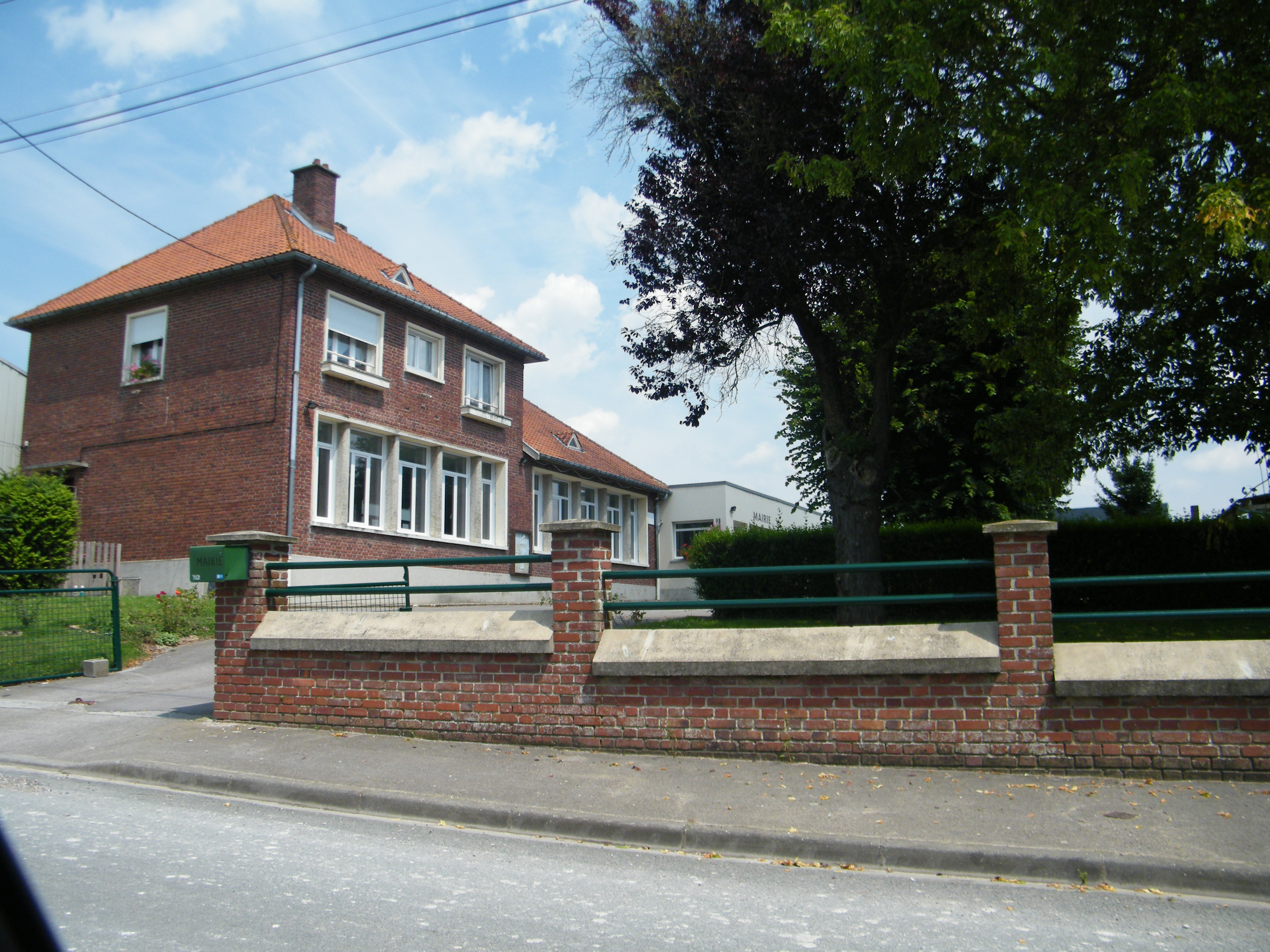
- The school in Senlis-le-Sec
- Location of Senlis-le-Sec
- Location within France Location within Hauts-de-France
- Coordinates: 50°01′33″N 2°35′21″E
- Country: France
- Region: Hauts-de-France
- Department: Somme
- Arrondissement: Péronne
- Canton: Albert
- Intercommunality: Pays du Coquelicot

Government
  - Mayor (2020–2026): Geneviève Lebailly
- Area^{1}: 8.28 km^{2} (3.20 sq mi)
- Elevation: 92 m (302 ft)
- Highest elevation: 137 m (449 ft)
- Lowest elevation: 72 m (236 ft)
- Population (2023): 324
  - Density: 39.1/km^{2} (101/sq mi)
- Time zone: UTC+01:00 (CET)
  - Summer (DST): UTC+02:00 (CEST)
- INSEE/Postal code: 80733 /80300
- ^{1} French Land Register data, which excludes lakes, ponds, glaciers > 1 km^{2} (0.386 sq mi or 247 acres) and river estuaries.

Senlis-le-Sec is a commune in the Somme department in Hauts-de-France in northern France.

== Geography ==
The commune is situated 15 miles (24 km) northeast of Amiens, on the D119 road

== Population ==
Historical population
Year	Pop.	±% p.a.
1968	263	—
1975	258	−0.27%
1982	265	+0.38%
1990	272	+0.33%
1999	302	+1.17%
2007	285	−0.72%
2012	285	+0.00%
2017	294	+0.62%
2023	324	+1.63%
Source: INSEE

== See also ==
- Communes of the Somme department
