= Arquèves =

- Commune
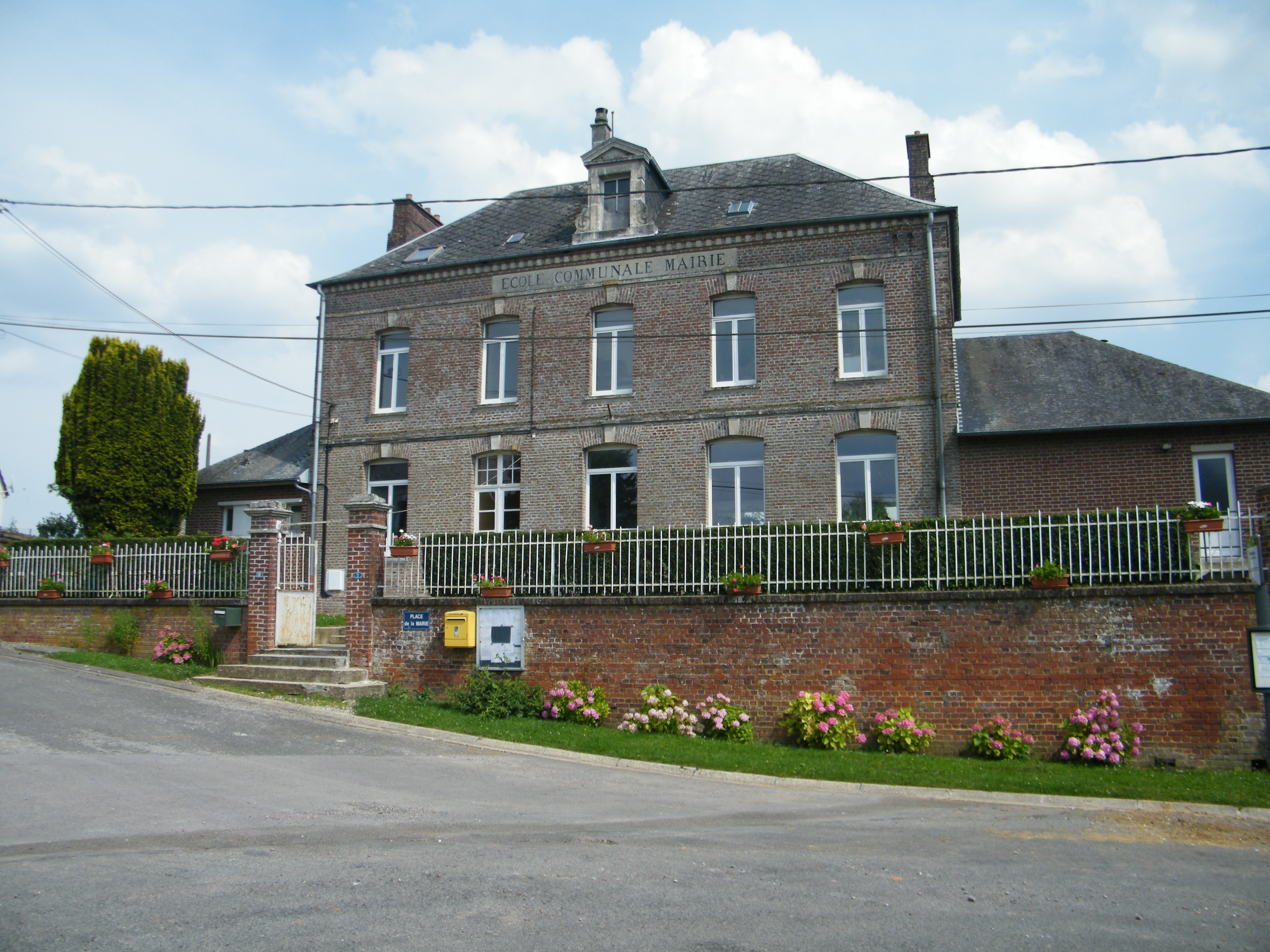
- The town hall and school of Arquèves
- Location of Arquèves
- Location within France Location within Hauts-de-France
- Coordinates: 50°04′21″N 2°28′10″E
- Country: France
- Region: Hauts-de-France
- Department: Somme
- Arrondissement: Péronne
- Canton: Albert
- Intercommunality: CC Pays Coquelicot

Government
  - Mayor (2020–2026): Christophe Deloraine
- Area^{1}: 7.64 km^{2} (2.95 sq mi)
- Elevation: 153 m (502 ft)
- Highest elevation: 152 m (499 ft)
- Lowest elevation: 100 m (330 ft)
- Population (2023): 152
  - Density: 19.9/km^{2} (51.5/sq mi)
- Time zone: UTC+01:00 (CET)
  - Summer (DST): UTC+02:00 (CEST)
- INSEE/Postal code: 80028 /80560
- ^{1} French Land Register data, which excludes lakes, ponds, glaciers > 1 km^{2} (0.386 sq mi or 247 acres) and river estuaries.

Arquèves (French pronunciation: [aʁkɛv]; Picard: Artchève) is a commune in the Somme department in Hauts-de-France in northern France.

== See also ==
- Communes of the Somme department
