= Hérissart =

- Commune
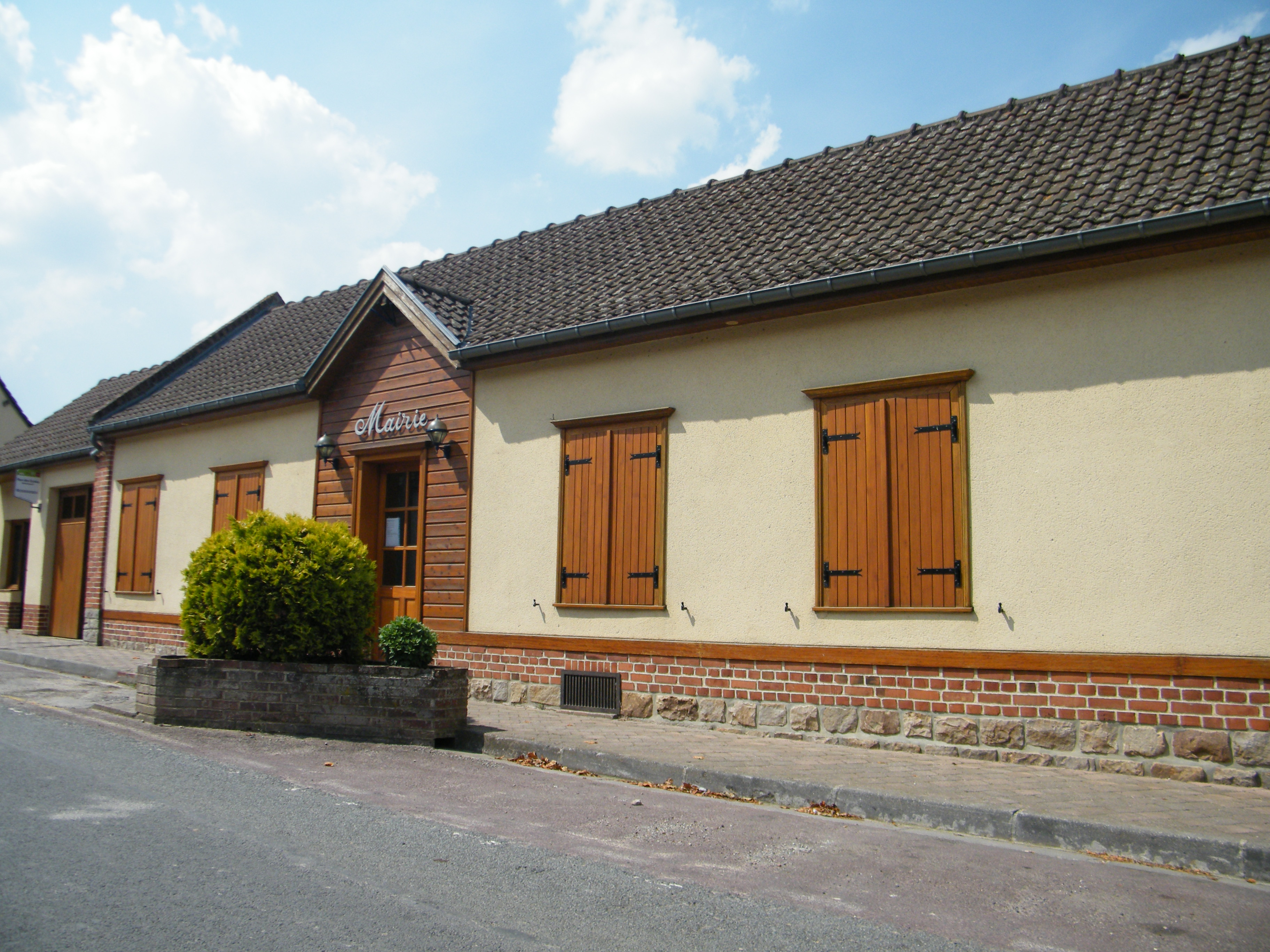
- The town hall in Hérissart
- Location of Hérissart
- Location within France Location within Hauts-de-France
- Coordinates: 50°01′14″N 2°25′02″E
- Country: France
- Region: Hauts-de-France
- Department: Somme
- Arrondissement: Péronne
- Canton: Albert
- Intercommunality: Pays du Coquelicot

Government
  - Mayor (2020–2026): Thibault Petit
- Area^{1}: 7.39 km^{2} (2.85 sq mi)
- Elevation: 185 m (607 ft)
- Highest elevation: 151 m (495 ft)
- Lowest elevation: 79 m (259 ft)
- Population (2023): 764
  - Density: 103/km^{2} (268/sq mi)
- Time zone: UTC+01:00 (CET)
  - Summer (DST): UTC+02:00 (CEST)
- INSEE/Postal code: 80431 /80260
- ^{1} French Land Register data, which excludes lakes, ponds, glaciers > 1 km^{2} (0.386 sq mi or 247 acres) and river estuaries.

Hérissart (French pronunciation: [eʁisaʁ]) is a commune in the Somme department in Hauts-de-France in northern France.

== Geography ==
The commune is situated at the junction of the D60 and D114 road, some 14 miles (23 km) northeast of Amiens.

== History ==
Known variously as Henresart, Henrissart or Herrissart, the name Hérissart suggests deforested wasteland, especially covered in brambles or gorse.
First mentioned in a charter of donations by Clotaire to the abbey of Corbie in 662, as a village created by clearing (:fr: "essarter" ) some of the forest of Vicogne. Sandstone, (:fr:grès) was once quarried here and used in Amiens cathedral. Today, nothing remains of the industry.
In 1774, Guy Antoine Picquet, the last ‘seigneur’ of Hérissart, donated a new bell for the church. Cast in the famous Cavillers foundry at nearby Carrépuis, this bell is still used today, two others having been seized during the French Revolution.

Many of the inhabitants were involved, to some degree, in the production of linen, from the growing of flax through preparation and weaving. In 1842, a great fire destroyed many cottages and farms, reducing much of the output, which never fully recovered.

The new cemetery was created in 1866, when the church graveyard was full. The schools and the mairie were built in 1869.

During the Franco-Prussian War, the village was taken by the Germans of the 8th Prussian Rhenane Corps, about 300 mane and horses, on 21 March 1871. They stayed till 26 April 1871.
The village lost almost a third of its young men during World War I. Many British troops were billeted here during the fighting.

== Population ==
Historical population
Year	Pop.	±% p.a.
1968	412	—
1975	463	+1.68%
1982	512	+1.45%
1990	510	−0.05%
1999	494	−0.35%
2007	529	+0.86%
2012	603	+2.65%
2017	614	+0.36%
2023	764	+3.71%
Source: INSEE

== See also ==
- Communes of the Somme department
