= Puchevillers =

- Commune
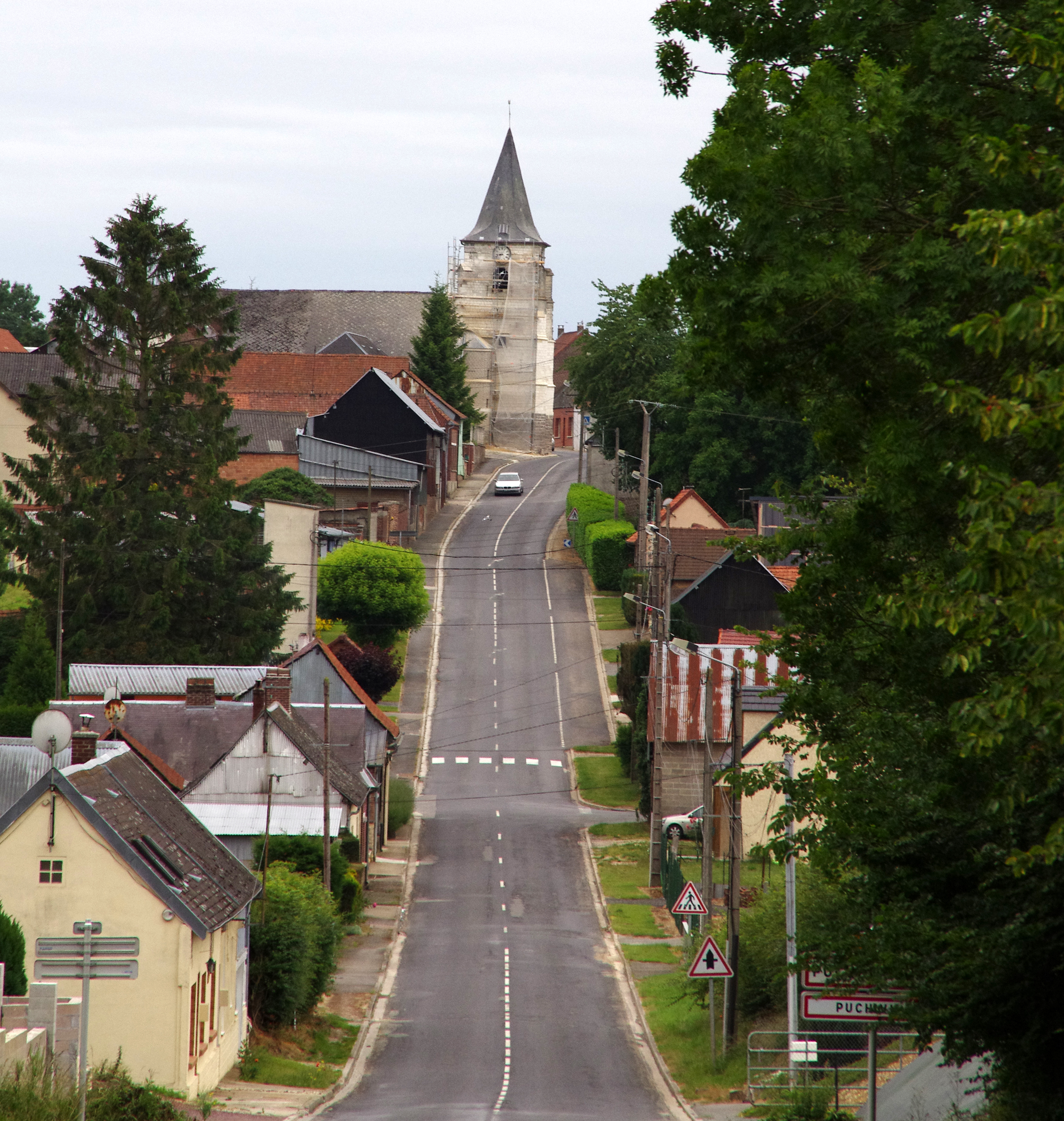
- The main road in Puchevillers
- Location of Puchevillers
- Location within France Location within Hauts-de-France
- Coordinates: 50°03′21″N 2°24′40″E
- Country: France
- Region: Hauts-de-France
- Department: Somme
- Arrondissement: Péronne
- Canton: Albert
- Intercommunality: Pays du Coquelicot

Government
  - Mayor (2020–2026): Pascal Dekydtspotter
- Area^{1}: 14.24 km^{2} (5.50 sq mi)
- Elevation: 135 m (443 ft)
- Highest elevation: 151 m (495 ft)
- Lowest elevation: 77 m (253 ft)
- Population (2023): 572
  - Density: 40.2/km^{2} (104/sq mi)
- Time zone: UTC+01:00 (CET)
  - Summer (DST): UTC+02:00 (CEST)
- INSEE/Postal code: 80645 /80560
- ^{1} French Land Register data, which excludes lakes, ponds, glaciers > 1 km^{2} (0.386 sq mi or 247 acres) and river estuaries.

Puchevillers is a commune in the Somme department in Hauts-de-France in northern France.

== Geography ==
Puchevillers is situated on the D11 and D23 crossroads, some 13 miles (21 km) north of Amiens.

== Population ==
Historical population
Year	Pop.	±% p.a.
1968	438	—
1975	395	−1.47%
1982	424	+1.02%
1990	483	+1.64%
1999	487	+0.09%
2007	502	+0.38%
2012	532	+1.17%
2017	555	+0.85%
2023	572	+0.50%
Source: INSEE

== See also ==
- Communes of the Somme department
