= Harponville =

- Commune
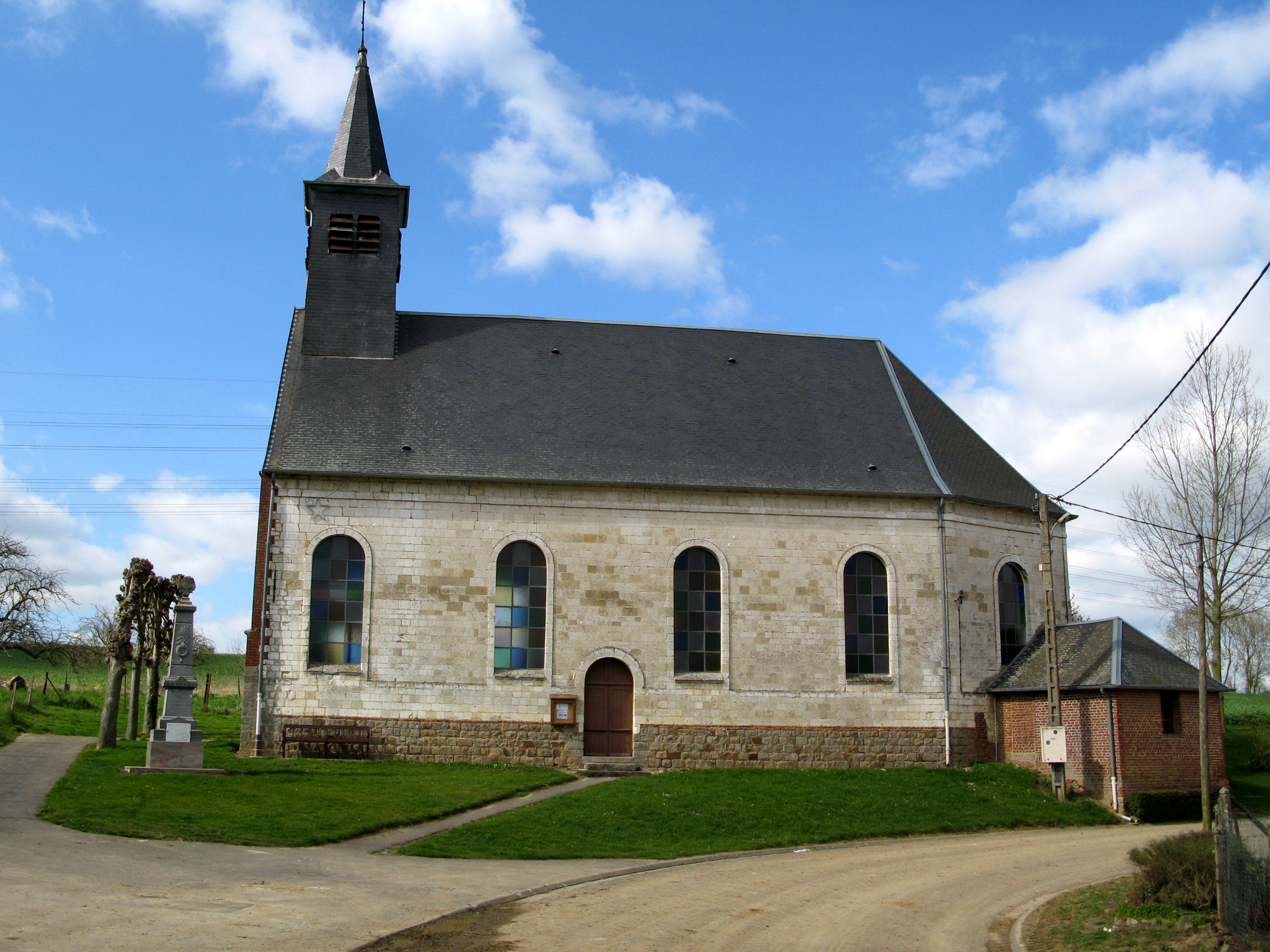
- The church in Harponville

- Coat of arms
- Location of Harponville
- Location within France Location within Hauts-de-France
- Coordinates: 50°02′10″N 2°30′11″E
- Country: France
- Region: Hauts-de-France
- Department: Somme
- Arrondissement: Péronne
- Canton: Albert
- Intercommunality: Pays du Coquelicot

Government
  - Mayor (2020–2026): Christophe Lemaitre
- Area^{1}: 2.75 km^{2} (1.06 sq mi)
- Elevation: 135 m (443 ft)
- Highest elevation: 147 m (482 ft)
- Lowest elevation: 69 m (226 ft)
- Population (2023): 170
  - Density: 62/km^{2} (160/sq mi)
- Time zone: UTC+01:00 (CET)
  - Summer (DST): UTC+02:00 (CEST)
- INSEE/Postal code: 80420 /80560
- ^{1} French Land Register data, which excludes lakes, ponds, glaciers > 1 km^{2} (0.386 sq mi or 247 acres) and river estuaries.

Harponville is a commune in the Somme department in Hauts-de-France in northern France.

== Geography ==
Harponville is situated on the D47 road, some 20 miles (32 km) northeast of Amiens.

== History ==
The village of Harponville is first noted as belonging to the abbey at Saint-Riquier. Later it becomes a strongly Protestant place, owing to the Raincheval family's influence. Burials took place in the gardens of their home.
At the beginning of the 19th century, the cordiality between the two denominations was such that they decided to build a wall in the old parish church, Catholic on one side, Protestant on the other. This wall was later demolished and a church for the Protestants was built in 1823 and rebuilt in 1863 after a fire.
The village was unaffected by World War I. A defensive system of trenches and a blockhouse were set up in the ‘’Bois de l’Abbaye’’ near ‘’Mont d’Harponville’’ which kept the village safe.

== Population ==
Historical population
Year	Pop.	±% p.a.
1968	160	—
1975	151	−0.82%
1982	150	−0.09%
1990	130	−1.77%
1999	125	−0.43%
2007	151	+2.39%
2012	178	+3.34%
2017	180	+0.22%
2023	170	−0.95%
Source: INSEE

== Places of interest ==
- The 19th-century church. The stone came from the former château of Harponville and the old abbey at Clairfaye
- 19th-century Protestant church. (Permanent exposition inside)
- 19th-century school

== See also ==
Tiodave Sambé Destrotilles : - Professeur de Picard à l'université d'Amiens - Chef d'entreprise en langue et culture picarde à Harponville http://grebenote.com - Chroniqueur d'actualités sur le web en langue picarde http://nomdezeu.over-blog.fr

Sam Corwynn - Luthier, musicien et sorcier à Harponville https://web.archive.org/web/20130620183717/http://cor-wynn.com/ - Jardinier en permaculture à Harponville https://web.archive.org/web/20130821010221/http://cor-wynn.com/atelier/pimpmingardin/
