= Canton of Albert =

Coordinates: 50°0′10″N 2°39′10″E

Albert
- Canton
- Interactive map of Albert
- Country: France
- Region: Hauts-de-France
- Department: Somme
- No. of communes: {{{nbcomm}}}
- Area: 464.00 km^{2} (179.15 sq mi)
- Population (2023): 27,713
  - Density: 59.726/km^{2} (154.69/sq mi)
- INSEE code: 80 05

The Canton of Albert is a canton situated in the department of the Somme and in the Hauts-de-France region of northern France.

== Geography ==
The canton is organised around the commune of Albert.

== Composition ==
At the French canton reorganisation which came into effect in March 2015, the canton was expanded from 26 to 67 communes (4 of which were merged into the new communes Étinehem-Méricourt and Carnoy-Mametz):

- Acheux-en-Amiénois
- Albert
- Arquèves
- Auchonvillers
- Authie
- Authuille
- Aveluy
- Bayencourt
- Bazentin
- Beaucourt-sur-l'Ancre
- Beaumont-Hamel
- Bécordel-Bécourt
- Bertrancourt
- Bouzincourt
- Bray-sur-Somme
- Buire-sur-l'Ancre
- Bus-lès-Artois
- Cappy
- Carnoy-Mametz
- Chuignolles
- Coigneux
- Colincamps
- Contalmaison
- Courcelette
- Courcelles-au-Bois
- Curlu
- Dernancourt
- Éclusier-Vaux
- Englebelmer
- Étinehem-Méricourt
- Forceville
- Fricourt
- Frise
- Grandcourt
- Harponville
- Hédauville
- Hérissart
- Irles
- Laviéville
- Léalvillers
- Louvencourt
- Mailly-Maillet
- Maricourt
- Marieux
- Méaulte
- Mesnil-Martinsart
- Millencourt
- Miraumont
- Montauban-de-Picardie
- Morlancourt
- La Neuville-lès-Bray
- Ovillers-la-Boisselle
- Pozières
- Puchevillers
- Pys
- Raincheval
- Saint-Léger-lès-Authie
- Senlis-le-Sec
- Suzanne
- Thiepval
- Thièvres
- Toutencourt
- Varennes
- Vauchelles-lès-Authie
- Ville-sur-Ancre

== Population ==
Historical population
Year	Pop.	±% p.a.
2013	28,390	—
2018	28,302	−0.06%
Source: INSEE

== See also ==
- Arrondissements of the Somme department
- Cantons of the Somme department
- Communes of the Somme department
