= Raincheval =

- Commune
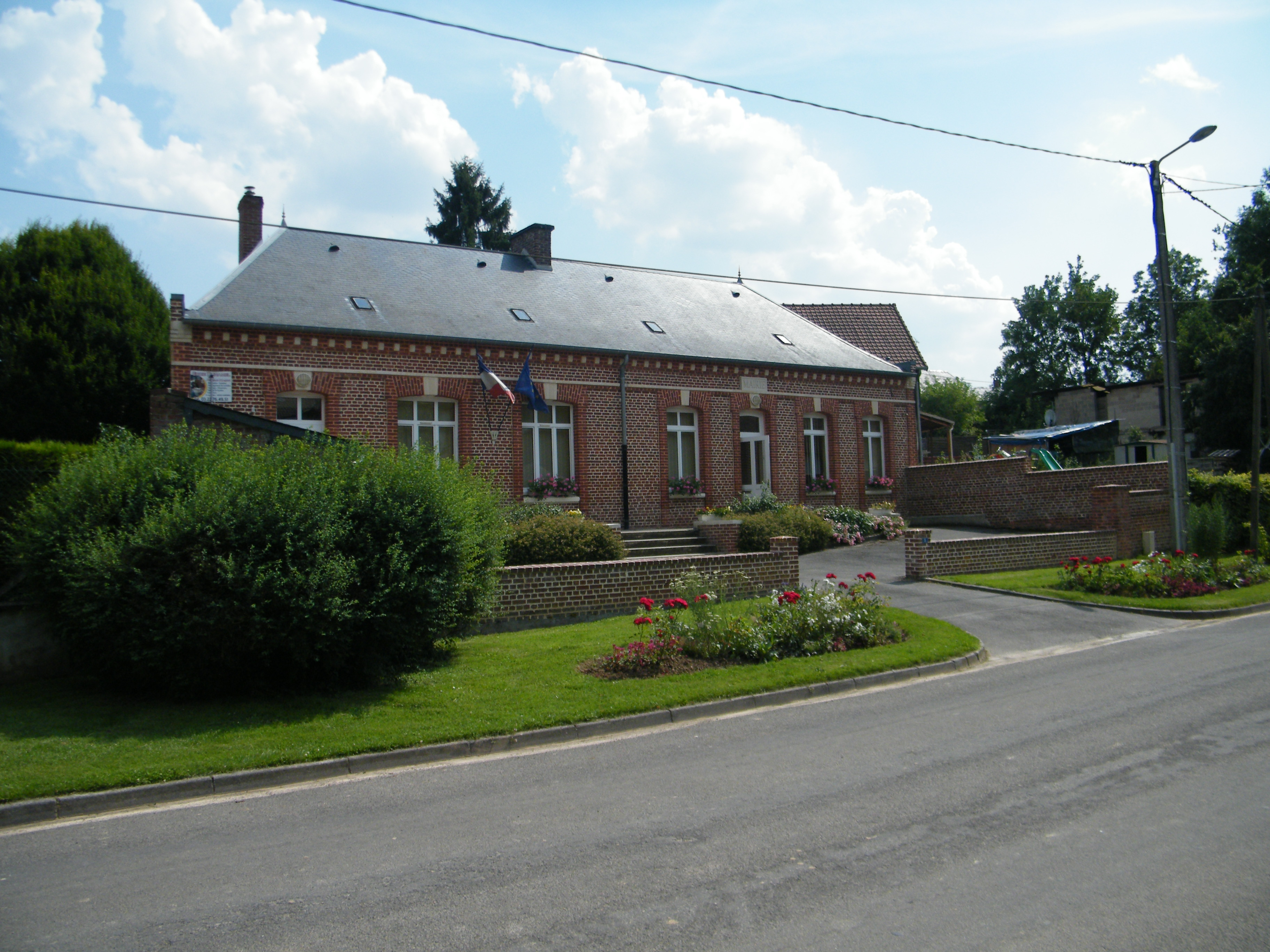
- The town hall in Raincheval
- Location of Raincheval
- Location within France Location within Hauts-de-France
- Coordinates: 50°04′27″N 2°26′21″E
- Country: France
- Region: Hauts-de-France
- Department: Somme
- Arrondissement: Péronne
- Canton: Albert
- Intercommunality: Pays du Coquelicot

Government
  - Mayor (2020–2026): Jean-Pierre Billoré
- Area^{1}: 6.8 km^{2} (2.6 sq mi)
- Elevation: 137 m (449 ft)
- Highest elevation: 151 m (495 ft)
- Lowest elevation: 89 m (292 ft)
- Population (2023): 269
  - Density: 40/km^{2} (100/sq mi)
- Time zone: UTC+01:00 (CET)
  - Summer (DST): UTC+02:00 (CEST)
- INSEE/Postal code: 80659 /80600
- ^{1} French Land Register data, which excludes lakes, ponds, glaciers > 1 km^{2} (0.386 sq mi or 247 acres) and river estuaries.

Raincheval (French pronunciation: [ʁɛ̃ʃval]; Picard: Rainchveu) is a commune in the Somme department in Hauts-de-France in northern France.

== Geography ==
Raincheval is situated on the D31 road, some 16 miles (26 km) northeast of Amiens.

== Population ==
Historical population
Year	Pop.	±% p.a.
1968	259	—
1975	260	+0.06%
1982	226	−1.98%
1990	233	+0.38%
1999	244	+0.51%
2007	266	+1.08%
2012	288	+1.60%
2017	282	−0.42%
2023	269	−0.78%
Source: INSEE

== See also ==
- Communes of the Somme department
