= Bertrancourt =

- Commune
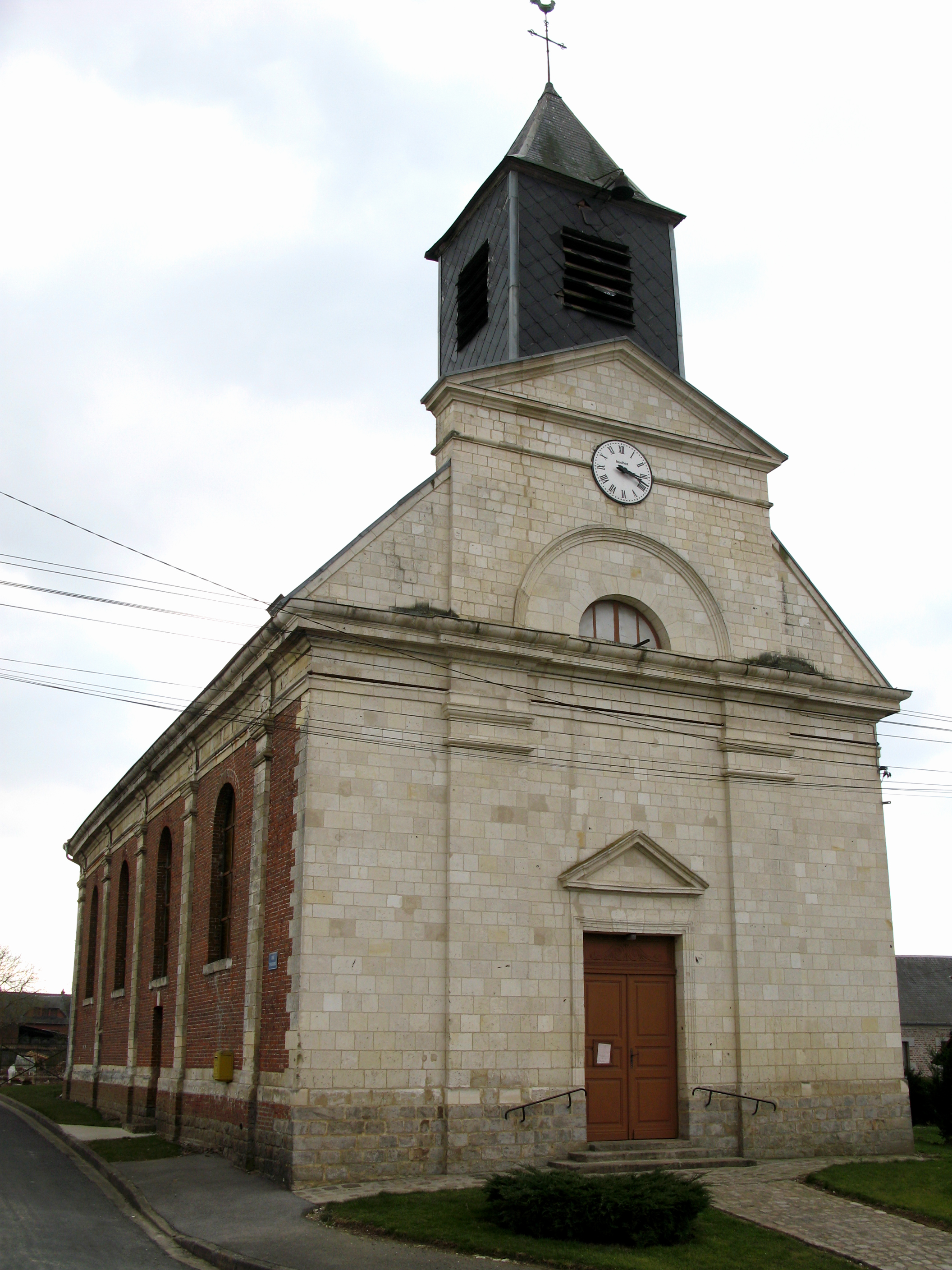
- The church in Bertrancourt

- Coat of arms
- Location of Bertrancourt
- Location within France Location within Hauts-de-France
- Coordinates: 50°05′41″N 2°33′23″E
- Country: France
- Region: Hauts-de-France
- Department: Somme
- Arrondissement: Péronne
- Canton: Albert
- Intercommunality: Pays du Coquelicot

Government
  - Mayor (2020–2026): Patrick Schricke
- Area^{1}: 6.09 km^{2} (2.35 sq mi)
- Elevation: 149 m (489 ft)
- Highest elevation: 157 m (515 ft)
- Lowest elevation: 125 m (410 ft)
- Population (2023): 220
  - Density: 36/km^{2} (94/sq mi)
- Time zone: UTC+01:00 (CET)
  - Summer (DST): UTC+02:00 (CEST)
- INSEE/Postal code: 80095 /80560
- ^{1} French Land Register data, which excludes lakes, ponds, glaciers > 1 km^{2} (0.386 sq mi or 247 acres) and river estuaries.

Bertrancourt (French pronunciation: [bɛʁtʁɑ̃kuʁ]; Picard: Bétrancourt) is a commune in the Somme department in Hauts-de-France in northern France. It is also the home of Belfast Linfield Football Club Somme Memorial, to commemorate ex-players and fans who paid the ultimate sacrifice during the Great War.

== Geography ==
Bertrancourt is situated on the D176 and D144 road junction, some 20 miles (32 km) northeast of Amiens.

== Population ==
Historical population
Year	Pop.	±% p.a.
1968	250	—
1975	231	−1.12%
1982	200	−2.04%
1990	200	+0.00%
1999	199	−0.06%
2007	224	+1.49%
2012	214	−0.91%
2017	223	+0.83%
2023	220	−0.23%
Source: INSEE

== See also ==
- Communes of the Somme department
