= Authie, Somme =

Authie
- Commune
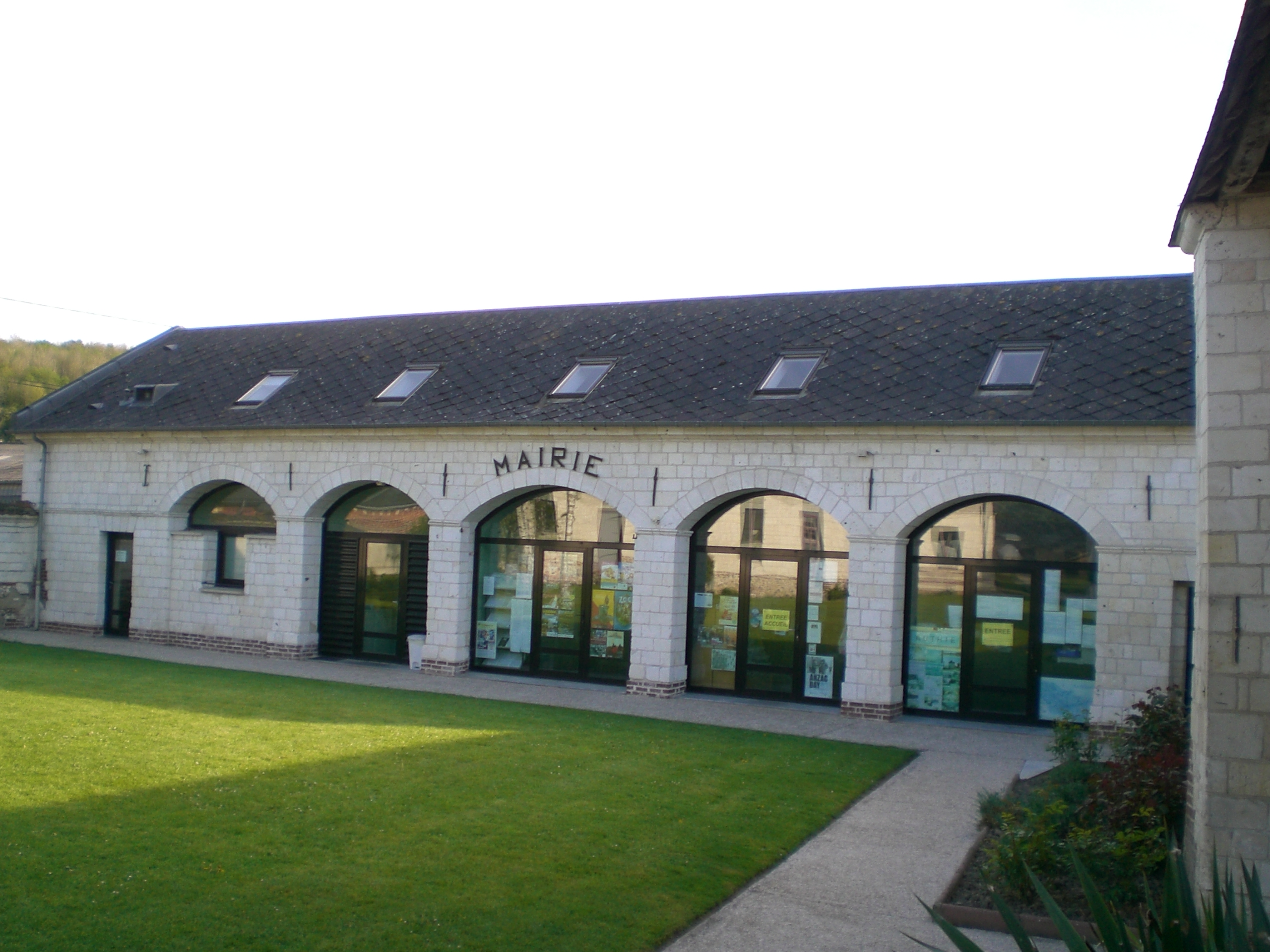
- The town hall of Authie, in the old priory
- Location of Authie
- Location within France Location within Hauts-de-France
- Coordinates: 50°07′13″N 2°29′21″E
- Country: France
- Region: Hauts-de-France
- Department: Somme
- Arrondissement: Péronne
- Canton: Albert
- Intercommunality: CC Pays Coquelicot

Government
  - Mayor (2020–2026): Honoré Froideval
- Area^{1}: 9.93 km^{2} (3.83 sq mi)
- Elevation: 90 m (300 ft)
- Highest elevation: 157 m (515 ft)
- Lowest elevation: 73 m (240 ft)
- Population (2023): 246
  - Density: 24.8/km^{2} (64.2/sq mi)
- Time zone: UTC+01:00 (CET)
  - Summer (DST): UTC+02:00 (CEST)
- INSEE/Postal code: 80043 /80560
- ^{1} French Land Register data, which excludes lakes, ponds, glaciers > 1 km^{2} (0.386 sq mi or 247 acres) and river estuaries.

Authie (French pronunciation: [oti]) is a commune in the Somme department in Hauts-de-France in northern France.

The commune was led by the elected mayor Henri Macron (the great-grandfather of Emmanuel Macron, current President of France), from 1953 to 1964. It was also the birthplace of the trouvère Simon d'Authie.

== See also ==
- Communes of the Somme department
