= Battle of Flers–Courcelette =

Battle during the First World War in France

- Part of the Battle of the Somme of the First World War
- Battle of the Somme 1 July – 18 November 1916
| Date | 15–22 September 1916 (1 week) |
| Location | Flers and Courcelette, France 50°3′32″N 2°44′52″E |
| Result | British victory |
| Territorial changes | Flers, Courcelette and vicinity captured |

Belligerents
| United Kingdom; Canada; India; New Zealand; France | German Empire |

Commanders and leaders
| (United Kingdom of Great Britain and Ireland) Douglas Haig; (French Third Republic) Ferdinand Foch; (French Third Republic) Émile Fayolle; (United Kingdom of Great Britain and Ireland) Henry Rawlinson; (United Kingdom of Great Britain and Ireland) Hubert Gough | (German Empire) (Kingdom of Bavaria) Crown Prince Rupprecht; (German Empire) Fritz von Below |

Strength
| Sixth Army; Fourth Army (11 divisions, 49 tanks); Reserve Army | 1st Army |

Casualties and losses
| 29,376 | (part of 130,000 casualties in September) |
- Flers and Courcelette, communes in the Pas-de-Calais department, Nord-Pas-de-Calais, France

The Battle of Flers–Courcelette ([flɛʁ kuʁsəlɛt], 15 to 22 September 1916) was fought during the Battle of the Somme in France, by the French Sixth Army and the British Fourth Army and Reserve Army, against the German 1st Army, during the First World War. The Anglo-French attack of 15 September began the third period of the Battle of the Somme but by its conclusion on 22 September, the strategic objective of a decisive victory had not been achieved. The infliction of many casualties on the German front divisions and the capture of the villages of Courcelette, Martinpuich and Flers had been a considerable tactical victory.

The German defensive success on the British right flank made exploitation and the use of cavalry impossible. Tanks were used in battle for the first time; the Canadian Corps and the New Zealand Division fought their first engagements on the Somme. On 16 September, Jagdstaffel 2, a specialist fighter squadron, began operations with five new Albatros D.I fighters, which had a performance capable of challenging British and French air supremacy for the first time in the battle.

The British attempt to advance deeply on the right and pivot on the left failed but the British gained about 2,500 yd (1.4 mi; 2.3 km) in general and captured High Wood, moving forward about 3,500 yd (2.0 mi; 3.2 km) in the centre, beyond Flers and Courcelette. The Fourth Army crossed Bazentin Ridge, which exposed the German rear-slope defences beyond to ground observation. On 18 September, the Quadrilateral, where the British advance had been frustrated on the right flank, was captured.

Arrangements were begun immediately to follow up the success which, after supply and weather delays, began on 25 September at the Battle of Morval, continued by the Reserve Army next day at the Battle of Thiepval Ridge. September was the most costly month of the battle for the German armies on the Somme, which suffered about 130,000 casualties. Combined with the losses at Verdun and on the Eastern Front, the German Empire was brought closer to military collapse than at any time before the autumn of 1918.

== Background ==
=== Strategic developments ===
==== Franco-British ====
At the beginning of August, optimistic that the Brusilov Offensive (4 June to 20 September) on the Eastern Front in Russia, would continue to absorb German and Austro-Hungarian reserves and that the Germans had abandoned the Battle of Verdun, General Sir Douglas Haig, commander of the British Expeditionary Force (BEF) in France, advocated to the War Committee in London, that pressure be kept on the German armies in France for as long as possible. Haig had hoped that the delay in producing tanks had been overcome and that enough would be ready in September.

Despite the small numbers of tanks available and the limited time for the training of their crews, Haig planned to use them in the mid-September battle being planned with the French, in view of the importance of the general Allied offensive being conducted on the Western Front in France, on the Italian front by Italy against the Austro-Hungarians and by General Aleksei Brusilov in Russia, which could not continue indefinitely. Haig believed that the German defence of the Somme front was weakening and that by mid-September might collapse altogether.

By September, Ferdinand Foch the commander of Groupe d'armées du Nord (GAN) and co-ordinator of the Somme offensive, had stopped trying to get the armies on the Somme (Tenth, Sixth, Fourth and Reserve) to attack simultaneously, which had proved impossible and instead make separate sequenced attacks, successively to envelop the German defences. Foch wanted to increase the size and tempo of attacks, to weaken the German defence and achieve rupture, a general German collapse. Haig had been reluctant to participate in August, when the Fourth Army was not close enough to the German third position to make a general attack practicable. The main effort was being made north of the Somme by the British and Foch had to acquiesce, while the Fourth Army closed up to the third position.

To help the Fourth Army, the Reserve Army was to resume attacks against Thiepval and begin attacks into the Ancre river valley; the Fourth Army was to capture the German intermediate and second positions from Guillemont to Martinpuich and then the third position from Morval to le Sars, as the Sixth Army attacked the intermediate line from Le Fôret to Cléry, then the third position from the Somme to Rancourt. On the south side of the river, the Tenth Army would commence its postponed attack from Barleux to Chilly.

==== German ====
On 28 August, General Erich von Falkenhayn, the Chief of the General Staff of Oberste Heeresleitung (OHL, supreme army command), simplified the German command structure on the Western Front by establishing two army groups. Heeresgruppe Kronprinz Rupprecht controlled the 6th Army, 1st Army, 2nd Army and 7th Army, from Lille to the boundary of Heeresgruppe Deutscher Kronprinz, from south of the Somme battlefield to beyond Verdun. Armeegruppe Gallwitz-Somme was dissolved and General Max von Gallwitz reverted to the command of the 2nd Army. The emergency in Russia caused by the Brusilov Offensive, the entry of Romania into the war and French counter-attacks at Verdun, put further strain on the German army. Falkenhayn was sacked from the OHL on 28 August and replaced by Hindenburg and Ludendorff. The Third OHL ordered an end to attacks at Verdun and despatched troop reinforcements to Romania and the Somme front.

=== Tactical developments ===
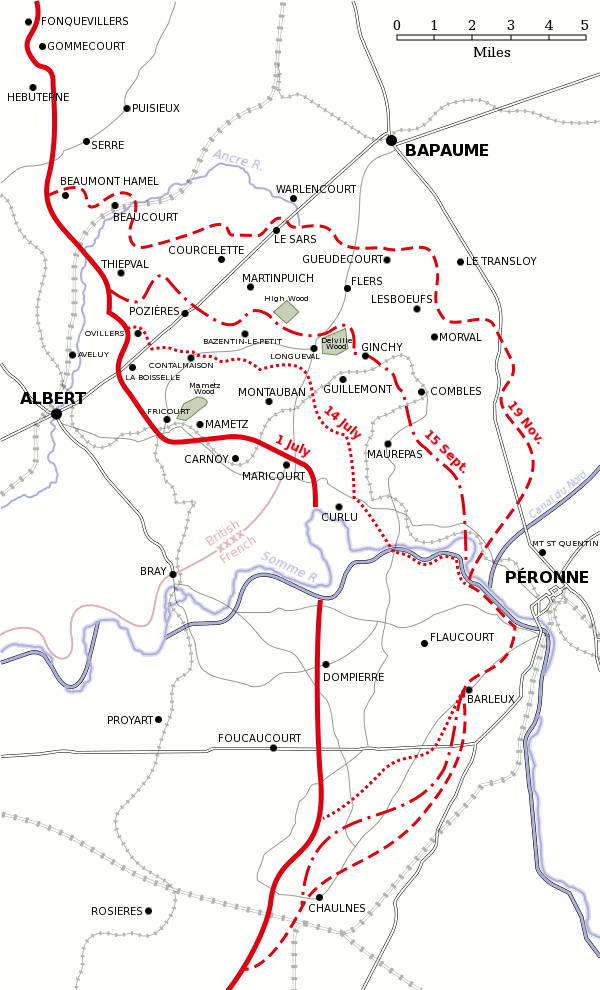
Progress of the Battle of the Somme between 1 July and 18 November.

Flers is a village 9 mi (14 km) north-east of Albert, 4 mi (6.4 km) south of Bapaume, to the east of Martinpuich, west of Lesbœufs and to the north-east of Delville Wood. The village is on the D 197 from Longueval to Ligny Thilloy. In 1916, the village was defended by the Switch Line, Flers Trench on the western outskirts, Flea Trench and Box and Cox were behind the village in front of Gird Trench and Gueudecourt. Courcelette is near the D 929 Albert–Bapaume road, 7 mi (11 km) north-east of Albert, to the north-east of Pozières and south-west of Le Sars.

Since 1 July, the BEF GHQ tactical instructions issued on 8 May had been added to but without a general tactical revision. Attention had been drawn to matters which had been neglected in the heat of battle, such as the importance of infantry skirmish lines being followed by small columns, captured ground being mopped up, avoiding the tendency to rely on hand-grenades (bombs) at the expense of the rifle, consolidation of captured ground, the benefit of machine-gun fire from the rear, the use of Lewis guns on the flanks and in outposts and the value of Stokes mortars for close-support. The wearing-out battles since late July and events elsewhere, led to a belief that the big Allied attack planned for mid-September would have more than local effect.

A general relief of the German divisions on the Somme was completed in late August; the British assessment of the number of German divisions available as reinforcements was increased to eight. GHQ Intelligence considered a German division on the British front was worn-out after 4 1/2 days and that German divisions had to spend an average of twenty days in the line before relief. Of six more German divisions moved to the Somme by 28 August, only two had been known to be in reserve, the other four having been moved from quiet sectors without warning.

Hindenburg issued new tactical instructions in Grundsätze für die Führung in der Abwehrschlacht im Stellungskrieg ("Principles of Command for Defensive Battles in Positional Warfare") which ended the emphasis on holding ground at all costs and counter-attacking every penetration. The purpose of the defensive battle was defined as allowing the attacker to wear out their infantry, using methods that conserved German infantry. Manpower was to be replaced by machine-generated firepower, using equipment built in a competitive mobilisation of domestic industry under the Hindenburg Programme, the policy rejected by Falkenhayn as futile, given the superior resources of the coalition fighting the Central Powers. Defensive practice on the Somme had already been changing towards defence in depth, to nullify Anglo-French firepower and the official adoption of the practice marked the beginning of modern defensive tactics. Ludendorff also ordered the building of the Siegfriedstellung, a new defensive system 15–20 mi (24–32 km) behind the Noyon Salient (which became known as the Hindenburg Line) to make possible a withdrawal while denying the Franco-British the chance to fight a mobile battle.

Since July German infantry had been under constant observation from aircraft and balloons, which directed huge amounts of artillery-fire accurately onto their positions and made many machine-gun attacks on German infantry. One regiment ordered men in shell-holes to dig fox-holes or cover themselves with earth for camouflage and sentries were told to keep still to avoid being seen. The German air effort in July and August had mostly been defensive, which led to much criticism from the infantry and ineffectual attempts to counter Anglo-French aerial dominance, dissipating German air strength to no effect. Anglo-French artillery observation aircraft were considered brilliant, annihilating German artillery and attacking infantry from very low altitude, causing severe anxiety among German troops, who treated all aircraft as Allied and came to believe that British and French aircraft were armoured.

Redeployment of German aircraft backfired, many losses being suffered for no result, which further undermined relations between the infantry and Die Fliegertruppen des deutschen Kaiserreiches (Imperial German Flying Corps). German artillery units preferred direct protection of their batteries to artillery observation flights, which led to more losses as the German aircraft were inferior to their opponents as well as outnumbered. Slow production of German aircraft exacerbated equipment problems and German air squadrons were equipped with a motley of designs until the arrival in August of Jagdstaffel 2 (Hauptmann [Captain] Oswald Boelcke), equipped with the Halberstadt D.II, which began to restore a measure of air superiority in September and the first Albatros D.Is, which went into action on 17 September.

=== The tank ===
==== Development ====
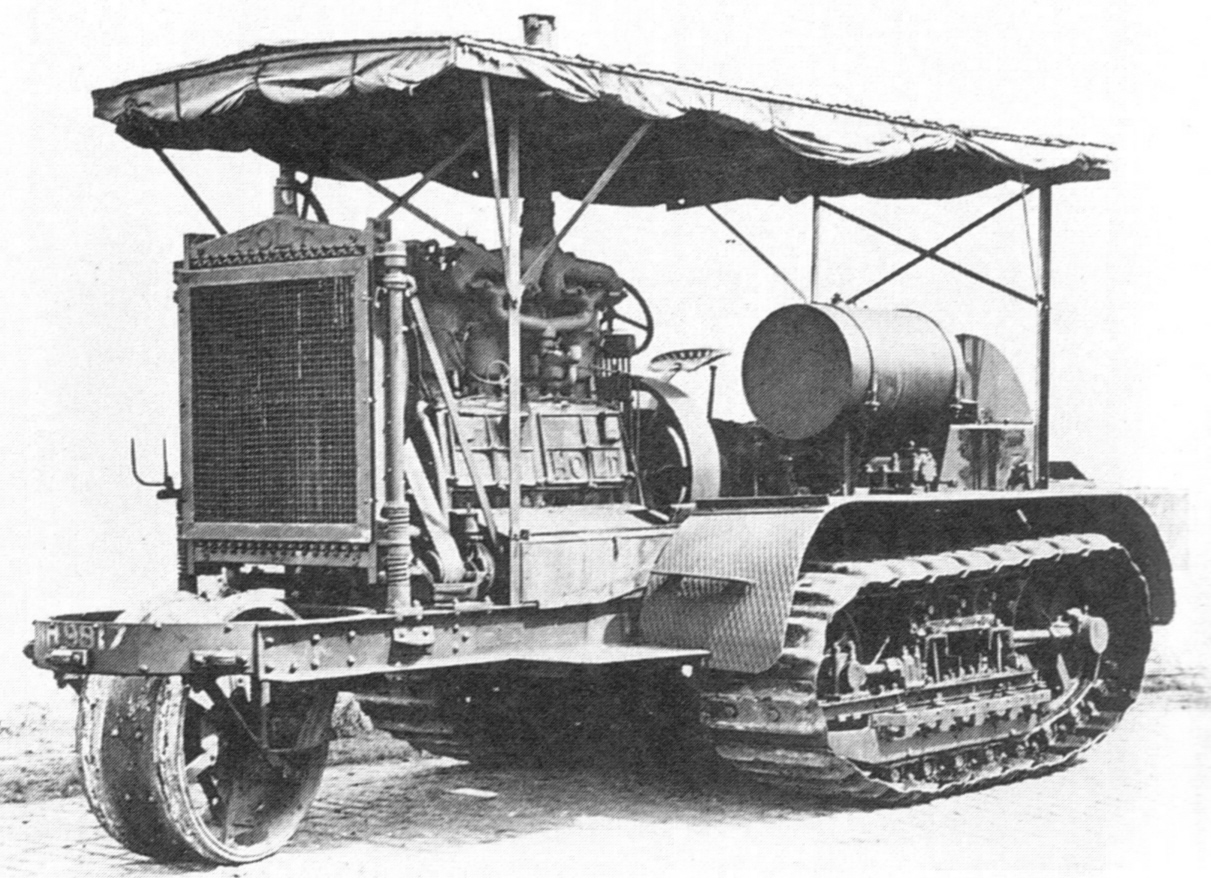
Example of a Holt tractor

Before 1914, inventors had designed armoured fighting vehicles and one design had been rejected by the Austro-Hungarian army in 1911. In 1912, Lancelot de Mole, submitted plans to the War Office for a machine which foreshadowed the tank of 1916, that was also rejected and in Berlin an inventor demonstrated a land cruiser in 1913. By 1908, the British army had adopted vehicles with caterpillar tracks to move heavy artillery and in France, Major Ernest Swinton, (Royal Engineers) heard of the cross-country, caterpillar-tracked Holt tractor in June 1914. In October, Swinton thought of a machine-gun destroyer that could cross barbed wire and trenches and discussed it at GHQ with Major-General George Fowke, the army chief engineer, who passed this on to Lieutenant-Colonel Maurice Hankey, the Secretary of the War Council. Little interest had been shown by January 1915. Swinton persuaded the War Office to set up an informal committee which in February 1915 watched a demonstration of a Holt tractor pulling a weight of 5,000 lb (2,300 kg) over trenches and barbed wire, the performance of which was judged unsatisfactory.

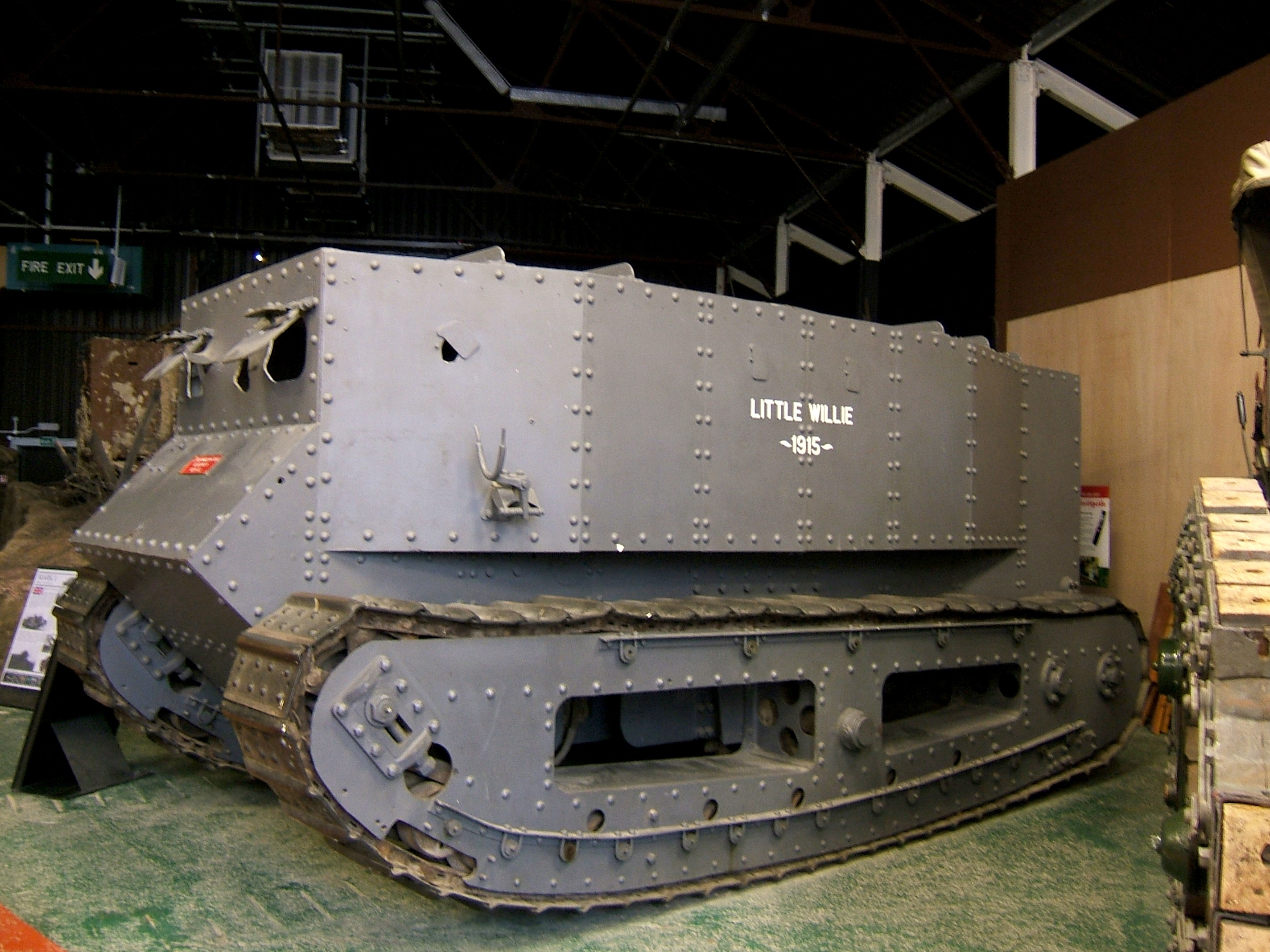
Little Willie, prototype tank

Independent of Swinton, Winston Churchill, the First Lord of the Admiralty, had in October 1914, asked for an adaptation of a 15-inch howitzer tractor for trench crossing. In January 1915, Churchill had written to the Prime Minister on the subject of an armoured caterpillar tractor to crush barbed wire and cross trenches. On 9 June, a vehicle with eight driving wheels and bridging gear was demonstrated to the War Office committee. The equipment failed to cross a double line of trenches 5 ft (1.5 m) wide and the experiment was abandoned. In parallel to these explorations, on 19 January 1915, Churchill ordered Commodore Murray Sueter, Royal Naval Air Service (RNAS) to conduct experiments with steamrollers and in February, Major Thomas Hetherington RNAS, showed Churchill designs for a land battleship. Churchill set up a Landships Committee, chaired by Eustace Tennyson d'Eyncourt, the Director of Naval Construction, to oversee the creation of an armoured vehicle to crush wire and cross trenches.

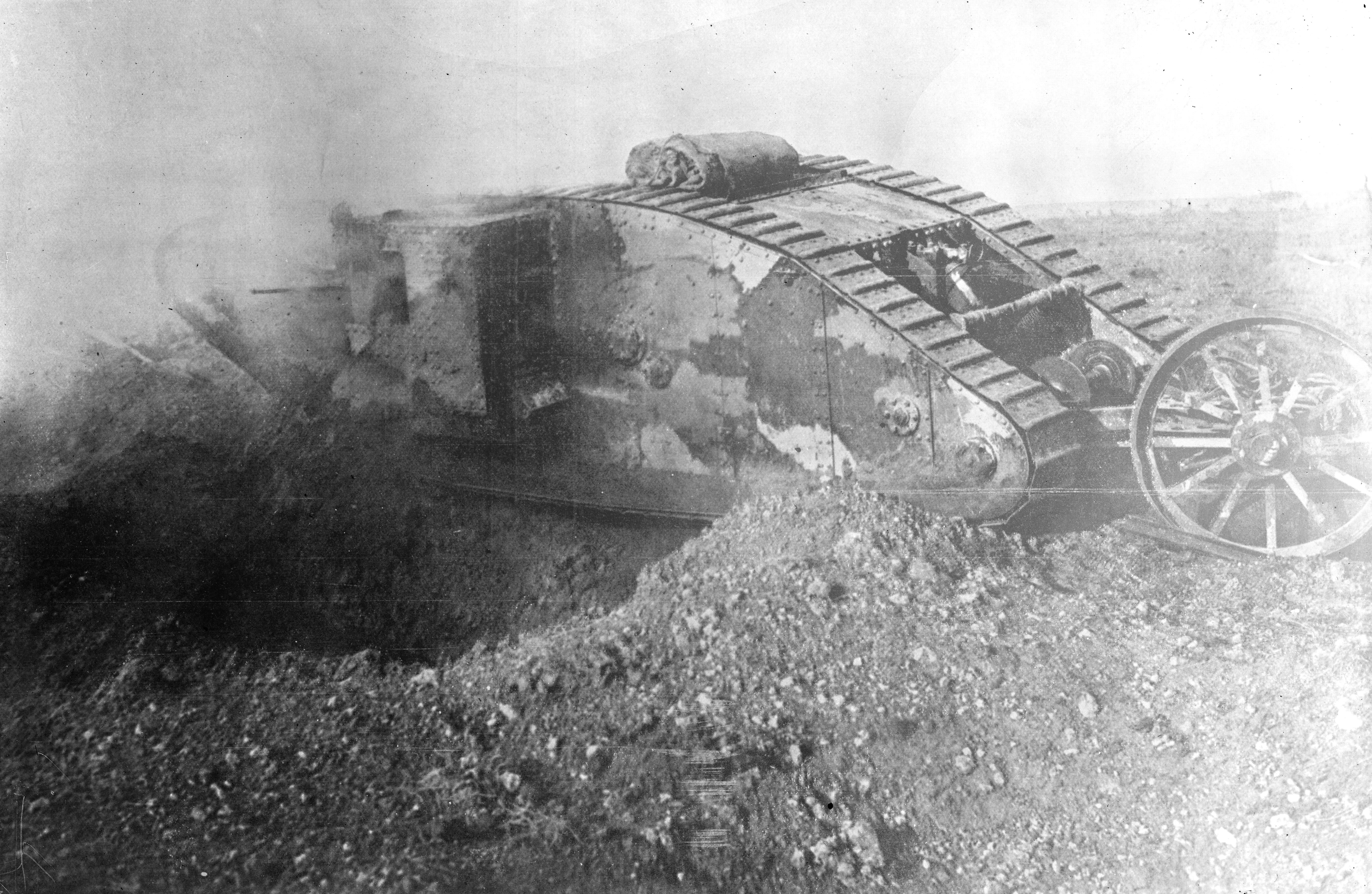
Mark I series tank

In June 1915, Sir John French, commander of the BEF found out about the ideas put forward by Swinton for caterpillar machine-gun destroyers. French sent the memoranda to the War Office, which in late June began to liaise with the Landships Committee at the Admiralty and specified the characteristics of a vehicle. Churchill had relinquished his post in the War Committee but lent his influence to the experiments and building of the tanks. By August, Swinton was able to co-ordinate the War Office specifications for the tanks, Admiralty design efforts and manufacture by the Ministry of Munitions. (Note: The square shape of the vehicle lent itself to cover names like reservoir and cistern and the term tank was adopted on 24 December 1915.) An experimental vehicle built by Fosters of Lincoln was tested in secret at Hatfield on 2 February 1916 and the results were considered so good that 100 more vehicles of the mother design and a prototype of the Mark I tank were ordered.

==== Heavy Section, Machine-Gun Corps ====
In March 1916, Swinton was given command of the new Heavy Section, Machine-Gun Corps, raised with manpower from the Motor Machine Gun Training Centre at Bisley, with an establishment of six companies with 25 tanks each, crewed by 28 officers and 255 men. Training began in great secrecy in June at Elveden in Suffolk, as soon as the first Mark I tank arrived. Two types of Mark I tank had been designed, male tanks, with a crew of eight, two 6-pounder guns and three Hotchkiss 8 mm machine-guns, a maximum speed of 3.7 mph (6.0 km/h) and a tail (two wheels at the rear to help with steering and to reduce the shock of crossing broken ground). Female tanks were similar in size, weight, speed and crew and were intended to defend the males against an infantry rush, with their armament of four Vickers machine guns, a Hotchkiss machine-gun and a much larger allotment of ammunition.

== Prelude ==
=== Early-September attacks ===
==== Tenth Army ====
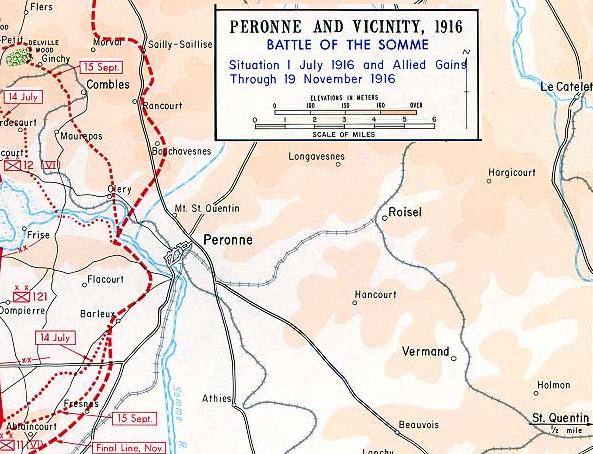
French Tenth and Sixth army areas, 1916

The French Tenth Army attacked south of the Somme on 4 September, adding to the pressure on the German defence, which had been depleted by the attritional fighting north of the Somme since July. (Military units in this section are French unless specified.) The original German front position ran from Chilly, north to Soyécourt then along the new German first line north to Barleux, which had been established after the Sixth Army advances in July. Five German divisions held the front line which ran northwards through the fortified villages of Chilly, Vermandovillers, Soyécourt, Deniécourt, Berny-en-Santerre and Barleux. A second line of defence ran from Chaulnes (behind woods to the west and north and the château park, from which the Germans had observation over the ground south of the Flaucourt plateau), Pressoir, Ablaincourt, Mazancourt and Villers-Carbonnel.

The Tenth Army had fourteen infantry and three cavalry divisions in the II, X and XXXV corps but many of their divisions had been transferred from Verdun and were understrength. The attack took place from Chilly north to Barleux, intended to gain ground on the Santerre plateau, ready to exploit a possible German collapse and then to capture crossings over the Somme south of Péronne. A four-stage advance behind a creeping barrage was planned, although reinforcements of artillery and ammunition were not available, due to the demand for resources at Verdun and north of the Somme.

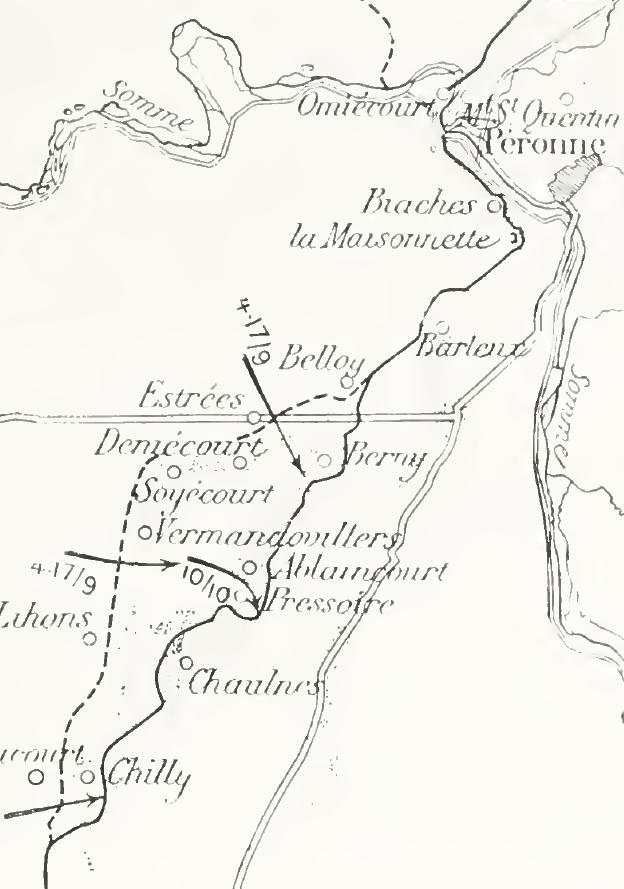
Tenth Army operations, south bank of the Somme, September 1916

Much of the destructive and counter-battery bombardment in the X and XXXV corps sectors was ineffective, against defences which the Germans had improved and reinforced with more infantry. After six days of bombardment, the attack by ten divisions began on a 17 mi (27 km) front. The five German divisions opposite were alert but X Corps captured Chilly and part of the woods in the centre of the corps front. The corps was checked on the left at Bois Blockhaus Copse, behind the German front line. In XXXV Corps in the centre, the 132nd Division briefly held Vermandovillers and the 43rd Division advanced from Bois Étoile and took Soyécourt.

The II Corps attack failed on the right flank, where German troops managed to hold the front line, the II Corps advanced in the north; at Barleux, the 77th Division was obstructed by uncut wire and the advanced troops were cut off and destroyed. German troops in front line dugouts that had not been mopped-up, emerged and stopped the supporting waves in no man's land. More ground was taken, preparatory to an attack on the second objective but the offensive was suspended on 7 September after large German counter-attacks. The French took 4,000 prisoners and Foch doubled the daily allotment of ammunition to capture the German second position. From 15 to 18 September, the Tenth Army attacked again and captured Berny, Vermandovillers, Déniecourt and several thousand more prisoners.

==== Sixth Army ====
The Sixth Army was reinforced near the river on 3 September, by XXXIII Corps with the 70th and 77th divisions astride the river and VII Corps with the 45th, 46th, 47th and 66th divisions on the left. XX Corps on the left flank of the Sixth Army was relieved by I Corps, with the 1st and 2nd divisions and several fresh or rested brigades were distributed to each corps. Control of the creeping barrage was delegated to commanders closer to the battle and a communications system using flares, Roman candles, flags and panels, telephones, optical signals, pigeons and message runners was set up to maintain contact with the front line. Four French divisions attacked north of the Somme at noon on 3 September. Cléry was subjected to a machine-gun barrage from the south bank and VII Corps captured most of the village, much of the German position along the Cléry–Le Forêt road and Le Forêt village. On the left, I Corps advanced 1 km (0.62 mi), quickly occupied high ground south of Combles and entered Bois Douage.

On 4 September, German counter-attacks at the Combles ravine stopped the French advance towards Rancourt but the French consolidated Cléry and pressed forward to the German third position. The British took Falfemont Farm further north on 5 September and linked with the French at Combles ravine. French patrols captured Ferme de l'Hôpital 0.5 mi (0.80 km) east of Le Forêt and reached a ridge behind the track from Cléry to Ferme de l'Hôpital, which forced the Germans to retire to the third position in some confusion, XX Corps taking 2,000 prisoners. VII Corps took all of Cléry and met XXXIII Corps on the right, which had captured Ommiécourt in the marshes south of the village, taking 4,200 prisoners, as French parties reached the German gun-line. An attack by I Corps failed on 6 September and attacks were delayed for six days, as the difficulty in supplying such a large force on the north bank was made worse by rain.

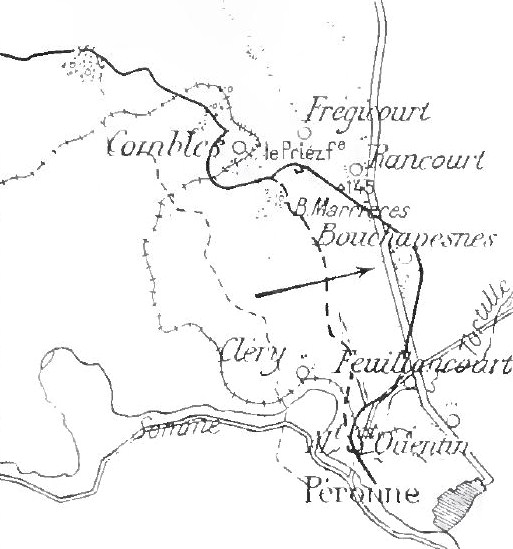
French attacks south of Combles, 12 September

Attempts by Foch and Fayolle to exploit the success before the Germans recovered failed because of the days lost to rain, the exhaustion of the I and VII corps, the lengthening of the Sixth Army front and its divergence from the line of the Fourth Army advance. A defensive flank was made on the left along Combles ravine by I Corps. V Corps was moved out of reserve and for the first time, Foch issued warning orders for the Cavalry Corps to prepare to exploit a German collapse. Transport difficulties became so bad that General Adolphe Guillaumat, the I Corps commander, ordered all stranded vehicles to be thrown off the roads and supply to continue in daylight, despite German artillery-fire, ready for the resumption of the attack on 12 September.

On 12 September, XXXIII Corps attacked towards Mont St Quentin and VII Corps attacked Bouchavesnes, taking the village and digging in facing Cléry and Feuillaucourt. I Corps took Bois d'Anderlu and broke through the German defences near Marrières Wood, before attacking northwards towards Rancourt and Sailly-Saillisel. On 13 September, I Corps closed on Le Priez Farm and VII Corps defeated several big German counter-attacks. Next day, the attacks of VII and XXXIII corps were stopped by mud and German defensive fire but I Corps managed to take Le Priez Farm. Attacks were suspended again to bring up supplies and relieve tired troops, despite the big British attack due on 15 September. Frégicourt, which overlooked part of the area to be attacked by the British, was still held by the Germans. Although Foch wanted to keep pressure on the Germans south of the river, supply priority was given to the Sixth Army; the Tenth Army met frequent German counter-attacks near Berny, which took some ground and was not able to resume its attacks.

=== German preparations ===
Weather 15–22 September 1916
| Date | Rain mm | Temp °F/°C | |
|---|---|---|---|
| 15 | 0 | 59°–43°/15°–6° | cool haze |
| 16 | 0 | 66°–41°/19°–5° | fine sun |
| 17 | 2 | 63°–45°/17°–7° | — |
| 18 | 13 | 63°–46°/17°–8° | rain |
| 19 | 3 | 55°–43°/13°–6° | wet wind |
| 20 | 1 | 61°–48°/16°–9° | rain |
| 21 | 0.1 | 59°–48°/15°–9° | dull rain |
| 22 | 0 | 64°–41°/18°–5° | mist |

Falkenhayn had been superseded on 29 August and the cessation of German attacks at Verdun was ordered by the new Oberste Heeresleitung comprising the Chief of the General Staff, Field Marshal (Generalfeldmarschall) Paul von Hindenburg and Generalquartiermeister General Erich Ludendorff. Reinforcements ordered to the Somme front by the new commanders reduced the German inferiority in guns and aircraft during September. The field artillery was able to reduce its barrage frontages from 400 to 200 yd (370 to 180 m) per battery and increased the accuracy of its bombardments by using one air artillery flight per division. Colonel (Oberst) Fritz von Loßberg, Chief of Staff of the 2nd Army, was also able to establish Ablösungsdivisionen (relief divisions) 10–15 mi (16–24 km) behind the battlefield, ready to replace the front divisions. The 2nd Army was able to mount bigger and more frequent counter-attacks, making the Anglo-French advance slower and more costly.

About five German divisions were opposite the Fourth Army, with the II Bavarian Corps (Generalleutnant Otto von Stetten), which had arrived on the Somme front from Lille in the 6th Army area, at the end of August. The 3rd Bavarian Division held the line from Martinpuich to High Wood and the 4th Bavarian Division the ground from High Wood to Delville Wood. The line eastwards was held by the 5th Bavarian Division of the III Bavarian Corps (General der Kavallerie Ludwig von Gebsattel), which had arrived from Lens, also in the 6th Army area, ten days previous. The 50th Reserve Division was in reserve behind the 3rd Bavarian Division, having been transferred from Armentières and the 6th Bavarian Division en route from the Argonne, was assembling behind the 4th and 5th Bavarian divisions. There were three trench systems, the front line being in Foureaux Riegel (Switch Trench) about 500 yd (460 m) across no man's land, along the south face of Bazentin ridge. About 1,000 yd (910 m) back on the far side of the ridge lay Flers Riegel (Flers Trench to the British) in front of the village of Flers and another 1,500 yd (1,400 m) back lay Gallwitz Riegel (Gird Trench) in front of Gueudecourt, Lesbœufs and Morval.

The Entente tactic of attacking strictly limited objectives had made the German defence more difficult and the constant Anglo-French artillery bombardments turned the German defences into crater-fields. Dugouts were caved in, barbed-wire entanglements were vaporised and trenches obliterated. German infantry took to occupying shell-holes in two- and three-man groups, about 20 yd (18 m) apart. Supporting and reserve units further back used shell-holes and any cover that could be found for shelter. Attempts to link shell-hole positions with trenches were abandoned because they were easily visible from the air and Entente artillery-observation crews directed bombardments on them. When attacks commenced, German infantry usually moved forward from such visible positions and created an advanced line of occupied shell-holes but this was often overrun during an attack. British and French infantry then set up a similar defence in shell-holes about 100 yd (91 m) beyond, before the German infantry in reserve could begin a hasty counter-attack (Gegenstoß). The Germans tried to resort to occasional methodical counter-attacks (Gegenangriffe) on a broad front, to recapture tactically valuable areas but most of these failed too, because of insufficient men, artillery and ammunition.

The German commanders expected that the British and French would continue the Somme offensive, given their superiority in numbers and equipment. In early September, Gruppe Marschall (General Wolf Freiherr Marschall von Altengottern) the headquarters of the Guard Reserve Corps, reported an increase in British activity and much artillery-fire on the front from Thiepval to Leuze Wood. The timing of the new attack was unknown and the relief of exhausted divisions continued. (Some German prisoners taken on the III Corps front on 15 September claimed that they had been warned of land cruisers with thick armour the day before. Prisoners taken near Bouleaux Wood said that Spitzgeschoß mit Kern (S.m.K., bullet with core) ammunition had been issued and that grinding noises had been heard from behind the British lines, which was taken to be mining but the "sinister, noisy sounds" had stopped during the night of 14/15 September.)

=== British preparations ===
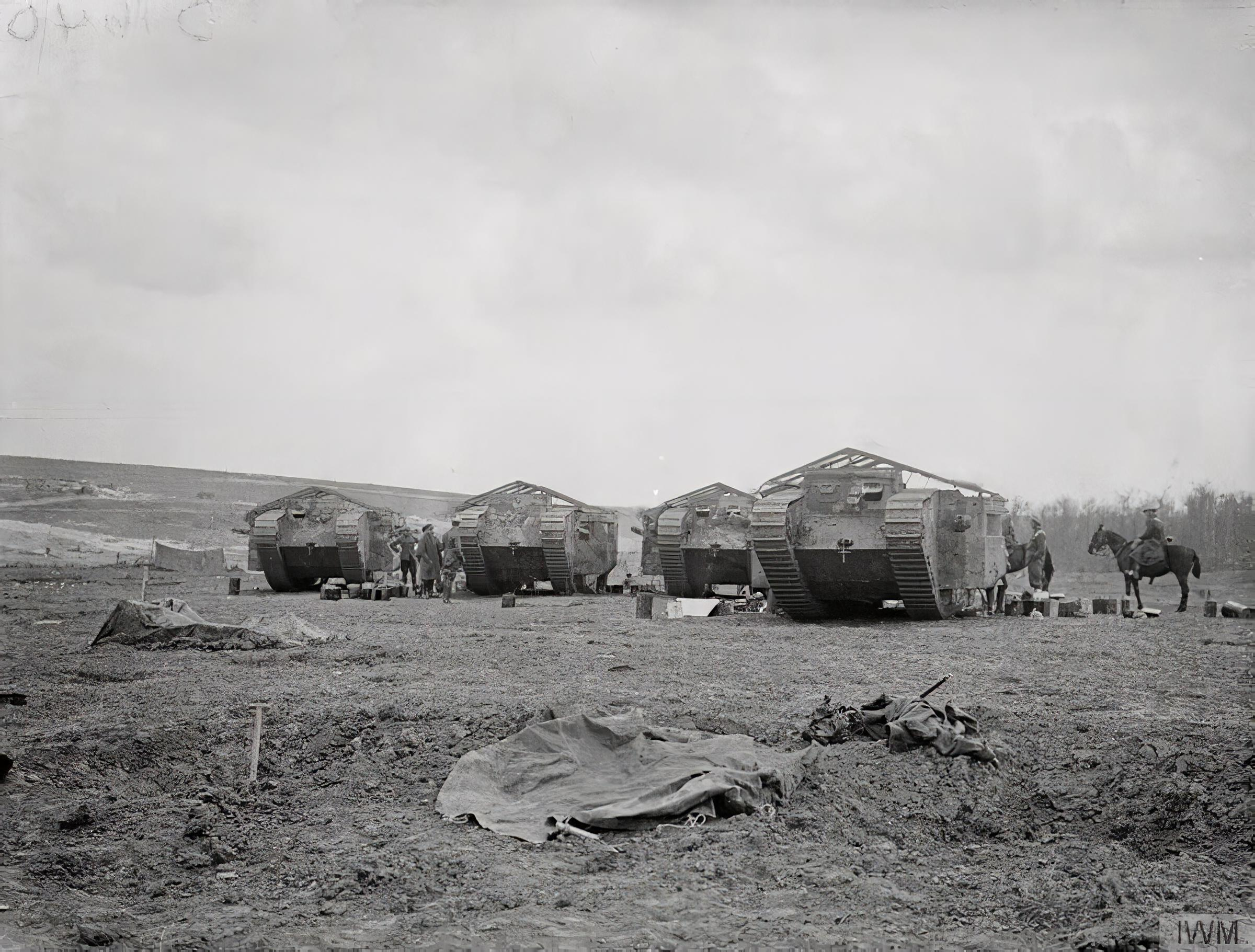
Four Mark I tanks filling with petrol, Chimpanzee Valley, 15 September

Planning for the offensive began in August and continued into September, while XIV Corps (Lieutenant-General the Earl of Cavan) was engaged on the right flank and XV Corps (Lieutenant-General John Du Cane) and III Corps (Lieutenant-General William Pulteney) were fighting for Delville and High woods. The attacks on the woods added to the burden on transport, engineer, pioneer and labour units. Repairs to damage caused by German artillery-fire diverted effort from shelter being built for fresh divisions assembling behind the front; communications were improved and new battery positions and headquarters erected, new supply dumps created, water supplies increased and carrying services organised into the ground due to be captured. The Fourth Army chief engineer, Major-General Reginald Buckland, had labour and engineer stores for road and track building and repair brought forward in preference to work on the Fourth Army (General Sir Henry Rawlinson) rear area, which was helped by new railheads at Albert and Fricourt. A broad-gauge line had been pushed up to Maricourt by 10 September and a metre-gauge track was almost as far forward as Montauban.

The Fourth Army artillery was reinforced by five 60-pounder batteries, a 6-inch howitzer battery, two 9.2-inch howitzer batteries and the field artillery of divisions that had recently arrived in France. Rawlinson wanted as much artillery as possible moved forward before the attack to avoid moves once the attack began and the batteries to move forward first were given portable bridges. XIV Corps had 244 18-pounder guns and 64 4.5-inch howitzers, four heavy siege artillery groups with a 15-inch howitzer, two 12-inch howitzers, twenty 9.2-inch, eight 8-inch and forty 6-inch howitzers, two 9.2-inch guns, twenty-eight 60-pounders and four 4.7-inch guns. XV Corps had 248 18-pounders, seventy-two 4.5-inch howitzers and five heavy and siege groups, III Corps had 228 18-pounders, sixty-four 4,5-inch howitzers and five heavy and siege groups, which amounted to a field gun or howitzer for every 10 yd (9.1 m) of front and a heavy piece every 29 yd (27 m). In the Reserve Army, the Canadian Corps had three heavy groups and the 3rd Canadian Division, forming the defensive flank, was given six field artillery brigades, with two in corps reserve for contingencies.

Experience had shown that it took six hours for orders to pass from corps headquarters to company commanders and it was now considered of great importance to issue warning orders, to give time for reconnaissance and preparation by the artillery and infantry. It had also been found that corps headquarters had become aware of the situation from the reports of aircrew on contact-patrol, where reconnaissance aircraft flew low over the battlefield to map the positions of British troops. Brigade headquarters had been ignorant of events and arrangements were made for the swift transmission of information forwards. The signalling system for a larger number of contact-patrol aircraft was established and sites for new signal stations on the ground to be attacked were chosen beforehand. If the German defences collapsed it was considered impossible to lay cables quickly and that only one telegraph from brigade, to division to corps could reasonably be expected. Relays of runners, cyclists, horse riders and motorcyclists were to be used as a supplement, with messenger-pigeons to be used in an emergency. Wireless stations were attached to infantry brigades but transmissions were slow, uncertain, caused interference with other transmitters and were open to German eavesdropping.

=== British plan ===
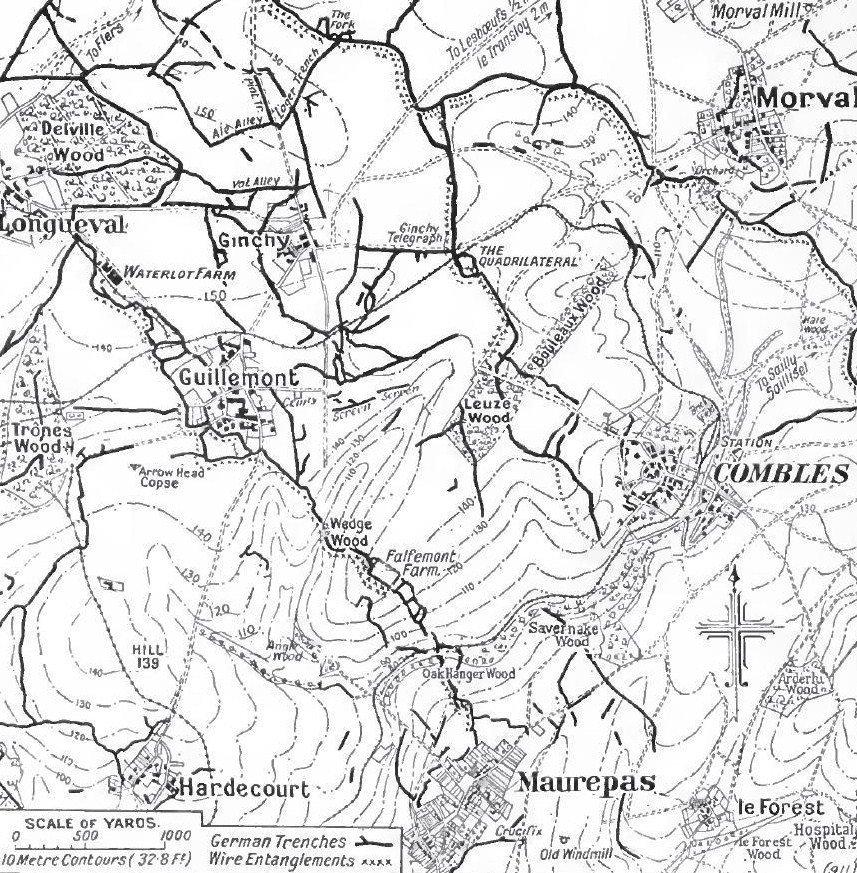
German defensive lines, vicinity of Delville Wood, Maurepas, Morval, July–September 1916

The British attack was intended to break through of the main German defences on a 3.5 mi (5.6 km) front, beginning with timetabled limited objective attacks, generally to the north-east. These were ambitious objectives and Haig required preparations to be made for the exploitation of the infantry attack by an advance of the cavalry, should the German defence collapse. Rawlinson favoured a cautious operation with methodical attacks on the German defensive positions and set the German Switch line and its connecting defences in front of Martinpuich as the first objective (Green Line). The right flank of the XIV Corps was to capture the forward slopes of the high ground to the north-west of Combles, which required an advance of 1,000 yd (910 m) from the Quadrilateral to Delville Wood and a 600 yd (550 m) advance on the rest of the front.

A second objective (Brown Line) took in the German third position covering Flers to be taken by the XV Corps and subsidiary defences from Flers to Martinpuich to be attacked by the III Corps, an advance of another 500–800 yd (460–730 m). A third objective (Blue Line) was 900–1,200 yd (820–1,100 m) beyond, at the German third position and rear defences covering Morval and Lesbœufs to be taken by the XIV Corps and Flers village (XV Corps), the line extending to the west so that the III Corps advance would be 350 yd (320 m), encircling Martinpuich and closing up to German artillery positions near Le Sars. A fourth objective (Red Line) was set 1,400–1,900 yd (1,300–1,700 m) forward of the Blue Line and was beyond Morval and Lesbœufs, to be taken by the XIV Corps and Gueudecourt by the XV Corps, from where the two corps were to form a defensive flank, from Gueudecourt to the third position past Flers, facing north-west.

The defensive flank to the north of Combles was to be extended by the right flank of XIV Corps onto slopes south-east of Morval and the French Sixth Army south of Combles was to advance to Frégicourt and Sailly-Saillisel to surround Combles from the south with a I Corps advance on Rancourt and Frégicourt to form the defensive flank; V Corps was to close up to St Pierre Vaast Wood as VII Corps attacked east of Bouchavesnes and XXXIII Corps attacked at Cléry. The III Corps on left of the Fourth Army was to link with the right flank of the Reserve Army, which at first was to conduct subsidiary operations but if the Fourth Army attack bogged down, the main effort might be transferred to the Reserve Army, to capture Thiepval and take up winter positions.

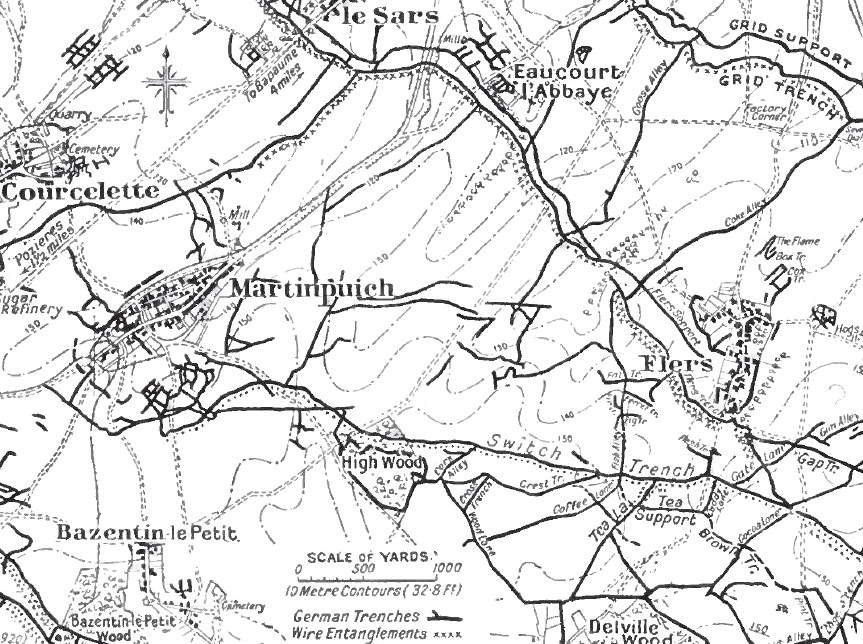
German defensive lines, Martinpuich, Le Sars and Flers area, Somme 1916

The plan for the Reserve Army was issued on 12 September for the right flank of the Canadian Corps to attack with the III Corps to capture vantage points over the German defences from Flers to Le Sars and Pys. The 2nd Canadian Division was to attack on a 1 mi (1.6 km) front from its right flank to the Ovillers–Courcelette track, a 1,000 yd (910 m) to the edge of Courcelette and a 300 yd (270 m) advance on the left with the 3rd Canadian Division providing a flank guard. The Canadian infantry were to advance after the preliminary bombardment straight on to the objective, a continuation of the Green Line. The II Corps on the left flank was to exploit chances to take ground, especially to the south of Thiepval, where cloud gas was to be released and the 49th Division was to simulate an attack with a smoke screen. North of the Ancre, V Corps was to discharge smoke and raid two places.

Zero hour was set for 6:20 a.m. British Summer Time (BST) 15 September. The Red Line was to be reached before noon, allowing for eight hours of daylight for the exploitation. Two cavalry divisions were swiftly to pass between Morval and Gueudecourt and after an all-arms force had established a defensive flank from Sailly-Saillisel to Bapaume, the rest of the Fourth Army could attack northwards and roll up the German defences. An exploitation force like that of 1 July was not assembled but the Cavalry Corps objective was high ground between Rocquigny and Bapaume and the German artillery areas from Le Sars to Warlencourt and Thilloy. The cavalry was to be supported by XIV and XV corps as quickly as possible. Railway lines that could be used to carry reinforcements, divisional and corps headquarters were to be attacked by cavalry. In an advance by all arms, priority would go to artillery moving forward to support the infantry attacks. When the Red Line was reached, the quick movement forward of the cavalry would take precedence, until the cavalry divisions had passed through, when light wagons carrying food and ammunition for the infantry would take priority. Movement of the cavalry needed strict control, lest a bottleneck develop and the re-building of roads and tracks was to commence as soon as the attack began, each division being given routes to work on.

In the XIV Corps area on the right flank, the 56th (1/1st London) Division (Major-General C. P. A. Hull) was to form a defensive flank on the north-west slope of the Combles Ravine. The 6th Division (Major-General C. Ross) had been held up by the Quadrilateral 0.5 mi (0.80 km) to the north of Leuze Wood, which lay in front of the first objective. An advance by the 56th (1/1st London) Division past Bouleaux Wood would outflank the south end of the Quadrilateral and ease the advance of the 6th Division and that of the Guards Division (Major-General Geoffrey Feilding) further north across the ridge in front towards Morval and Lesbœufs to the north-east. Three tanks were to attack the Quadrilateral and just before zero hour, three columns of three tanks each, were to attack on the front of the Guards Division.

== Battle ==
=== Sixth Army ===
By 15 September the Sixth Army needed a pause after its attacks on 12 September to relieve worn-out troops and bring forward supplies. The artillery of I Corps supported the British XIV Corps attack at dawn and its infantry attacked at 3:00 p.m., beginning a bombing fight with the Germans at Bois Douage. Ground was gained north of Le Priez Farm but no progress was made at Rancourt. V Corps, to the east, failed to reach the south side of St Pierre Vaast Wood, VII Corps made no progress east of Bouchavesnes and XXXIII Corps straightened its front. On 16 September, the Sixth Army conducted counter-battery fire in support of the British, with the infantry prepared to follow up if the Germans were forced into an extensive withdrawal. (After 16 September, V Corps extended its right flank and VI Corps took over the VII Corps front. Preparations were made for a Franco-British attack on 21 September, which was postponed until 25 September by supply difficulties and the rain. Despite the reorganisation, I Corps made two surprise attacks late on 18 September, near Combles, which gained ground. German artillery-fire in the area was extensive and counter-attacks at Cléry during the night of 19/20 September, at Le Priez Farm and Rancourt during the morning and at Bouchavesnes later, were repulsed by the French only after "desperate" fighting. South of Bouchavesnes, a German attack was defeated by VI Corps.)

=== Fourth Army ===
==== 15 September ====
===== 56th (1/1st London) Division =====
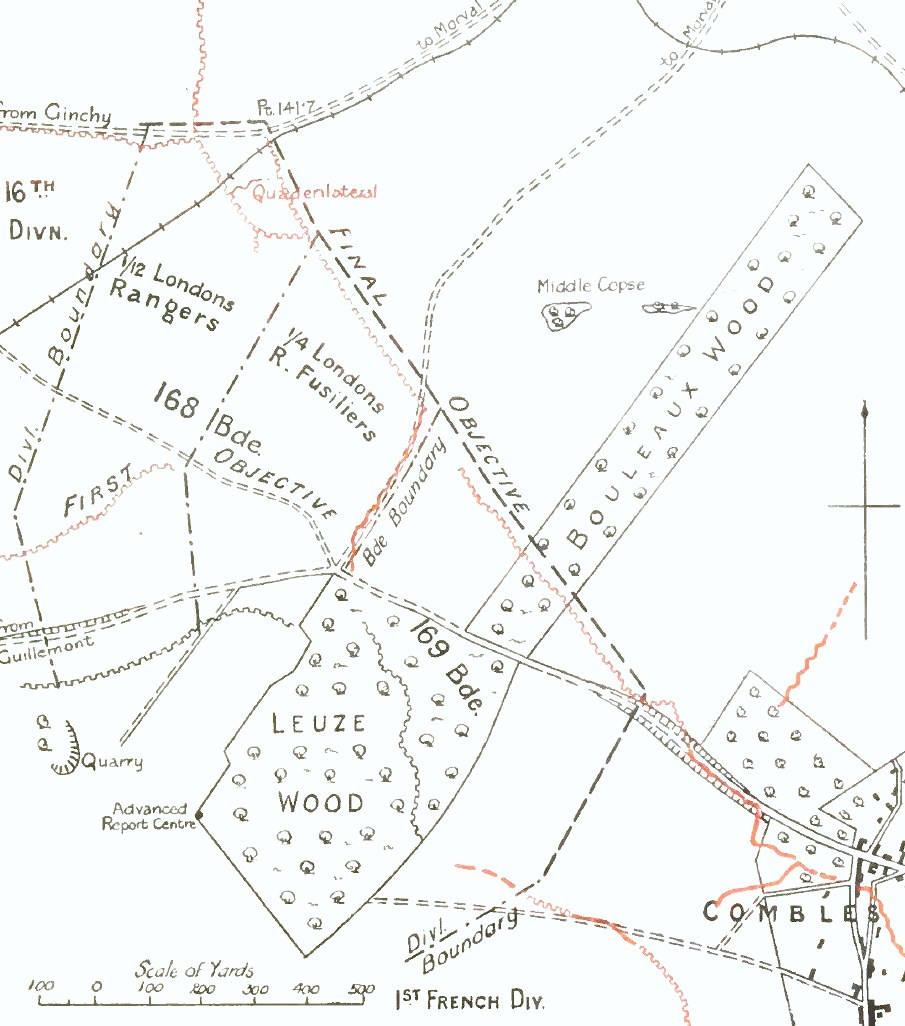
56th (1/1st London) Division operations around Leuze Wood, 15–24 September 1916

On the right of XIV Corps, the 56th (1/1st London) Division ordered the 169th Brigade (Brigadier-General Edward Coke) to capture Loop Trench across the Combles ravine, defended by Reserve Infantry Regiment 28 of the 185th Division. The brigade was to keep contact with the French in the valley. During the night, a battalion dug jumping-off trenches parallel to Combles Trench below Leuze Wood and a tank drove up to the corner of the wood by dawn. The tank set off again just before 6:00 a.m. to reach the objective with the infantry and after twenty minutes the creeping barrage began. Infantry advanced with the right wing aiming at the junction of Combles and Loop trenches and escaped a German counter-barrage which was late and easily reached the objective.

The tank was a great shock to the defenders and greatly assisted the attack. The attackers were now to swing right to capture Loop Trench and the Loop but crossfire from German machine-guns prevented this and the British began to bomb up Loop Trench and down Combles Trench, which took all day and was reinforced by another battalion and a party of bombers. The tank was knocked out near the Loop but the crew held off German bombers, inflicting many casualties, until it was set on fire five hours later and abandoned. When night fell, a block was set up in Combles Trench beyond the junction but in the Loop the British were 80 yd (73 m) short of the sunken road and an attack at 11:00 p.m. failed.

The 167th Brigade (Brigadier-General George Freeth) was to advance northwards to lengthen the defensive flank through the top end of Bouleaux Wood to overlook Combles from the north-west, clear the rest of the wood and link with the 6th Division on the left in the valley beyond. The 168th Brigade would pass through to guard the right flank as Morval was being captured and rendezvous with the French at a crossroads beyond. A 167th Brigade battalion was to advance to the first objective, capturing the German front line trench in Bouleaux Wood and north to Middle Copse. On the right flank the battalion was to bomb downhill towards Combles and link with the 169th Brigade where the Loop joined the sunken road into the village. Two tanks were allotted but one lost a track on the drive to the assembly point in the west side of Bouleaux Wood. The second tank drove slowly towards Middle Copse at 6:00 a.m. attracting much return fire but the infantry attack was stopped by uncut wire and machine-guns, the barrage being ineffectual. No man's land was too narrow to risk a bombardment and the German front line was undamaged and hidden in undergrowth. The bombing attack south-east from the wood could not begin but on the left flank, the Londoners got into the front line and advanced close to Middle Copse; the tank had driven to the end of Bouleaux Wood and then ditched. German bombers attacked the tank and the crew retreated after they had all been wounded. (Note: A pigeon from the tank carried a message at 11:00 a.m. and Hull ordered the 167th Brigade to help. RIR 28 recorded Panzerautoähnlicher Tanks (similar to armoured cars) attacking both flanks, one being destroyed by bombers.)

===== 6th Division =====
When the 6th Division attacked on the left, the preliminary bombardments, even controlled by artillery observation aircraft, had left the Quadrilateral undamaged. The position was below the crest of ground beyond Ginchy in a depression, where the wire had been overgrown; the two brigadiers and the divisional commander thought that the preparation had failed. The 16th Brigade on the right was to capture the Quadrilateral with a battalion advancing on open ground from the south-west as a company bombed along the trench to the right. The second battalion in support was then to pass through the troops on the first objective and keep going to the third, where the final two battalions were to take Morval. The 71st Brigade on the left was to attack with two battalions to capture Straight Trench and then advance to the final objective supported by the other two battalions of the brigade. Three tanks with the division were to attack the Quadrilateral but two broke down before reaching the assembly point east of Guillemont. Ross asked for the tank lane in the creeping barrage to be closed and XIV Corps, which had considered this possibility, had the order passed to the XIV Corps Commander, Royal Artillery (CRA), Brigadier-General Alexander Wardrop; by chance, his orders to the 6th Division CRA were not followed.

The surviving tank followed a railway line towards the Quadrilateral, passed through British troops at 5:50 a.m. and fired on them by mistake. An officer ran up to the tank through the gunfire and showed the crew the right direction. The tank turned north, drove parallel to Straight Trench and fired into it. The leading battalion of the 16th Brigade attacked at 6:20 a.m., advancing north-east and was quickly stopped by massed machine-gun fire, as was the second battalion which jumped off at 6:35 a.m. near the Leuze Wood–Ginchy road; bombers being stopped south-east of the Quadrilateral. The first two battalions of the 71st Brigade advanced over the front line, disappeared beyond the crest and overran an outpost but then the battalions were stopped by uncut wire and caught in machine-gun crossfire from the right and centre, which forced the survivors under cover, the tank, having already been riddled with bullets, returned when low on fuel.

===== Guards Division =====
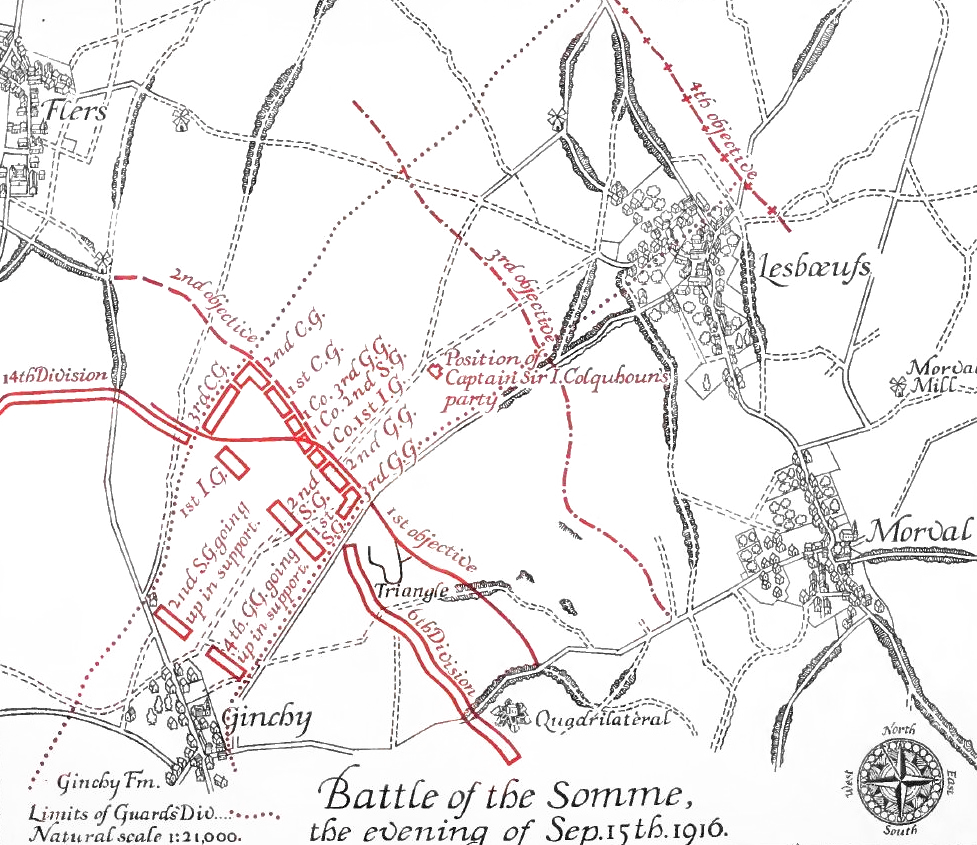
Map of the Guards Division attack, 15 September

The Guards Division brigades had to assemble on devastated ground to avoid Ginchy which was frequently bombarded and on the right the 2nd Guards Brigade (Brigadier-General John Ponsonby) assembled to the south-east of the Ginchy–Lesbœufs road, the nine waves being only 10 yd (9.1 m) apart, with four platoons abreast over 400 yd (370 m) per battalion, for lack of room. The four battalions were to advance straight to the final objective. The 1st Guards Brigade (Brigadier-General Cecil Pereira) on the left was equally cramped, with both flanks bent back. One battalion was to reach the third objective and the second was to pass through to the final objective with one battalion guarding the left flank. The right group of three tanks arrived at the Ginchy–Lesbœufs road, to drive to the south end of the Triangle on the right flank as the centre group reached the north-west point but the three centre group tanks broke down en route. The left group of three tanks to advance west of Ginchy and move up Pint Trench and Lager Lane lost a tank on the assembly and the tenth tank to support the XV Corps attacking the pocket east of Delville Wood before zero hour broke down.

The tanks advanced before zero hour but one failed to start, the rest lost direction and went east into the 6th Division area and then returned. Two tanks on the left began late, got lost and veered to the right; one ditched and the other ran short of fuel and returned, being the last tank operation with the Guards. The creeping barrage began prompt at 6:20 a.m. and the Guards followed 30 yd (27 m) behind but as the right of the 2nd Guards Brigade went north-east over the crest, massed machine-gun fire began from the Quadrilateral and Straight Trench. The Guards kept going but to the left of the intended direction, the two supporting battalions keeping close. A German party in a shell-hole position were rushed and bayoneted and the four battalions, mingled together, pressed on into the north end of the Triangle and Serpentine Trench to the left, where the wire had been well cut and the trenches devastated. I Battalion and II Battalion Bavarian Infantry Regiment 7 (BIR 7) had little artillery support and reported later that 20–30 RFC aircraft strafed them as the British advanced. Despite many casualties, the brigade overpowered the defenders and occupied part of the first objective by 7:15 a.m., the survivors of BIR 7 retiring on the III Battalion in Gallwitz Riegel.

The 1st Guards Brigade was also met with machine-gun fire from Pint Trench and Flers Road; the two leading battalions hesitated momentarily before rushing the Germans and capturing several prisoners, four machine-guns and a trench mortar. The supporting battalion had advanced, veered north and overrun a shell-hole position, then arrived on the first objective simultaneously with the 2nd Brigade. The supporting battalion had strayed over the corps boundary, leaving the Germans in possession of Serpentine Trench on either side of Calf Alley. Attempts to sort out the units were made and it was thought that the third objective, 1,300 yd (1,200 m) on had been reached; a messenger pigeon was sent back, despite a Forward Artillery Observer (FOO) realising the mistake. XIV Corps HQ found that the mist and smoke had stopped contact patrol aircraft from watching the attack; the German artillery reply cut telephone lines and caused long delays in the arrival of runners. It was thought that the Guards had moved on the third objective on time at 8:20 a.m.; the 6th Division was known to have been stopped and the 56th (1/1st London) Division was on the first objective; nothing was known of the tanks.

In the 56th (1/1st London) Division area, the 167th Brigade sent two companies to leapfrog through the leading battalion and take the third objective at 8:20 a.m. but it could not advance with the Germans still in Bouleaux Wood and even with the rest of the battalion, could only join the leading battalion in the trenches to the left of the wood. Two battalions of the 71st Brigade, 6th Division, attacked but were cut down by machine-gun fire, despite a re-bombardment of Quadrilateral Trench and Straight Trench. Parties from the 56th (1/1st London) Division got into a trench running south-east from the Quadrilateral, along with men from the 6th Division. At 9:00 a.m. Ross and Hull arranged for the 6th Division brigades to attack the Quadrilateral from the north, west and south at 1:30 p.m. as the 18th Brigade from reserve moved through the Guards Division and attacked Morval, based on the erroneous reports of the Guards' success. The 56th (1/1st London) Division was to capture Bouleaux Wood after another bombardment. Soon after the plans were laid, air reconnaissance reports reached Cavan with accurate information and the attack was cancelled. The 6th Division was ordered instead to take Straight Trench from the north at 7:30 p.m. after a bombardment by heavy artillery. The cancellation failed to reach the 1/8th Battalion Middlesex Regiment, which attacked on time and was shot down by machine-gunners of BIR 21 but by evening Middle Copse had been captured. (Note: BIR 21, on the left of the 5th Bavarian Division, saved the situation north of Bouleaux Wood, where the defences had almost collapsed for lack of men, the I and III battalions needing relief by the II Battalion overnight.)

The 2nd Guards Brigade collected bombers and captured the triangle by noon but a further advance, unsupported by the 6th Division, seemed impossible; a party of about 100 men advanced close to the third objective just below the Ginchy–Lesbœufs road. A battalion of the 1st Guards Brigade had advanced from Ginchy at 7:30 a.m. to support the advance to the third objective and kept direction to the north-east, advancing in artillery formation (a lozenge shape) and was fired on from part of Serpentine Trench. The battalion moved into line and charged, got a foothold in the trench, bombed outwards and gained touch with the battalions on the flanks, capturing the rest of the first objective. The 1st Guards Brigade battalions had reorganised, realised that they were short of the third objective, attacked again into a German bombardment and reached part of the second objective north of the corps boundary by 11:15 a.m. taking prisoner two battalion headquarters of BIR 14. Some troops joined with men from the 14th (Light) Division (Major-General Victor Couper); the attackers reported that they were on the third objective and sent back messages but contact patrol crews reported that the XIV Corps divisions were nowhere near the third objective. Late on the afternoon, BIR 7 counter-attacked and pushed a Guards party back from the Triangle but a second attack was repulsed with small-arms fire. All attacks except that of the 6th Division were cancelled until 16 September but the heavy artillery bombardment went over the crest and fell beyond the Quadrilateral. Two companies were to attack from near Leuze Wood and two down Straight Trench from the Triangle at 7:30 p.m. but only a 100 yd (91 m)-length of Straight Trench was captured.

===== 14th (Light) Division =====
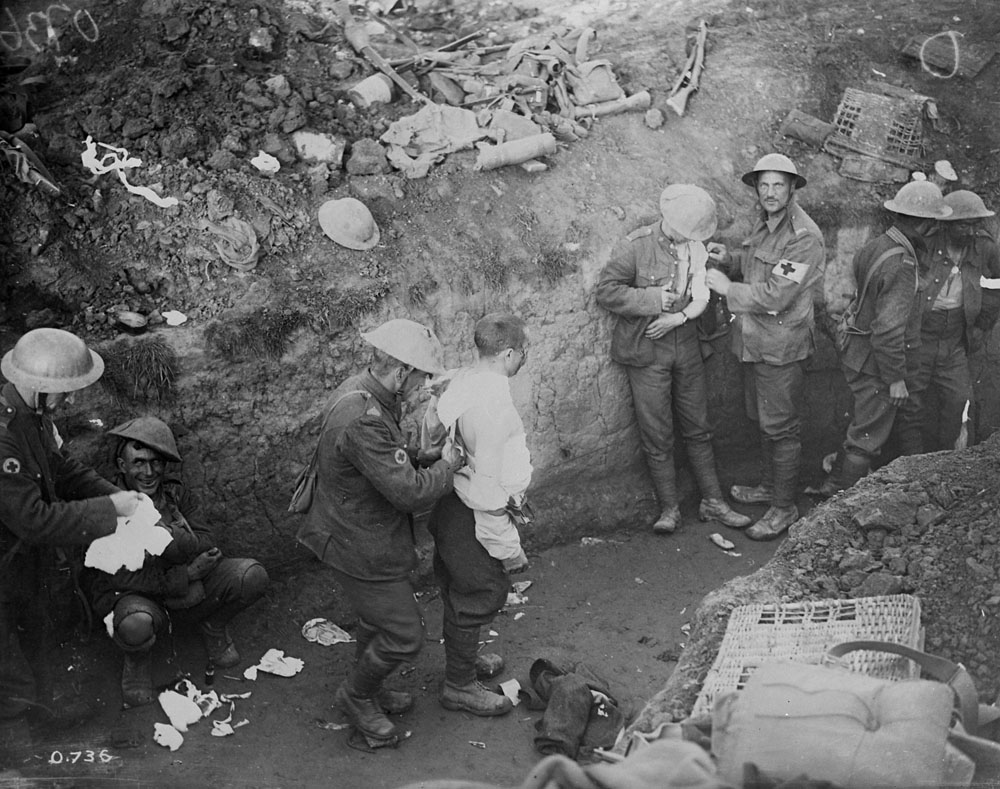
Dressing wounded in trench during the Battle of Courcelette, man on left suffering from shell shock

In the XV Corps area, on the left of the main attack, 14 of the 18 tanks in the area reached their jumping-off points, ready to attack Flers. The 14th (Light) Division attacked the small German salient east of Delville Wood with three tanks and two infantry companies; two of the tanks broke down and tank D1 advanced at 5:15 a.m. from Pilsen Lane, the bombers following a few minutes later. The Germans had been withdrawing and the tank gunners killed a few more men before it was knocked out by a shell as the infantry overran machine-gun posts and got ready for the main advance. The first two objectives were on the rise south-east of Flers and the third was on the Flers–Lesbœufs road beyond. The 41st Brigade was to take the first two and the 42nd Brigade the last. At 6:20 a.m. tank D3 drove towards Cocoa Lane, one having ditched and D5 lagged behind. Two battalions overran shell-hole positions of BIR 14, whose telephones had been cut and SOS rockets obscured.

Tea Support Trench and Pint Trench were taken with many prisoners and then the Switch Line (first objective) was captured by 7:00 a.m. Troops linked with the Guards Division on the right and formed a defensive flank on the left facing the 41st Division (Major-General Sydney Lawford) area. The two supporting battalions came up through a bombardment and suffered many casualties to shell-fire and isolated Bavarian parties. The attack on Gap Trench was forty minutes late, then troops dribbled forward and the garrison surrendered but the 41st Division was still late. The 42nd Brigade moved forward by compass past Delville Wood, deployed 400 yd (370 m) short of the Switch Line and attacked the third objective thirty minutes late; the right hand battalion was stopped just short and the left hand battalion was also caught by machine-gun fire and forced under cover. The two supporting battalions got further forward and found that the neighbouring divisions had not, enfilade fire meeting every movement.

===== 41st Division =====
The 41st Division was to attack Flers and had most tanks, four for the Longueval–Flers road and six to attack the middle and west side of the village. On the right flank the 124th Brigade attacked with two battalions forward and two in support, having assembled in no man's land. The advance began at zero hour and Tea Support Trench and the Switch Line fell relatively easily by 7:00 a.m. and Flers Trench at 7:50 a.m. At 3:20 p.m. a large party of infantry reached Bulls Road and linked with the 122nd Brigade on the left but attacks on Gird Trench failed. The 122nd Brigade had attacked with two battalions and two in support, reaching the Switch Line by 6:40 a.m. and the on to Flers Trench. Tank D15 was knocked out near the Switch Line, D14 ditched near Flers and D18 was damaged by a shell at Flers Trench but managed to withdraw. D16 entered Flers at 8:20 a.m. followed by troops of the 122nd Brigade, D6, D9 and D17 driving along the eastern fringe of the village, destroying strong points and machine-gun nests. By 10:00 a.m. the surviving Bavarians made a run for Gueudecourt and small parties of the 41st Division reached the third objective. A lull occurred from 11:00 a.m. to 1:00 p.m. then the third objective was consolidated along with Box & Cox Trench and Hogs Head. D16 was undamaged but D6 was set on fire close to Gueudecourt; D9 got to Box & Cox, along Glebe Street where it was knocked out. D17 was hit twice by artillery-fire and abandoned on the east side of Flers and recovered later.

===== New Zealand Division =====
The 2nd New Zealand Brigade (2nd NZ) of the New Zealand Division (Major-General Andrew Russell) advanced with two battalions thirty seconds early and ran into the creeping barrage. German machine-gunners in High Wood caught the troops but they were able to capture the Switch Line and Coffee Lane and dug in beyond the Switch Line by 6:50 a.m. A third battalion leapfrogged through the new line and then advanced with the creeping barrage at 7:20 a.m. and took the second objective at Flag Lane at 7:50 a.m. Two more battalions took over and captured Flers Trench and Flers Support Trench at 8:20 a.m. on the right, against small-arms fire from Flers, Abbey Road and a sunken lane. The New Zealanders had begun to dig in by 11:00 a.m. The battalion on the left was stopped by uncut wire and waited for the tanks to arrive but D10 was knocked out at Flat Trench. D11 and D12 arrived at 10:30 a.m., rolled over the wire and the infantry passed through to the last objective. Grove Alley was captured by the party withdrew at 2:30 p.m. D12 ditched west of Flers, D8 got to Abbey Road but its vision prisms were hit and D11 took guard at the Ligny road for the rest of the night. In the III Corps area, the 47th Division (Major-General Sir Charles Barter) attacked on the right with the 140th Brigade whose troops reached the Switch Line and dug in on the far slope with the New Zealanders. Four tanks had also driven forward at zero hour and two reached the south end of High Wood and then turned east onto easier ground. One tank got lost and ditched in the British front line after mistakenly firing on the troops there and the second tank got stuck in a shell crater. The third tank crossed the German line in High Wood and fired into the support line until knocked out and the fourth bogged in no man's land. The Germans in High Wood defeated the attack with machine-gun fire and a mêlée began. The two battalions of the 141st Brigade advancing on the second objective at 7:20 a.m. was drawn in and on the far right flank Flag lane was captured.

At 8:20 a.m. the 1/6th London moved through towards Cough Drop and a few men made it to Flers Trench but were repulsed. Cough Drop was held and attempts were made to dig eastwards to the New Zealanders. At 11:40 a.m. after a hurricane bombardment of 750 Stokes mortar bombs in 15 minutes, several hundred Germans in High Wood began to surrender as Londoners worked round the flanks and the wood was captured by 1:00 p.m. At 3:30 p.m. two battalions of the 142nd Brigade in reserve went forward to take the Starfish Line, one battalion moving to the east of High Wood and being stopped short of Starfish. As night fell, three companies advancing along the left side of the wood were also stopped and there was no consolidated front line except on the right at Cough Drop, where the 1/6th London were in contact with the New Zealand Division.

===== 50th Division =====
In the 50th Division (Major-General Percival Wilkinson) area, the 149th Brigade attacked with two battalions, one in support and one in reserve at zero hour and by 7:00 a.m. had captured Hook Trench and gained touch with the 150th Brigade on the left. After receiving machine-gun fire from High Wood on the right at 8:10 a.m. a battalion began to bomb down trenches towards the wood and the support and reserve battalions were sent to reinforce. Just after 10:00 a.m. a battalion reached a sunken road near The Bow and another battalion set up a defensive flank north-west of High Wood and later on portions of the Starfish Line were captured. The 150th Brigade attack had two tanks advancing ahead of the infantry and one reached Hook Trench and fired into it until hit by two shells and blown up as the other tank crossed the trench drove on to the third objective and knocked out three machine-guns on the edge of Martinpuich before returning to refuel.

The infantry attack took the first objective by 7:00 a.m. and reached parts of the third objective by 10:00 a.m. but one battalion retired to Martin Trench as its flank was exposed. Two reserve battalions were sent forward at 9:05 a.m. and around 3:30 p.m. German shelling forced one battalion to retreat to Hook Trench. About 100 men held a sunken road south of The Bow and the 150th Brigade was forced to abandon the Starfish Line and moved back to Martin Trench and Martin Alley by German bombardments. At 5:45 p.m. the 150th Brigade was ordered to attack Prue Trench and join with the 15th (Scottish) Division in Martinpuich. At 9:40 p.m. two battalions of the 151st Brigade attacked but were forced back by machine-gun fire and dug in, as did the third battalion, which attacked late at 11:00 p.m. and dug in after a short advance.

===== 15th (Scottish) Division =====
The 15th (Scottish) Division (Major-General Frederick McCracken) attacked with two battalions attached from the 23rd Division and the 45th Brigade on the right flank attacked with two battalions, one in support and three in reserve. The barrage was found to be very good and little resistance was met except at Tangle South and the Longueval–Martinpuich road. The 46th Brigade on the left attacked with all four battalions and three in support and captured Factory Lane at 7:00 a.m., touch being gained with the Canadians on the left as patrols went along the western fringe of the village. A tank moved very slowly but attacked the Germans in Bottom Trench and Tangle Trench, silenced several machine-guns in Martinpuich and then returned to refuel, returning later carrying ammunition. The second tank was knocked out before reaching its jumping-off point. When the artillery lifted off the village at 9:20 a.m. both brigades sent patrols in and around 10:00 a.m. a 46th Brigade battalion dug in on the objective and at 3:00 p.m. a 45th Brigade battalion captured the north end of the village and the ruins were occupied by the 46th Brigade and outposts were established facing Courcelette. During the night, two fresh battalions relieved the front line and gained touch with the Canadians in Gunpit Trench and on the right flank touch was gained with the 50th Division at the Martin Alley–Starfish Line junction.

==== 16–17 September ====
In the XIV Corps, the 56th (1/1st London) Division made some local attacks and with the 6th Division fired artillery on the right flank of the Guards Division. The 61st Brigade of the 20th (Light) Division (Major-General Richard Davies) as attacked to the Guards and assembled 200 yd (180 m) beyond Serpentine Trench before capturing the third objective, part of the Ginchy–Lesbœufs road and two battalions then came up to guard both flanks with Stokes mortars and machine-guns as the Germans counter-attacked on the left flank through the afternoon. It took the 3rd Guards Brigade all morning to reorganise after the attacks the previous day and it did not attack until 1:30 p.m., without artillery support. Two battalions advanced through machine-gun fire until 250 yd (230 m) short of the objective and dug in with the left flank on Punch Trench; during the night the 20th Division relieved the Guards in a rainstorm.

All of the XV Corps divisions attacked at 9:25 a.m. and on the 14th (Light) Division front the creeping barrage was poor. The right hand battalion was fired on from Gas Alley and forced under cover; west of the road from Ginchy–Gueudecourt road, the left hand battalion was also fired on from the front and the right and took cover in shell-holes. Two battalions tried to reinforce the attack but were also repulsed as was another attack at 6:55 p.m. The 41st Division attacked with the 64th Brigade attached from the 20th (Light) Division, which struggled up to the front line in a rainstorm during the night, were late and began 1,300 yd (1,200 m) behind the creeping barrage. There were many casualties from machine-guns and shrapnel shells before crossing the British front line but parties got within 100 yd (91 m) of Gird Trench. Tank D14 drove into Gueudecourt and was knocked out; the 64th Brigade reorganised at Bulls Road, where an order for another attack was too late to be followed. The 1st NZ Brigade defeated a German counter-attack along the Ligny road around 9:00 a.m. assisted by tank D11, which had stayed near the road all night. One battalion attacked at zero hour, and captured Grove Alley but the repulse of the 64th Brigade on the right led to more attacks being cancelled. D11 had advanced but a shell explosion underneath stopped the vehicle after only 300 yd (270 m); the New Zealand right was short of the Ligny road and a trench was dug back to Box & Cox.

In the III Corps, a 47th Division battalion of the 142nd Brigade attacked thirty minutes early from Crest Trench towards Cough Drop 1,300 yd (1,200 m) beyond to capture Prue Trench but after passing the Switch Line, German machine-gun fire and artillery-fire dispersed the attackers who took cover in the Starfish Line except for one company which got into Cough Drop. The 151st Brigade of the 50th Division also attacked Prue Trench east of Crescent Alley and parties from two battalions briefly occupied the objective. A battalion from the 150th Brigade also attacked but veered to the left and were repulsed and attempts to bomb down Prue Trench from Martin Alley were also abortive. The 15th (Scottish) Division was counter-attacked during the morning and Martinpuich was bombarded all day. Posts were set up nearer to 26th Avenue and the line up to the Albert–Bapaume road was taken over from the Canadians. By 17 September the Guards Division had been relieved by the 20th (Light) Division and on the right, the 60th Brigade was attacked and eventually managed to repulse the Germans. The 59th Brigade attacked at 6:30 p.m. in heavy rain to capture the third objective but machine-gun fire prevented an advance. The 14th (Light) and 41st divisions were replaced by the 21st Division (Major-General David Campbell) and the 55th (West Lancashire) Division (Major-General Hugh Jeudwine).

==== 18–22 September ====
The rain continued and turned the roads into swamps but at 5:50 a.m. in the XIV Corps area, a battalion of the 169th Brigade, 56th (1/1st London) Division attacked up the Combles road but made little progress as a battalion on the right flank managed to bomb forward slightly. The 167th Brigade was to attack the south-east face of Bouleaux Wood but was so impeded by mud and flooded shell-holes that it could not even reach the jumping-off point. A battalion each of the 16th and 18th brigades of the 6th Division attacked the Quadrilateral and Straight Trench, also at 5:50 a.m. and captured the position and a sunken road beyond. A third battalion bombed forwards from the south-east and reached the 56th (1/1st London) Division at Middle Copse. The first attack on Straight Trench failed but bombers eventually got in while a party swung left and got behind the Germans and took 140 prisoners and seven machine-guns. Signs of a counter-attack forming near Morval were seen and bombarded; the 5th Division (Major-General Reginald Stephens) began to relieve the 6th Division.

The 55th Division completed the relief of the 41st Division in the XV Corps area by 3:30 a.m. and bombers of the 1st NZ Brigade bombed up Flers Support Trench close to the Goose Alley junction. In III Corps, the 47th Division sent troops of the 140th Brigade to bomb along Flers Trench and Drop Alley to their junction and parts of two 142nd Brigade battalions attacked the Starfish Line but were only able to reinforce the party already there. Later on, German bombers counter-attacked and drove back the British towards the Starfish Line and were then repulsed during the night. At 4:30 p.m. the 50th Division attacked eastwards along the Starfish Line and Prue Alley, with two battalions and bombers of the 150th Brigade and got close to Crescent Alley as a 151st Brigade battalion tried to bomb up Crescent Trench from the south. The 15th (Scottish) Division made minor adjustments to its front line and began its relief by the 23rd Division, which also took over the Starfish Line and Prue Trench west of Crescent Alley from the 50th Division.

On 19 September, a battalion of the 2nd NZ Brigade bombed along Flers Support Trench towards Goose Alley during the evening as a battalion of the 47th Division moved up Drop Alley towards Flers Trench, the Londoners being pushed back to Cough Drop. The III Corps divisions continued to make local attacks and slowly captured the final objectives of 15 September with little opposition. The 56th (1/1st London) Division dug a trench north-east of Middle Copse and south of the copse sapped forward towards Bouleaux Wood. Next day the 47th Division was relieved by the 1st Division and the New Zealanders attacked at 8:30 p.m. with two battalions without a bombardment and captured Goose Alley as troops on the flank attacked up Drop Alley to meet the New Zealanders; a German counter-attack was defeated and Drop Alley was occupied up to Flers Trench. During the night of 20/21 September, patrols on the III Corps front found that the Germans had retired from Starfish and Prue trenches and in XIV Corps the Guards Division took over from the 20th (Light) Division. During 22 September, the III Corps divisions consolidated Starfish and Prue trenches and the 23rd Division found 26th Avenue from Courcelette to Le Sars empty.

=== German 1st Army ===
The British preparatory bombardment began on 12 September and next day, to limit casualties the number of troops in the front line was reduced to a man for every 2 yd (1.8 m) of front and three machine-gun nests with three guns each per battalion. Each man had three days' rations and two large water bottles. On the 3rd Bavarian Division front Bavarian Infantry Regiment 17 (BIR 17) was overrun and Martinpuich captured. on the left BIR 23 was able to defeat the attack on Foureaux Riegel at High Wood but was driven from the wood and the trenches from High Wood to Martinpuich later, taking up positions north and east of the village. Battalions of the 50th Reserve Regiment were sent forward and counter-attacked at 5:30 p.m. with the survivors of BIR 23 and were able to reach trenches several hundred yards from the new British front line but Martinpuich was not recaptured. After dark, the defenders improved the defences, reorganised and regained contact with flanking units ready for 16 September. The diarist of BIR 14 recorded that when the prisoners saw the supplies behind the British front, they were astonished at the plenitude, thought that Germany had no chance against such quantity and that had they had such support, they could have surpassed the British effort that day and won the war.

On the 4th Bavarian Division front, Bavarian Infantry regiments 9 and 5 (BIR 9, BIR 5) in Foureaux Riegel opposite Delville Wood were quickly overrun and BIR 18 on the right flank up to High Wood was forced back. At 5:30 a.m. the British bombardment on the area back to Flers had increased to drumfire and thirty minutes later, British troops emerged from the smoke and mist. When the creeping barrage passed over, the British rushed Foureaux Riegel and then the following waves took over and advanced towards Flers Riegel. The Germans on the rear trench of Foureaux Riegel made a determined defence but were overwhelmed and tanks "had a shattering effect on the men" when they drove along the trench parapet, firing into it as infantry threw grenades at the survivors. Returning wounded alerted BIR 5 in Flers Riegel who fired red SOS flares, sent messenger pigeons and runners to call for artillery support but none got through the bombardment being maintained on the Bavarian rear defences. Foureaux Riegel had been mopped up by 7:00 a.m. when the mist began to disperse and BIR 5 could see that the attackers were under cover in shell-holes before Flers Riegel. A tank drove along the Longueval–Flers road, unaffected by small-arms fire and stopped astride the trench and raked it with machine-gun fire, drove on and repeated the process, causing many casualties. The tank drove into Flers and emerged from the north end, moving along the Flers–Ligny road until hit by a shell, the shock of the tank led to Flers Riegel being captured followed by the village.

On the 5th Bavarian Division front the bombardment increased on 14 September, causing many casualties, cutting most telephone lines and destroying the front trenches until an overnight lull. The bombardment resumed early in the morning including gas shells and before dawn a thick mist rose, which with the gas and smoke, reduced visibility and around 6:00 a.m., troops of Bavarian Infantry Regiment 21 (BIR 21) near Ginchy were surprised to see three vehicles emerge from the mist, manoeuvring round shell-craters. The vehicles, with blue-and-white crosses, were thought to be for transporting wounded. Machine-gun fire was received from them and the Bavarians returned fire but the vehicles drove up to the edge of the trench and fired along it for several minutes. The vehicles drove away, one being hit by a shell and abandoned in no man's land. Soon afterwards a creeping barrage began to move towards the German defences and the German artillery reply was considered by survivors to be feeble. A wounded officer returning for treatment found that the batteries around Flers and Gueuedecourt did not know that the British were attacking because the telephone lines had been cut and visual signals had not been seen in the smoke and mist.

Foureaux Riegel and much of Flers Riegel had almost disappeared in the bombardment, most dugout entrances having been blocked and most of Foureaux Riegel was captured, despite isolated pockets of resistance. Troops of BIR 21 had waited in shell-holes for the creeping barrage to pass over and then engaged the British infantry as they advanced in five or six lines. The British troops lay down and tried to advance in small groups, some coming close enough to throw grenades and one party getting into a remnant of trench. The best grenade-thrower in the regiment was nearby and won the exchange, the British being shot down as they ran back across no man's land. By 9:00 a.m. the attack had been repulsed and hundreds of British dead and wounded lay in no man's land. On the right flank, Bavarian Infantry Regiment 7 (BIR 7) either side of the Ginchy–Lesbœufs road saw skirmish lines with infantry columns behind and 20–30 aircraft circling overhead, strafing the Bavarian infantry. With little artillery support the Bavarians were pushed out of the front line and lost Flers Riegel at 11:00 a.m. and II Battalion, with the survivors of the I and III battalions took post in Gallwitz Riegel but the British advance stopped short.

Beyond BIR 7, the front was defended by BIR 14, which received no artillery support despite firing SOS flares and was broken through. The battalion headquarters destroyed documents as the British approached and at one headquarters a shell blocked the dug-out and around 6:50 a.m. grenades were thrown down the steps, putting out the lights and filling the air with smoke, dust and the cries of the wounded. Soon afterwards the entrance was widened and the occupants taken prisoner. The diarist of BIR 14 wrote that British aircraft had strafed the trenches and shell-hole positions from 300–400 ft (91–122 m), causing many losses. After 9:00 a.m. officers at the regimental HQ in Gallwitz Riegel saw British infantry 1,000 yd (910 m) away, moving from Flers either side of the road to Gueudecourt and more troops advancing from Delville Wood to Flers Riegel. What was left of the regiment retreated to Gallwitz Riegel and engaged the British as they advanced downhill from Flers. Morale revived somewhat and more troops joined in, frustrating the British attacks until the British took cover in shell-holes and communication trenches, ending the attack. At 12:30 p.m. the III Battalion dribbled forward from Le Transloy into Gallwitz Riegel and on the right, BIR 5 and BRIR 5 arrived at the Flers–Ligny road, the divisional headquarters ordering that Gallwitz Riegel be held at all costs.

The 6th Bavarian Division was sent forward from Le Transloy, Barastre and Caudry, reaching Gallwitz Riegel from 1:00 p.m. and at 2:30 p.m. the 4th Bavarian Division and the right flank units of the 5th Bavarian Division were ordered to recapture Flers and Flers Riegel. The attack was poorly co-ordinated, with so many units having just arrived but parts of BIR 5 and BRIR 5 advanced west of the Flers–Gueudecourt road. The British were pushed back towards Flers, with many casualties; engineer stores and a battery of field guns were re-captured. At 4:30 p.m. two tanks emerged from the village but were knocked out by artillery. The Bavarians took over Kronprinzen Weg (later Grove Alley) 400 yd (370 m) north of the village, where machine-gunners of BIR 18 arrived along with two infantry companies. Along the Ligny–Flers road, two battalions of BIR 10 counter-attacked at 5:10 p.m. into massed small arms fire from Flers and were repulsed, a battalion retreating to Gallwitz Riegel and the other to Kronprinzen Weg. East of Flers the attack was delayed and BIR 10, 11 and 14 advanced at 6:30 p.m., by 10:30 p.m. were 50 yd (46 m) from Flers Riegel and dug in around Lieber Weg (later Gas Alley). In the 5th Bavarian Division area, the remnants of BIR 7 attacked near Lesbœufs and pushed back British troops towards Flers Riegel but could not re-capture the trench. South of Ginchy, BIR 21 had defeated the attacks all day; from 6 to 7 p.m. the British resumed the drumfire bombardment until 8:00 p.m. but no attack followed.

=== Reserve Army ===
==== 15 September ====
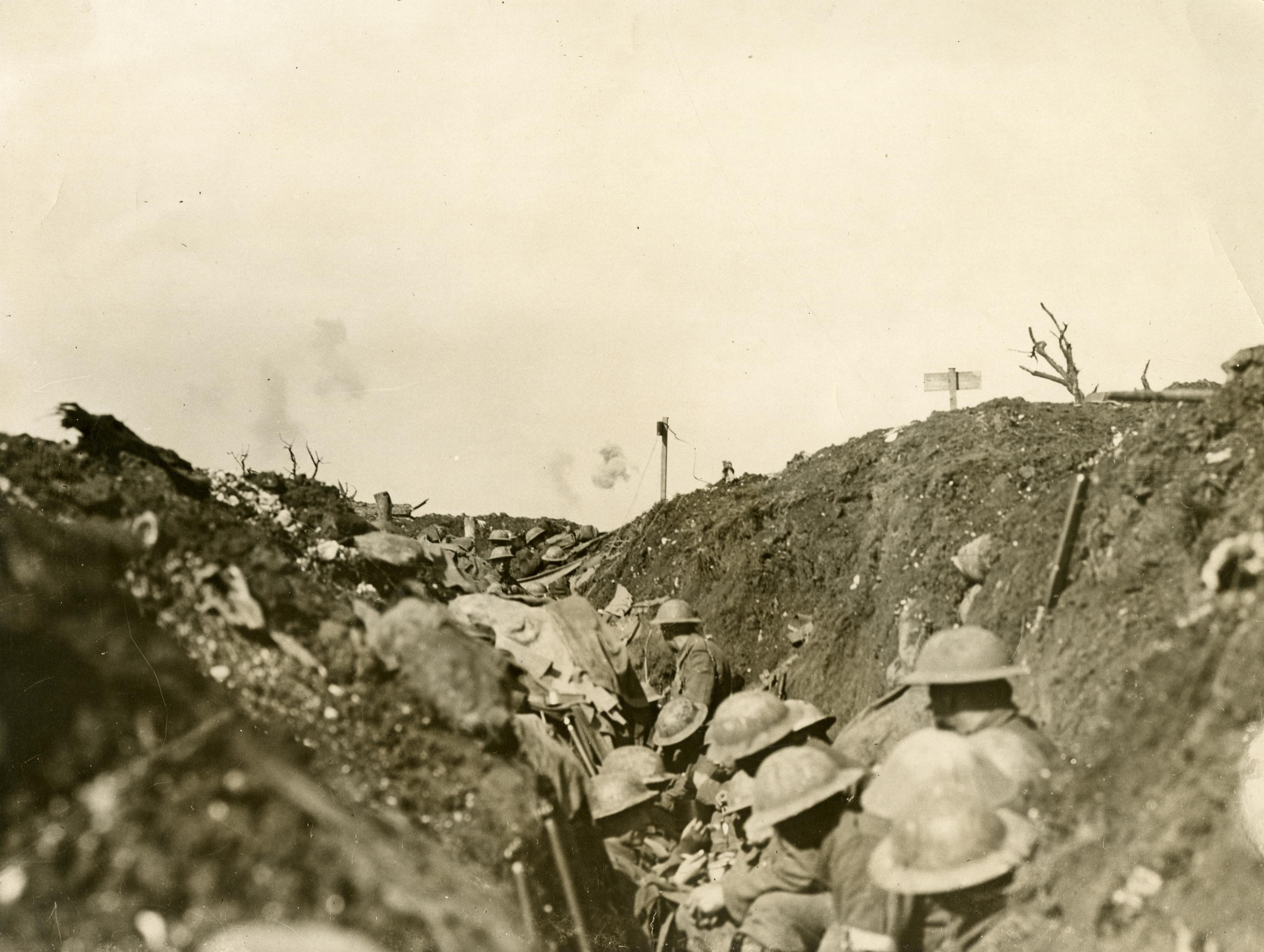
Canadian soldiers prepared to go over the top.

The Canadian Corps, on the right flank of the Reserve Army, made its début on the Somme next to the III Corps. The 2nd Canadian Division (Major-General Richard Turner) attacked with the 4th Canadian Brigade on the right of the Albert–Bapaume Road, three battalions to advance to the objective and the 6th Canadian Brigade attacked on the left with two battalions and one following battalion to mop-up. Three tanks were to advance up the Albert–Bapaume road to a sugar factory, which one tank was to attack as the other two turned right down Factory Lane, to the corps boundary with III Corps. On the left of the road in the 6th Canadian Brigade area, three tanks were to advance to Sugar Trench then to attack down it to the sugar factory from the north; the infantry and tanks were to begin together but the infantry were warned not to wait. The sound of the tanks moving up was heard by the Germans, who fired a slow barrage onto the rear areas and communication trenches but this turned out to be a planned raid against the 4th Canadian Brigade. German bombers attacked at 3:10 a.m. and 4:30 a.m., three of the Canadian battalions only just managing to repulse the Germans in time for zero hour at 6:20 a.m.

The creeping barrage began 50 yd (46 m) from the German front line, on the left flank of the 45th Reserve Division in the area of Reserve Infantry Regiment 211 (RIR 211). II Battalion was east of the road and III Battalion was on the west side and received an overhead machine-gun barrage. The Canadians met determined resistance but within fifteen minutes drove the German infantry from the front line, the 4th Canadian Brigade reaching Factory Lane at about 7:00 a.m. and finding many German dead and wounded; about 125 prisoners were taken at the sugar factory, including a battalion headquarters and groups of snipers and machine-gunners who refused to surrender were killed. The 6th Canadian Brigade made slower progress against Reserve Infantry Regiment 210 but reached the objective around 7:30 a.m., the left-hand battalion over-running a strong point on the Ovillers–Courcelette track and up McDonnell Trench, from where machine-guns could be fired eastwards along the new front line. The Canadian attack was costly but the remainder began to consolidate and patrols maintained contact with the Germans as they retreated. On the right flank, Lewis guns were set up in the sunken road from Martinpuich to Courcelette and patrols scouted Courcelette before the British bombardment ended at 7:33 a.m. The tanks had been outpaced and one ditched short of the Canadian front line but the two that reached the sugar factory found it already captured and returned, one laying 400 yd (370 m) of telephone cable. A tank in the left group broke down but the other two reached the German trenches and killed many infantry before ditching in McDonnell Trench.

On the left, the 3rd Canadian Division attacked early with the 5th Battalion, Canadian Mounted Rifles to secure the left flank, captured the objective and set up a block near Fabeck Graben, shooting down German troops as they fled. Further left, the 1st Battalion, Canadian Mounted Rifles were prevented from raiding the German lines by a bombardment; on the extreme left, raiders attacked Mouquet Farm in a smokescreen and killed fifty troops of II Battalion, RIR 212. The Canadians set up advanced posts beyond Gunpit Trench and the south fringe of Courcelette as soon as the barrage lifted at 9:20 a.m. and touch was gained with the 15th (Scottish) Division on the right. Reaching Courcelette was obstructed by German counter-attacks from the village by I Battalion, RIR 212 from reserve. At 11:10 a.m. the Canadian Corps HQ ordered the attack on the village to begin with fresh troops at 6: 15 p.m. The 22nd Battalion (French Canadian) and the 25th Battalion (Nova Scotia Rifles) arrived on time and attacked into Courcelette when the barrage lifted, occupying a line around the village, cemetery and quarry. The two battalions repulsed German counter-attacks for three days and nights (of the 800 men of the 22nd Battalion, 118 remained after three days of fighting). The 7th Canadian Brigade battalions, attacking from Sugar Trench, lost many casualties to machine-gun fire and found it hard to keep direction in the shattered landscape but captured McDonnell Trench and the east end of Fabeck Graben. The brigade linked with the 5th Canadian Brigade, except for a gap of 200 yd (180 m) at the junction of Fabeck Graben and Zollern Graben.

The left of Fabeck Graben was captured easily and prisoners were taken from II Battalion, RIR 210. At 6:30 p.m., a battalion of the 8th Canadian Brigade further west, advanced through a barrage and captured more of Fabeck Graben and formed a trench block. At 8:15 p.m. a battalion advanced from support to pass through the 7th Canadian Brigade to a line close to Zollern Graben but was prevented by difficult ground and machine-gun fire. Two companies captured a chalk pit short of the trench; a communication trench was dug forward to it and the rest of the Canadian line was reinforced. I Battalion, RIR 212 in the trenches east of Courcelette cemetery and the quarry to the north made several counter-attacks which were repulsed. Pioneers behind the Canadian lines dug several communication trenches forward despite German shell fire and engineers worked on tracks and strong points, the sugar factory being fortified and provided with water from a repaired well.

=== Air operations ===
==== 15–16 September ====
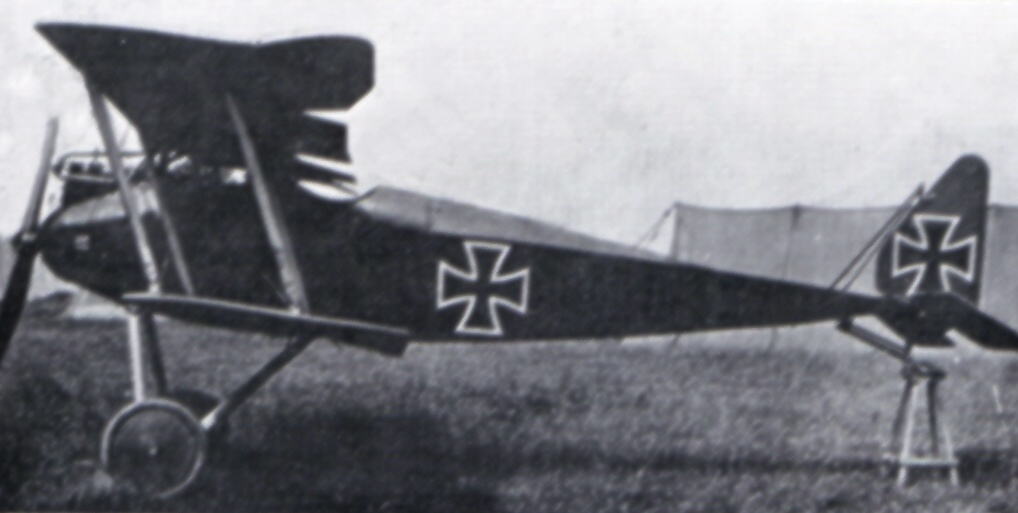
Halberstadt D.II

The corps squadrons of the Fourth and Reserve armies were busy with artillery-observation and reconnaissance sorties and bombing on the Somme front was conducted by 8, 12 and 13 squadrons of the III Brigade, the RFC squadrons flying in support of the Third Army. Headquarters 9th Wing with 27 and 21 squadrons flew longer-range sorties and bombing sorties south of the Ancre. The RFC made a maximum effort on 15 September, flying more hours and engaging more German aircraft than ever, with an unprecedented emphasis on contact patrols. At zero hour, each corps squadron sent two contact patrol aircraft over the battlefield and sent relays of aircraft to relieve them during the day. (Note: From 30 January 1916, each British army had a RFC brigade attached, which was divided into the corps wing with squadrons responsible for close reconnaissance, photography and artillery observation on the front of each army corps and an army wing which conducted long-range reconnaissance and bombing, using the aircraft types with the highest performance.) The Fourth Army and BEF HQs received information from special patrols, which provided the most accurate information yet. Contact patrol aircraft found that the infantry was much more willing to light flares when called forth by klaxon and observers found that they could identify troops at 700 ft (210 m). In good light they could see which trenches were occupied at 2,000 ft (610 m)

On the right flank, XIV Corps attacked the Quadrilateral east of Ginchy, where only one tank of 16 got into action. At 8:00 a.m., a 9 Squadron observer reported that the 6th Division had been held up but that the Guards Division on the left had advanced quickly towards the Blue Line. The Guards reported the capture of the Blue Line but the observers saw that the advanced troops were in outposts about 200 yd (180 m) short. Contact aeroplanes flew all day, many crews flying for eight hours, passing on calls for ammunition and zone calls on fleeting targets. (Note: Zones were based on lettered squares of the army 1:40,000 map; each map square was divided into four sections 3,000 yd (2,700 m) square. The observer used a call sign of the map square letter then the zone letter to signal to the artillery. All guns and howitzers up to 6 in (150 mm) that could bear on the target, opened rapid fire using corrections of aim from the air observer.) Artillery observation aircraft crews supplemented the reports of the contact patrols and engaged rapidly any German artillery batteries and troops seen in the open, the zone calls being answered by the artillery almost immediately.) The attack at Flers was watched by 3 Squadron and the first report was dropped at the XV Corps HQ at 7:20 a.m., that the infantry had followed a highly accurate creeping barrage as a stream of emergency rockets were fired from the German trenches. Within ten minutes, British signal flares were lit in the Switch Line and after another fifteen minutes, were alight all the way to Flers Avenue, south of the village. The infantry advance had been so swift that the tanks were outpaced but at 8:30 a.m., three tanks closed in on Flers and at 8:45 a.m. one was watched driving down the main road followed by infantry, who dug in on the north and west sides. In the early afternoon, an aircrew watched a tank advance towards Gueudecourt, be hit and catch fire. Reports in the afternoon showed that north of Flers, Box, Cox and The Flame trenches had been occupied, Flea Trench and Hogs Head to the north-east had been manned and XV Corps was on the Blue Line, where at 3:30 p.m. the divisions were ordered to consolidate. Aircrew observed 159 artillery batteries in action, 70 were engaged and 29 were silenced.

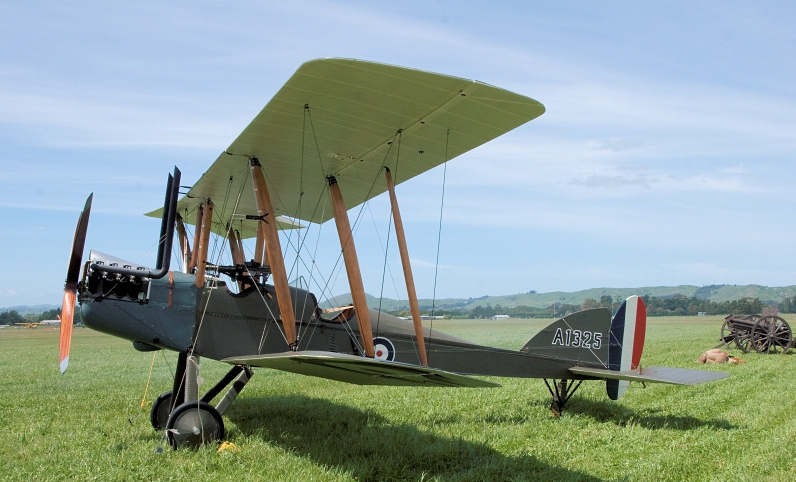
B.E.2f (A1325, Masterton, New Zealand, 2009), similar to the type flown by 34 Squadron

The Canadian attacks were observed by 7 Squadron and observers saw flares in front of Courcelette and across to Martinpuich at 7:30 a.m. The Canadian infantry captured Courcelette at 6:00 p.m. and within the hour, 7 Squadron observers reported flares in a semi-circle round the village. II Corps was watched by 34 Squadron which at 9:30 a.m. reported that the 15th (Scottish) Division had closed up to Martinpuich, the 50th (Northumbrian) Division had passed the east side of the village and that the advance at High Wood had been held up. A 34 Squadron crew dropped a message at 10:00 a.m., that a tank was ditched in the British front line, one was upended against a tree and one was on fire in the German trenches; infantry were pinned down against uncut wire by machine-gun fire and were trying to dig in. The contact crew flew back to the wood and saw that troops on both flanks had got forward and enveloped the wood. On return, the crew found that a frontal attack was being arranged and was able to get it cancelled. On another sortie, the crew reported at 12:30 p.m. that the troops who had encircled the wood had dug in and thirty minutes later, the Germans in the wood surrendered. Four German parties of infantry on the Reserve Army front were bombarded in response to zone calls.

German observation balloons were attacked by 60 Squadron (Morane Bullets), which shot down two for the loss of one aircraft, having destroyed one balloon the evening before, a disappointing result but balloons were guarded by German aircraft and increasing numbers of anti-aircraft guns. Anti-aircraft lookouts gave warnings and the ground crews winched them down quickly. British balloon observers had good visibility and telephoned reports to guide artillery onto German guns, trenches and strong points; as the infantry advanced, some balloons were moved forward and gained a view over ground previously unseen. Bombers had set out before zero hour, flew back and forth all day and dropped 8.5 long tons (8.6 t) of bombs. 27 Squadron attacked the 2nd Army HQ at Bourlon and 19 Squadron hit the château at Havrincourt, believed to be a corps HQ. Bourlon was bombed again by 27 Squadron at 9:00 a.m. with eight 112 lb (51 kg) and 16 20 lb (9.1 kg) bombs but were intercepted by German fighters on their bombing run. Four bombs were seen to hit the main building and four of the fighters were driven down, one being seen to crash, for the loss of one aircraft. At 9:45 a.m. five aircraft attacked Achiet-le-Grand and Vélu railway stations.

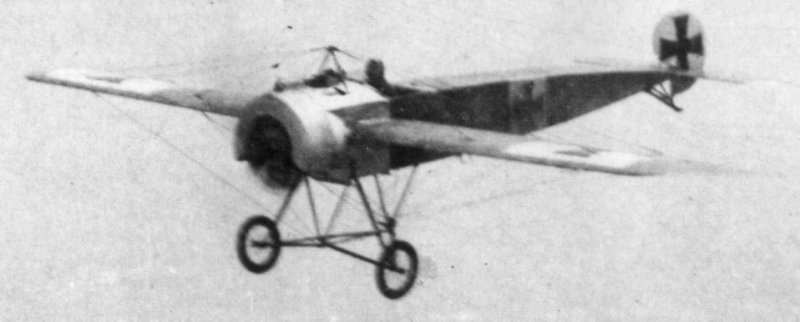
Fokker EIII fighter

A morning report from 70 Squadron was received of forty trains on the lines around Cambrai, most trains moving west, that were taken to be an infantry division on the move. At 2:00 p.m., eight Martinsyde Elephants set off to attack the trains and three dive-bombed a train entering Gouzeaucourt station, hit the engine, a carriage at the rear and German troops evacuating the train. One bomb hit an ammunition truck in the middle of the train which exploded and set off several more. The other five aircraft bombed trains at Ribécourt, Épehy and a supply dump at Bantouzelle. During the morning five bombers from 12 Squadron attacked Bapaume at low altitude and hit a train, wagons, rails and station buildings. The bombers and five FE 2 escorts of 11 Squadron, were attacked over the town and the FEs shot down four fighters which crashed and forced two to land, for the loss of two bomber crew wounded, one mortally.

Vélu station was bombed by 13 Squadron, which claimed hits on three trains, derailing coaches, 11 Squadron bombed the aerodrome and 13 Squadron raided a divisional headquarters at Château St Léger but missed the target. Further north, 60 Squadron shot down three aircraft and DH2s of 24 Squadron, attacked 17 aircraft near Morval, shot down two and another during an afternoon patrol. Two aircraft were shot down by 23 Squadron over Bapaume and a 32 Squadron pilot shot down a Roland. A dawn patrol by 70 Squadron attacked Jasta 2 and Boelcke shot down the leader over Havrincourt Wood, one aircraft force-landed behind German lines and two came back with mortally wounded observers, for three German aircraft driven down and one crashed (after a collision when attacking the returning aircraft). Six RFC aircraft were lost during the day, with nine crew missing and five wounded, three mortally, the crews claiming 14 German aircraft crashed and more driven down. During the afternoon, British patrols met little opposition, including a reconnaissance to Valenciennes and Cambrai. On 16 September, XV Wing aircraft made 179 zone calls, 12 Squadron bombed Bapaume station and an 18 Squadron aircraft flew into the cable of a 6 Section balloon, injuring the pilot and killing the balloon and aircraft observers.

==== 17–22 September ====
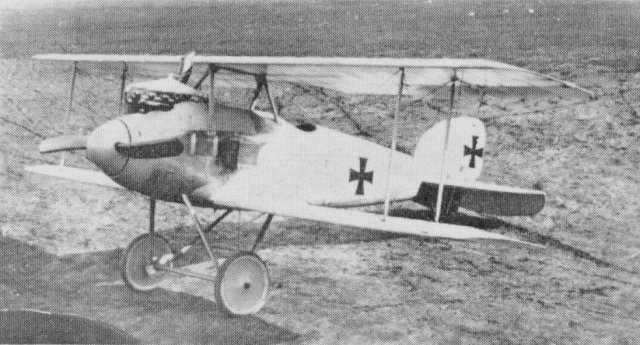
Albatros D.I

On 17 September, Boelcke, led a Jasta 2 formation of six fighters, against eight BE 2c of 12 Squadron and six FE 2b escorts of 11 Squadron, on a raid to Marcoing station. Jasta 2 and seven other German fighters shot down four of the FEs and two BEs before fighters of 60 Squadron arrived and protected the survivors. A dawn raid by 27 Squadron on Cambrai was flown without loss but an aeroplane was lost later on bombing Valenciennes, 70 Squadron lost a Sopwith 1½ Strutter over Cambrai and a 23 squadron aircraft was shot down reconnoitring the Vélu–Épehy–Marcoing area. Four German aircraft were shot down and the stations at Miraumont and Havrincourt Wood bombed without loss. Trenchard reported that 14 German aircraft managed to cross the British lines, against 2,000–3,000 British sorties over the German lines. The weather grounded the RFC on 18 September and next day 11 Squadron escorted by 60 Squadron were attacked by Jasta 2 and a Morane Bullet was shot down, an FE pilot was wounded, another force-landed in Delville Wood and the reconnaissance was abandoned. Poor weather continued for the rest of the week and curtailed flying on the Somme front.

== Aftermath ==
=== Analysis ===
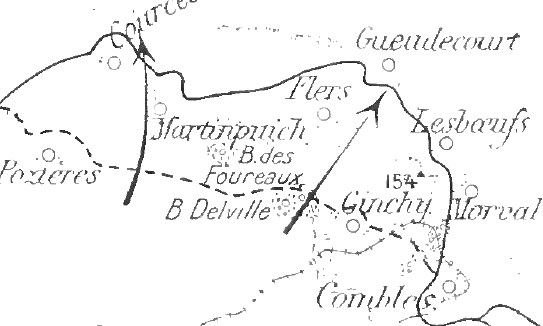
British advances during the Battle of Flers–Courcelette, 15–22 September 1916

In 2003, Gary Sheffield wrote that the verdict of Wilfrid Miles, the official historian, was accurate, the Germans "...had been dealt a severe blow" but the attack "fell far short of the desired achievement". The British advanced 2,500 yd (1.4 mi; 2.3 km) and at Flers got forward 3,500 yd (2.0 mi; 3.2 km). The German defence had almost collapsed and the British captured 4,500 yd (2.6 mi; 4.1 km) of the third position, taking about double the amount of ground taken on 1 July for about half the casualties. The Germans recovered quickly and the Fourth Army was not able to exploit the success due to exhaustion and disorganisation; on the right flank the French took little ground. The battle was a moderately successful set-piece attack by 1916 standards and the British had reached a good position to attack the rest of the German third position. Sheffield wrote that the plan had been too ambitious and mistakes were made in the use of artillery and tanks; given the inexperience of the BEF, a better result would have been surprising.

Prior and Wilson wrote in 2005 that part of the German second position had been captured and the part leading north to Le Sars had been outflanked. It appeared that German resistance in the centre was crumbling but the 41st Division had suffered many losses, its units were much intermingled and in the confusion, a brigade fell back from Flers. Reserve battalions arrived in time to prevent its re-occupation by the Germans but could not advance further. The tanks that had made it onto the battlefield had broken down or been knocked out and German troops were able to conduct several counter-attacks from Gueudecourt. Soon after 4:30 p.m. orders arrived to consolidate. The failure of the attack on the right flank by the XIV Corps divisions, where only the Guards Division reached the first objective, made it impossible for the cavalry to operate and the divisions on the left flank were making a subsidiary attack. The 41st Division and the New Zealand Division had managed swift advances with the support of some of the tanks that got to the battlefield and captured Flers behind a creeping barrage that showed that tank lanes had been unnecessary.

In 2009, J. P. Harris wrote that, unlike 1 July, the attack was a big success, High Wood, a 9,000 yd (5.1 mi; 8.2 km) length of the German first line and 4,000 yd (2.3 mi; 3.7 km) of the second line being captured, about 6 sq mi (16 km^{2}) or double the amount of 1 July, for about half the casualties. The loss rate was about the same and the divisions were exhausted by the end of the day and needed several days to recover. The tanks had broken down, bogged, got lost or knocked out and in some places, their non-appearance had led to infantry being shot down by German machine-gunners in the un-bombarded tank lanes. In other places, the tanks that did reach the German lines were a great help in destroying machine-gun nests. Harris wrote that the same results at a lower cost would have been achieved by resorting to the methodical approach favoured by Rawlinson, even if the tanks had been left out. The capture of the second position might have taken another 24–48 hours but could have left the infantry less depleted and tired, able to attack the third line sooner. The attacks ordered for 16 September were poorly executed and it rained from 17 to 21 September. French attacks were far less successful and Fayolle wanted to relieve all the divisions in the front line; during the delay, British attacks were limited to local operations, the 6th Division capturing the Quadrilateral on 18 September. It took until 25 September to attack the German third position in the Battle of Morval.

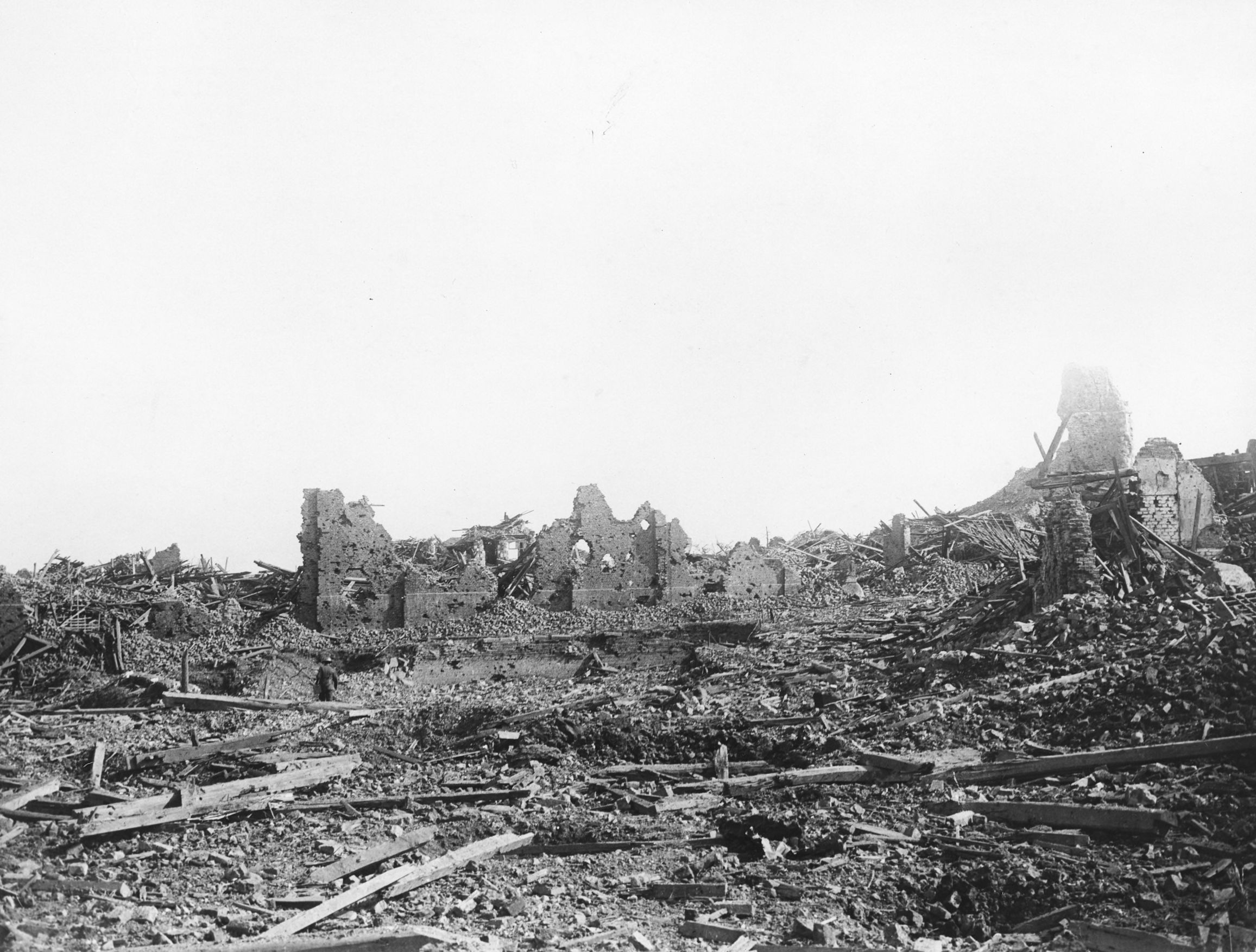
A ruined church at Courcelette.

William Philpott wrote in 2009 that German historians admitted that the defence almost collapsed on 15 September. The attack was a success because 4,000 yd (2.3 mi; 3.7 km) of the third position and all of the intermediate line had been captured, although the fastest advance had been on a flank rather than in the centre. Bigger general attacks worked better than smaller local attacks and almost had a strategic effect but this was not realised by the British commanders, the infantry dug in and the cavalry was not called forward. On 16 September, Rawlinson ordered the victory to be followed up before the Germans recovered but the attacking divisions had suffered 29,000 casualties and could only manage disjointed local line-straightening attacks, rainstorms then forced a pause in operations. A faster tempo of attacks had more potential than periodic general attacks, interspersed by numerous small attacks, by denying the Germans time to recover. Foch and Fayolle shared the optimism of the British commanders that decisive results were imminent and Below called the German losses on 15 September serious even by Somme standards, many of the German battalions losing 50 per cent of their men, depressing the morale of the survivors. The success of the big French attack on 12 September and the British attack on 15 September was followed by an attack on the southern flank by the Tenth Army from 15 to 18 September. Another rain delay interrupted the sequence but on 26 September, the French and British were able to conduct the biggest combined attack since 1 July.

Philpott wrote that English writers tended to portray the attack as an attempt to pull a weakening and demoralised French army forward and an over-optimistic attempt at a decisive battle by Haig. Philpott called this a misunderstanding, the more expansive plans insisted upon by Haig were operational schemes, not tactical directives, for an army which, by September, had become capable of emulating the French armies. It was Haig's job to think big, even if all offensives began with trench-to-trench attacks. Looked at in isolation, the September attacks appear to be more of the same, bigger but limited attrition attacks with equally limited results. Studied in context, the attacks reflected the new emphasis by Foch on a concerted offensive, given the impossibility of mounting a combined one. The French attacks in September were bigger and more numerous than the British efforts and were part of a deliberate sequence, the Sixth Army on 3, 12, 25 and 26 September, the Tenth Army on 4 and 17 September, the Fourth Army on 15, 25 and 26 September and the Reserve Army on 27 September, which brought the German defence to a crisis. The Anglo-French advanced further and faster in September, inflicting more damage on the defenders but until a faster tempo and better supply were achieved, tactical success could not be turned into a strategic victory.

=== Tanks ===
British casualties 15 September 1916
| Division | Sub-total |
| 15th | 1,854 |
| 50th | 1,207 |
| 47th | 4,000 |
| New; Zealand | 2,580 |
| 41st | 3,000 |
| 14th | 4,500 |
| Guards | 4,150 |
| 6th | 3,600 |
| 56th | 4,485 |
| Total | 29,376 |

In his 1963 biography of Haig, John Terraine wrote that after the war, Churchill held that the prospect of a great victory by using tanks en masse had been squandered by their premature use to capture "a few ruined villages". Swinton wrote that committing the few tanks available was against the advice of those who had been most involved in their development. (Notes on the Employment of Tanks, February 1916). Lloyd George wrote that a great secret was wasted on a hamlet not worth capturing. Wilfrid Miles, the official historian, wrote in 1938 that the use of the tanks on 15 September was as mistaken as the German use of gas at the Second Battle of Ypres in 1915, wasting the surprises they created. In his 1959 history of the Royal Tank Corps, Liddell Hart called the decision to use the tanks a long-odds gamble by Haig. Terraine wrote that Haig had found out about the experiments with tracked armoured vehicles in 1915 and sent observers to the 1916 trials in England, after which Haig ordered forty tanks, then increased the order to 100. Haig began to consider them as part of the equipment for the battle being planned on the Somme, three months before it commenced. When informed that 150 tanks would be ready by 31 July, he replied that he needed fifty on 1 June and stressed that the tactics of their use must be studied.

Records from GHQ in France, show that as many tanks as possible were going to be used as soon as possible but by 15 September, only 49 were ready and only 18 contributed to the battle. Terraine wrote that using tanks in mid-September was not a gamble and the real question was whether tanks could be used at all in 1916, given the slow rate of production, novelty and the need to train crews. Joffre had pressed for another combined attack as big as 1 July, being anxious about the state of the Russian army and had wanted this earlier than 15 September. Haig was equally doubtful about the fighting power of the French and Russian armies and felt that German peace feelers, captured documents showing increased war-weariness and the destruction of Austro-Hungarian units in the Brusilov Offensive, meant that a German collapse was possible. After suffering 196,000 British and 70,351 French losses on the Somme, against an estimated 200,000 German casualties (actually 243,129) by the end of August, the mid-September attack was the last opportunity for a big combined effort by the French and British in 1916. Terraine wrote that it was absurd to think that a possibly decisive weapon would not be used.

In 2009, Bill Philpott wrote that the début of the tank had been a disappointment, despite their suppression of machine-guns, because of their unreliability, which caused more losses than German counter-fire. Of the fifty tanks in France, 49 were assembled for the attack, 36 reached the British front line and 27 crossed no man's land but only six reached the third objective. On 16 September, only three tanks were operational and such losses showed that the tactics of tank warfare had yet to be developed. The tank would have to remain an accessory to a conventional attack, as part of the furniture of tactical attrition, advancing with infantry in co-operation with artillery, rather than as an independent battle-winning weapon. Despite the disappointing results, Haig ordered another 1,000 tanks. The British public was enthusiastic, after reading exaggerated press reports of their feats and in Germany, press reports dwelt on the tanks' vulnerability to armour-piercing bullets and field artillery. Geoffrey Malins, one of the photographers of the film The Battle of the Somme (released on 21 August), titled his new film The Battle of the Ancre and the Advance of the Tanks which went on view in January 1917.

For several weeks after 15 September, the Germans were puzzled about the new weapon, being unable to distinguish between accurate reports of their shape and size and more fanciful accounts. The existence of male and female tanks apparently led Germans to believe that there was a mass of specialist vehicles and the sight of a knocked-out tank north of Flers, caused an officer to conclude that it had a single, wide caterpillar track, which caused much confusion to German military intelligence. On 28 September, an intelligence officer included the report along with an accurate description and that much was still uncertain about how the vehicles were built, how many types there were or how big. Bavarian gunners taken prisoner reported that the tanks were a surprise and that the Spitzgeschoss mit Kern ( S.m.K. 'pointed projectile with core') bullets issued earlier had not been intended for anti-tank fire. The tanks that did confront German and Bavarian troops caused panic and prisoners said that it was not war but butchery. Later in the month, a German intelligence officer wrote that only time would tell if the new weapon was of any value.

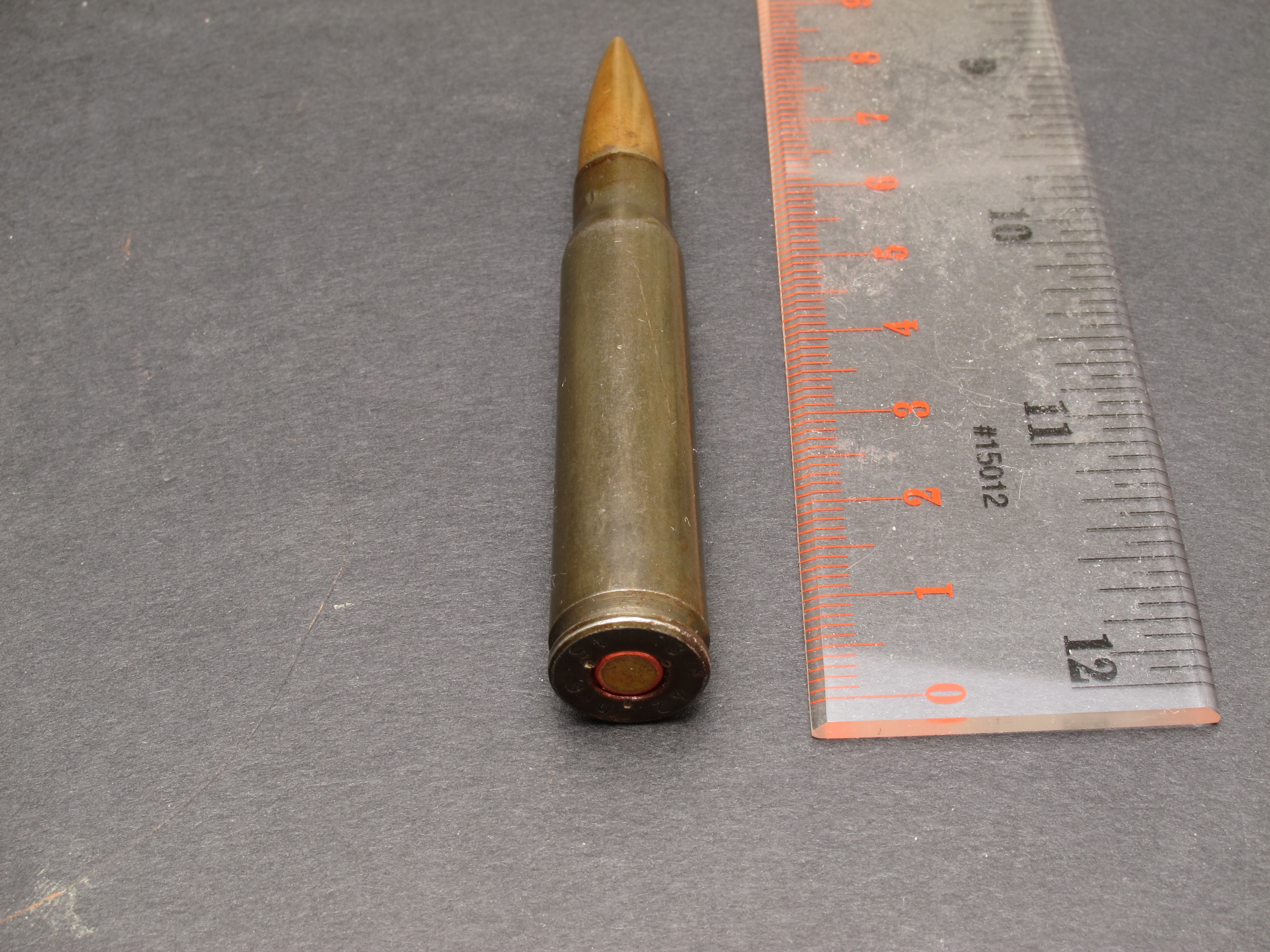
Second World War 7.92x57IS Spitzer with core, equivalent to the S.m.K. round

A month after its début, German troops were still panicking when confronted by the machines but on 28 September, a party of Germans attacked a bogged tank and managed to get on the roof, only to find that there was still no way to fire inside. Rifle-fire was seen to be futile and machine-gun fire appeared to work only with S.m.K. bullets when concentrated against one part of the armour. It was considered that a hand-grenade would be just as useless but a grenade with the heads of six more wired around it would have enough explosive power if thrown against the tracks. The advice was to lie still, rather than run, then wait for the tanks to go past, to be engaged by artillery of at least 60 mm calibre, firing at close range. Passive defences such as road obstacles were suggested but not anti-tank ditches or mines.

By the end of 1916, German interrogators were recording comments by British prisoners that tanks were only useful in certain circumstances, that it would take time for the new weapon to mature and that the Germans were equally expected to need more time to counter the tank or build their own. On 5 October, the 6th Army sent a report that the British tactic was thought to be to conceal numbers of tanks close to the front line and use them for infantry support. The British had been able to use them only in small numbers and the tanks had advanced with the infantry, halted at the German front line and fired machine-guns into it. Where gaps appeared in the German defence, the tanks had skilfully driven through and attacked the Germans on the flanks from behind, while others had driven deeper into the position to attack command posts and artillery batteries. The British were also reported to have brought up cavalry to exploit larger breaches and that when tanks had been encountered at close range, German infantry had panicked.

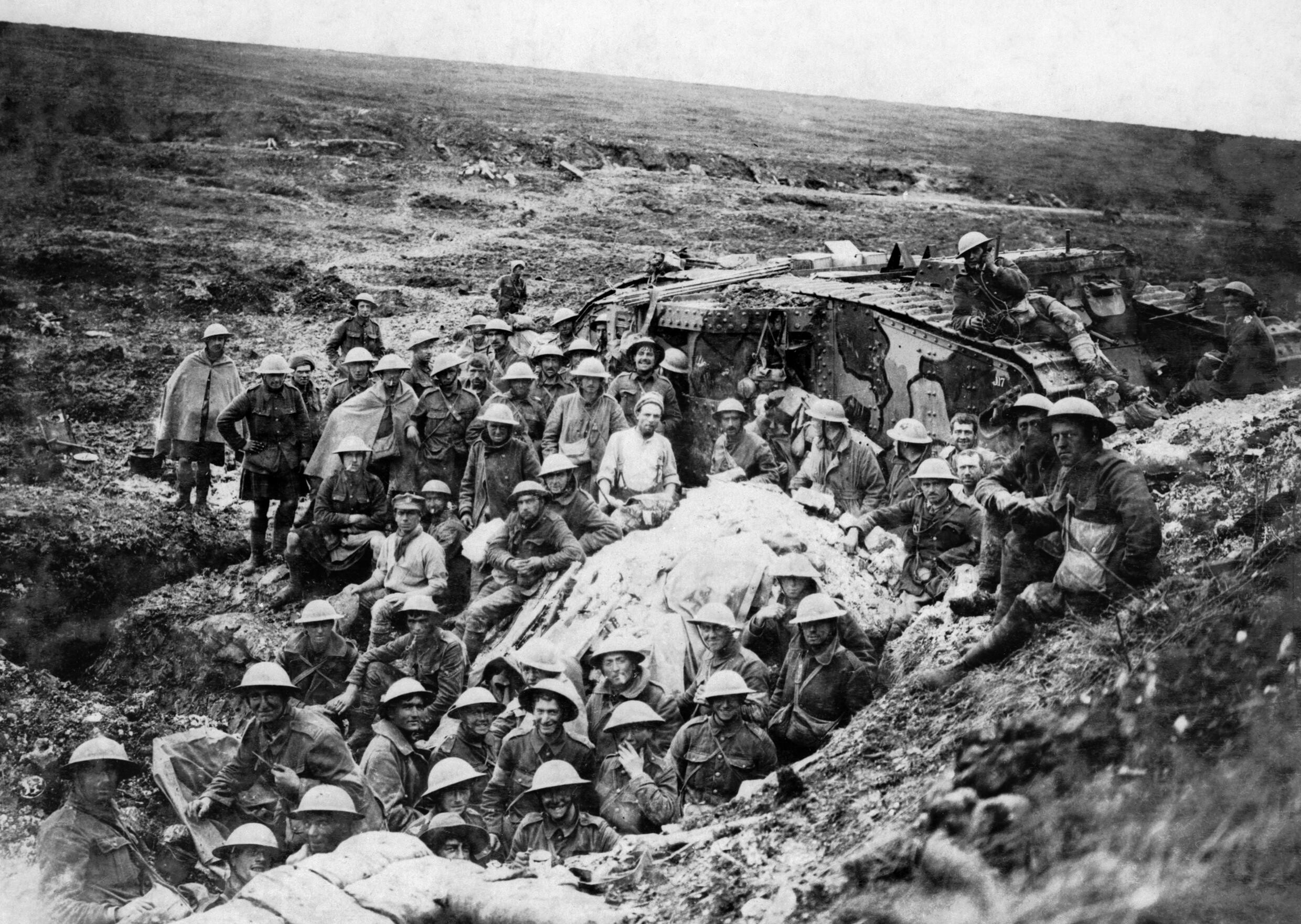
Troops with tank, Flers–Courcelette, 1916 (IWM Q 5578)

In his 2011 biography of Haig, Gary Sheffield wrote that the tanks had been slow and unreliable and were the cause of huge casualties where tank lanes had been left in the barrage. In August, after watching a demonstration, Haig had written that army thinking about the tactical use of tanks needed to be clarified. The integration of tanks into the BEF weapons system that was developing was rudimentary and Rawlinson was much less optimistic about their potential. Sheffield criticised the "20/20 hindsight" of writers who complained that using the tanks was premature and agreed with Haig that it was "folly [to fail] to use every means at my disposal in what was likely to be the crowning effort this year". With the tanks in France, the secret of their existence would have been revealed before long anyway.

=== Air operations ===
The German official historians wrote that on the Somme, air operations became vastly more important to ground operations and that

Control of the air over the battlefield had now become imperative for success.

— Der Weltkrieg, Volume XI (1938)

The 2nd Canadian Division recorded that contact patrol aircraft had been the only effective means to find the positions of its most advanced troops. German regimental histories contain frequent references to the ubiquity of the RFC, the historian of RIR 211 writing, "swarms of planes are passing over our trenches...." on 7 September and that firing at the aircraft only resulted in their trenches being bombarded,

...even when later on our own planes take to the air to free us from our disagreeable tormentors, the British reconnaissance planes do not allow themselves to be disturbed but strong enemy defensive formations pounce on our airmen who cannot dare to become seriously embroiled with such superior forces. This we had to endure all summer; from early to late enemy planes continuously overhead, watching every movement; work on the trenches as well as all arrivals and departures. Disgusting! Nerve shattering!

— RIR 211 historian

Die Fliegertruppen on the Somme had received LFG Roland D.I and Halberstadt D.II fighters early the battle, which were faster and better armed than the obsolete Fokker E.III and inflicted losses on the RFC squadrons equipped with the most inferior aircraft. Lieutenant-Colonel Hugh Dowding, requested that 60 Squadron, after losing its commander, two flight commanders, three pilots and two observers from 1 July to 3 August, be withdrawn into reserve. The commander of the RFC in France, Hugh Trenchard agreed but sacked Dowding soon after. (Note: While resting away from the front, 60 Squadron re-equipped with faster Nieuport 17 fighters.) RFC casualties increased in mid-September, due to a German reorganisation of air units according to function, Kampfeinsitzer units were combined into seven bigger Jagdstaffeln (Jastas, fighter squadrons) with new and better Albatros D.Is and hand-picked pilots, trained at Valenciennes in new tactics based on the Dicta Boelcke. The first of the new aircraft for Jasta 2 arrived on 16 September. A modest technical superiority and better tactics enabled German aircrew to challenge Anglo-French air supremacy but the more manoeuvrable British fighters, greater numbers and aggressive tactics prevented the Germans from gaining air superiority.

=== Subsequent operations ===
After the defeat in September, Hindenburg and Ludendorff sacked the 2nd Army Chief of Staff, Colonel Bronsart von Schellendorf and ordered more counter-attacks, a predictable tactic by that period and these Gegenangriffe were easily repulsed by French and British artillery and small-arms fire. Some of the best German units had been used from the river to St Pierre Vaast Wood from between 20 and 23 September, for the biggest German counter-attacks of the battle but the attempt regained none of the ground lost since 12 September. Only ten per cent of the men necessary to replace casualties could be found, even by using men from the 1917 conscription class, unfit men from garrisons in Germany, support and Landwehr troops. Increasing casualties forced the German commanders to keep divisions in the line when overdue for relief, yet to limit a division a 14-day period in the line needed a fresh division for the Somme each day and meant that by the end of the month, the German defence faltered, low morale being worsened by the news that Rumania had declared war against the Central Powers.

The Fourth Army attacked again in the Battle of Morval from 25 to 28 September and captured Morval, Gueudecourt and Lesbœufs, which had been the final objectives of the Battle of Flers–Courcelette. The main British attack had been postponed to combine with attacks by the Sixth Army on the village of Combles south of Morval, to close up to the German defences between Moislains and Le Transloy, near the Péronne–Bapaume road (N 17). The combined attack from the Somme River northwards to Martinpuich, was also intended to deprive the German defenders further west near Thiepval of reinforcements, before an attack by the Reserve Army. The postponement was extended from 21 to 25 September because of rain, which affected operations more frequently during September. The Reserve Army began the Battle of Thiepval Ridge on 26 September.

=== Victoria Cross ===
- Serjeant Donald Brown of the Otago Infantry Regiment.
- Lieutenant Colonel John Campbell of the 3rd Battalion Coldstream Guards, Guards Division.
- Lance-Sergeant Frederick McNess of the 1st Battalion Scots Guards.
- John Kerr of the 49th (Edmonton) Battalion.

== Commemoration ==
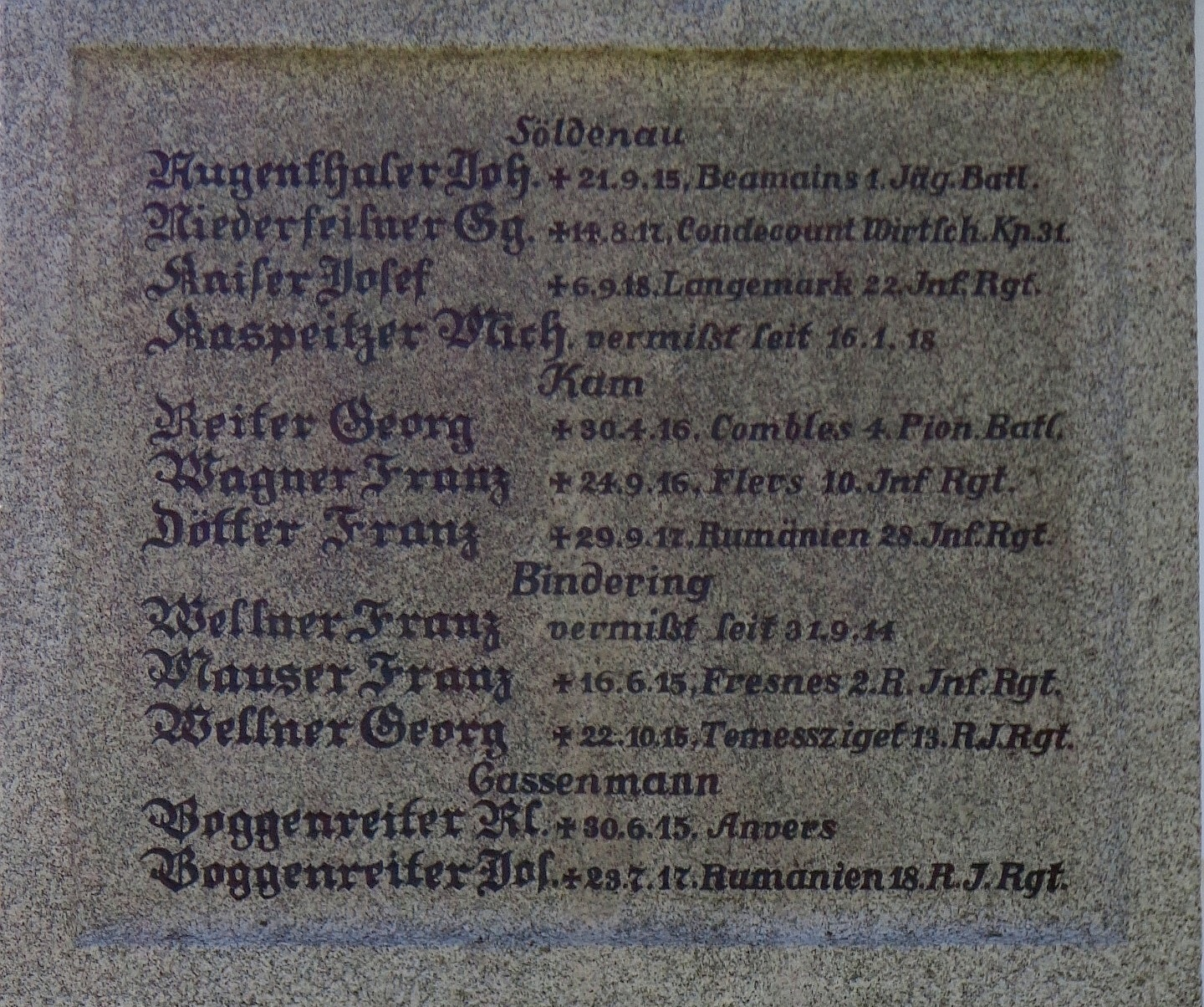
Söldenau war memorial (Ortenburg, Germany), among the dead is Franz Wagner, killed at Flers on 24 September 1916

Canadian actions on the Somme are commemorated at the Courcelette Memorial beside the D 929 (Albert–Bapaume) road, just south of the village. The New Zealand Memorial to the New Zealand Division on the Somme is found on the former site of the Switch Line, on a lane off the D 197 running north of Longueval (GPS co-ordinates 50.039501 2.801512) and the New Zealand Division memorial to the Missing in France is near the Commonwealth War Graves Commission Caterpillar Valley Cemetery, just east of Longueval. The 41st Division erected a memorial in Flers, commemorating the capture of the village; topped with a bronze battle dressed soldier, the statue is well known as the photograph on the battlefield tour guide Before Endeavours Fade (Rose Coombs). The statue by Albert Toft is the same figure used at the Royal London Fusiliers Monument in London and Oldham War Memorial. A memorial cross to the Guards Division is on the side of the C 5 road between Ginchy and Lesbœufs. A memorial cross to the 47th London Division is near the D 107 road just inside High Wood, between Martinpuich and Longueval.

== See also ==
- Tanks in World War I
- List of Canadian battles during World War I
