= Owen William Steele =

Newfoundland soldier

Owen Steele
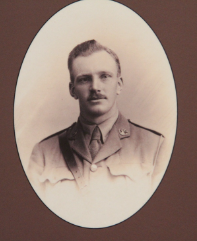
- Born: April 28, 1887; St. John's, Newfoundland Colony
- Died: July 8, 1916 (aged 29); Englebelmer, France
- Burial place: Mailly-Maillet Communal Cemetery Extension
- Education: Bishop Feild College
- Military career
- Allegiance: Newfoundland
- Rank: Lieutenant
- Unit: Royal Newfoundland Regiment
- Conflicts: Gallipoli campaign, Battle of the Somme

Owen William Steele (1887–1916) was a Newfoundland soldier and salesman who was known for his diary and letters he wrote during World War I.

== Early life ==
Owen William Steele was born in St. John's, Newfoundland, on April 28, 1887, to Samuel Owen Steele and Sarah Blanche Harris; he was the eldest of ten children. Steele received his formal education from Bishop Feild College, graduating in 1901. After he left school, Steele joined his father's business, S. O. Steele Ltd., where he stayed until 1914.

== Military career ==
Steele enlisted with the Newfoundland Regiment on September 2, 1914, making him one of the original 500, dubbed the Blue Puttees. Steele rose through the ranks quickly, becoming a corporal on September 16, and sergeant on September 21, and sergeant major on October 6. Steele and the regiment arrived in Plymouth, England, on October 14 aboard the SS Florizel. After two months in Plymouth, the regiment went to Scotland where they would stay until August 1915 before being shipped to the Mediterranean.

In September, Steele first encountered enemy fire at Sulva Bay, Turkey. Steele, who was promoted to lieutenant on October 15, stayed in Turkey as part of the British Mediterranean Expeditionary Force until January, 1916. On March 16, 1916, Steele and the regiment left the Mediterranean.

Once in France, the regiment prepared for a major allied offensive. On July 1, 1916, 801 men of the regiment went over the top at the small village of Beaumont Hamel. Steele was one of the 68 who answered roll call the next day. On July 7, an enemy shell exploded near Steele at Englebelmer, he died shortly thereafter from injuries on July 8. He was buried at Mailly-Maillet Communal Cemetery Extension.

== Legacy ==
In 1981, Memorial University was given a typescript book titled Diary of the late Lieutenant Owen W. Steele of the First Newfoundland Regiment whilst on Active Service by Steele's nephew. The book was complied by Steele's sister, Ella, who personally combed through his letters and diary to make the book. Steele's first hand account of the war is considered to be one of the best sources of what the average Newfoundlander experienced throughout the war.

== See also ==
- Francis Lind, another Newfoundland soldier whose letters were complied in a book titled The letters of Mayo Lind
