= 16th (Service) Battalion, Sherwood Foresters (Chatsworth Rifles) =

- Active: 16 April 1915–19 June 1918
- Allegiance: United Kingdom
- Branch: New Army
- Type: Pals battalion
- Role: Infantry
- Size: One Battalion
- Part of: 39th Division
- Garrison/HQ: Derby
- Patron: Victor Cavendish, 9th Duke of Devonshire
- Engagements: Battle of the Somme; Battle of the Ancre; Third Battle of Ypres; German spring offensive

The 16th (Service) Battalion, Sherwood Foresters (Chatsworth Rifles), ('16th Sherwoods') was an infantry unit recruited from Derbyshire as part of 'Kitchener's Army' in World War I. It served on the Western Front, distinguishing itself at the battles of the Somme (when it defended the Schwaben Redoubt) and the Ancre (when it captured St Pierre-Divion). It fought through the Third Battle of Ypres, when one of its men won the Victoria Cross (VC), and the German spring offensives. After its losses the battalion was reduced to a training cadre for the rest of the war, helping to prepare newly arrived US troops and others for Trench warfare. It was disbanded in 1919.

== Recruitment ==
Alfred Leete's recruitment poster for Kitchener's Army.

On 6 August 1914, less than 48 hours after Britain's declaration of war, Parliament sanctioned an increase of 500,000 men for the Regular British Army. The newly appointed Secretary of State for War, Earl Kitchener of Khartoum, issued his famous call to arms: 'Your King and Country Need You', urging the first 100,000 volunteers to come forward. Men flooded into the recruiting offices and the 'first hundred thousand' were enlisted within days. This group of six divisions with supporting arms became known as Kitchener's First New Army, or 'K1'. The K2, K3 and K4 battalions, brigades and divisions followed soon afterwards. But the flood of volunteers overwhelmed the ability of the Army to absorb them, and the K5 units were largely raised by local initiative rather than at regimental depots, often from men from particular localities or backgrounds who wished to serve together: these were known as 'Pals battalions'. The 'Pals' phenomenon quickly spread across the country, as local recruiting committees offered complete units to the War Office (WO). One such unit was the Chatsworth Rifles raised at Derby by the Duke of Devonshire of Chatsworth House with the Derbyshire Territorial Force Association. The battalion was authorised by the WO on 16 April 1915 as the 16th (Service) Battalion of the Sherwood Foresters (Nottinghamshire and Derbyshire Regiment). (Note: The original 'Chatsworth Rifles' were the 2nd Derbyshire Militia, formed in 1855, which by 1914 had become the 3rd (Reserve) Bn Sherwood Foresters.)

The secretary of the Derbyshire TF Association, Cecil Herbert-Stepney (a retired Captain in the King's Royal Rifle Corps), was appointed as the first commanding officer (CO) of the battalion on 1 May with the rank of Lieutenant-Colonel.

== Training ==
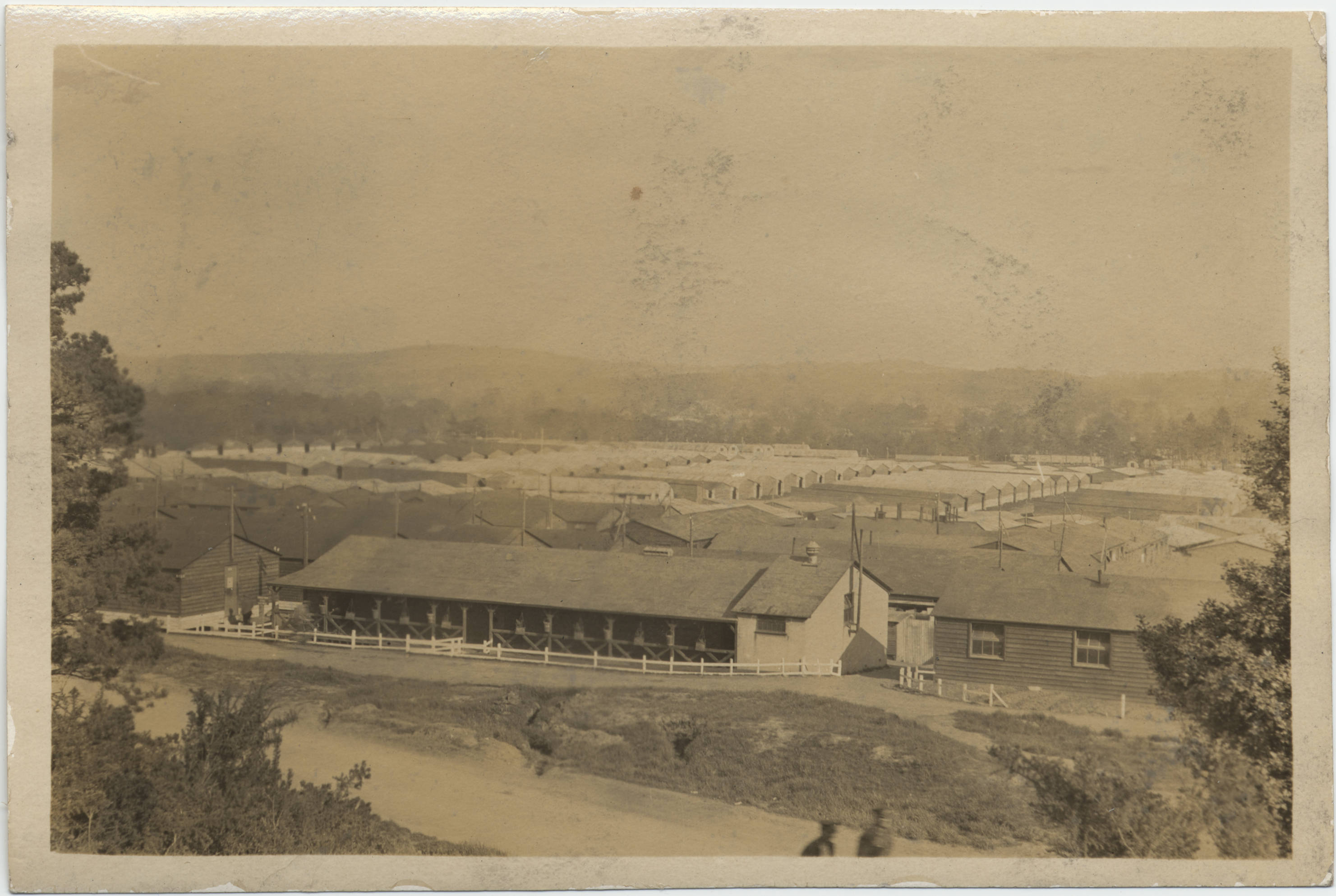
Witley Camp, where 16th Sherwood Foresters trained.

16th Sherwoods moved to Buxton on 4 May, and then on 8 June to Redmires Camp near Sheffield, where it continued basic training. The battalion formally became part of 117th Brigade when that was formed on 15 July in 39th Division. It was brigaded with three other pals battalions: the 17th (Service) Battalion, Sherwood Foresters (Welbeck Rangers), the 17th (Service) Battalion, King's Royal Rifle Corps (British Empire League) (17th KRRC) and the 16th (Service) Battalion, Rifle Brigade (St Pancras) (16th RB). In September the battalion moved to Hursley Park, near Winchester, where the division was forming. On 30 September 117th Bde moved to Marlborough Lines at Aldershot, with 16th Sherwoods occupying Oudenarde Barracks. The battalions then began progressive training, at platoon, company and finally battalion level, while specialist sections such as machine gunners, signallers and bombers were formed and trained. On 8 November 16th Sherwoods carried out a route march to Witley Camp in Surrey, where training emphasised entrenching; apart from a brief spell back at Aldershot in January 1916 to carry out its musketry course with newly issued rifles, 16th Sherwoods remained at Witley for the rest of its training.

=== 19th (Reserve) Battalion ===
The battalion's depot companies were amalgamated with those of the 15th (Nottingham Bantams) and 17th (Welbeck Rangers) battalions of the Sherwood Foresters on 18 August 1915 at Brocklesby in Lincolnshire to form the 19th (Reserve) Battalion as a Local Reserve to provide reinforcements for the three pals battalions. The 19th Battalion moved to Ripon in North Yorkshire and joined 19th Reserve Brigade. In January 1916 it was at Harrogate and in July at Durham. On 1 September 1916 the Local Reserve battalions were transferred to the Training Reserve (TR) and the battalion was absorbed into other battalions of 19th (Reserve) Bde.

== Service ==
Mobilisation orders were received on 18 February 1916, and after some delays 16th Sherwoods left Witley Camp on 6 March for Southampton Docks to embark for France. It landed at Le Havre next day, and then went by train to 117th Bde's concentration area at Steenbecque in the First Army area. After further training 117th Brigade was attached to the experienced 8th Division for its introduction to Trench warfare, with 16th Sherwoods going to 23rd Bde at Estaires. A and B Companies were attached to the 2nd Bn West Yorkshire Regiment in the trenches near Laventie on 19 March and suffered their first few casualties. On 22 March they returned to Estaires and C and D Companies went into the trenches with 2nd Bn Scottish Rifles. While the battalion was at Estaires 35 men (probably ex-miners) transferred to 181st Tunnelling Company, Royal Engineers (RE). On completion of this attachment on 27 March the battalion marched to billets at Béthune, where it came under 33rd Division for further training. A and B Companies went into the trenches at Annequin South on 29 March with 20th Royal Fusiliers (1st Public Schools) of 19th Bde, and next day C and D went to Auchy. On 1 April 16 Sherwoods took over full responsibility for the trenches in the Auchy Right sector under 19th Bde. It suffered a number of casualties during this first tour of duty, after which it marched to rest billets at Busnettes near Gonnehem on 6 April. The battalion received a good report from the commander of 19th Bde, who described the men as 'a very tough lot'. 39th Division now took over its own sector at Festubert, and 16th Sherwoods moved to billets at Riez de Vinage. The battalion received a draft of 45 men from 19th (R) Bn, but also had to transfer one officer and 35 other ranks (ORs) to help form 117th Brigade Machine Gun (MG) Company. Officers and men were also detached to117th Brigade Trench Mortar Battery (TMB). The battalion moved into the trenches at Festubert on 23 April.

16th Sherwoods now began a routine of spells in the line at Festubert and Givenchy, alternating with spells in support or in billets, when working parties were constantly required. The battalion usually rotated with 17th KRRC. There was a trickle of casualties both in the line and among working parties from shellfire and occasional bombing exchanges with the enemy. The defences at Festubert comprised a series of 'islands' in the waterlogged countryside, and one of C Company's first tasks was to link up Islands 21 and 22. As soon as the battalion went into billets it had to find a working party of 350 men for the REs. This routine continued until 4 June when the battalion carried out its first trench raid on the German positions south of the 'Duck's Bill' near Givenchy. A party of 4 officers and 70 ORs went out at night, suffering a few casualties before they got through the barbed wire, then bombed their way right and left along the trenches. Most of the trench garrison were sheltering in their dugouts, which were bombed. The party withdrew after about 30 minutes. The casualties were 2 ORs killed and 5 missing, 1 officer and 18 ORs wounded, almost all in the early part of the raid. The battalion carried out regular patrols, which were unable to get far because the ground was marshy but one reconnaissance on 18/19 June was praised by the divisional commander. During the month 16th Sherwoods received reinforcement drafts from 19th (R) and 11th (S) Bns. On 15/16 June the battalion began an unusually long tour of duty in the Ferme du Bois trenches. On 30 June 39th Division's 116th Bde attacked the 'Boar's Head' and 16th Sherwoods provided a smoke barrage using 'P Bombs' (phosphorus grenades), receiving retaliatory artillery fire that caused considerable damage to the parapet. Nightly fighting patrols and snipers during the day regularly attacked the enemy's working parties and observation posts, and on the morning of 12 July the battalion raided the trench opposite under cover of a mortar barrage. One party succeeded in getting into the trench and caused damage and casualties, though the officer leading it was wounded and posted as missing along with 30 other casualties. After 35 continuous days in the Ferme du Bois trenches 16th Sherwoods was relieved on 20 July, having suffered 2 officers and 14 ORs killed, 4 officers and 85 ORs wounded during tour. After a rest at Gorre, the battalion returned to the Givenchy trenches on 1–5 August before going back to billets at Béthune.

=== Ancre ===
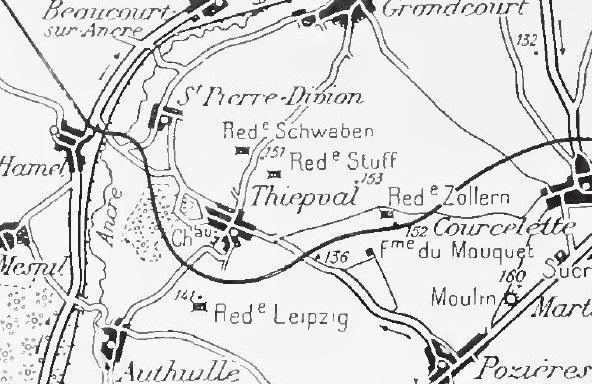
The Ancre Heights in 1916.

The Somme Offensive had been going on since 1 July, and on 11 August 39th Division was ordered south to join in. First 117th Bde went to La Thieuloye for brigade training, then on 23 August it began the march south, reaching Beaussart at the end of the month, where 39th Division awaited orders from Reserve Army to go up to the front. Reserve Army began a series of minor operations along the River Ancre in early September. On 3 September 39th Division was ordered to secure a few hundred yards of high ground north-west of St Pierre-Divion, to cover the flank of 49th (West Riding) Division advancing up the river valley. 117th Brigade attacked at 05.10 with 17th Sherwoods and 16th RB leading, 17th KRRC in support. 16th Sherwoods was in reserve, chiefly employed as carrying parties for the two attacking battalions. The battalion also provided 'trench control posts' and carrying parties to supply the forward dumps. The leading waves of 117th Bde had set off behind the Creeping barrage in good order. Unfortunately, the barrage had little effect on the enemy, and as soon as it lifted off the first line they manned the parapet and threw grenades as the first wave attackers closed in. 17th Sherwoods were held up by machine gun fire from the flank and 16th RB lost direction in the mist and smoke, and few entered the enemy trenches. Some of the second wave got over and even entered the second line of trenches but were met by intense machine gun and shell fire. The third wave got no further than the German front line. Several of 16th Sherwoods' carrying parties reached the German lines, and some made several journeys across No man's land under a heavy hostile artillery barrage. But by 05.40 the attack had clearly failed and most of the surviving attackers retired to their own trenches. The remaining small parties in the German front trench were bombed out. 16th RB launched a second small attack at 11.05 which briefly entered the trench before being ejected. 49th (WR) Division's attack had also failed, so at 11.50 39th Division called off any further attacks. Although not as heavy as those of the three assaulting battalions, 16th Sherwoods' casualties were considerable: 1 officer and 12 ORs killed or died of wounds, 4 officers and 78 ORs wounded, and 6 missing. After spending the night in Mailly Wood, the battalion returned to Beaussart, where it received a draft of 44 reinforcements.

=== Schwaben Redoubt ===
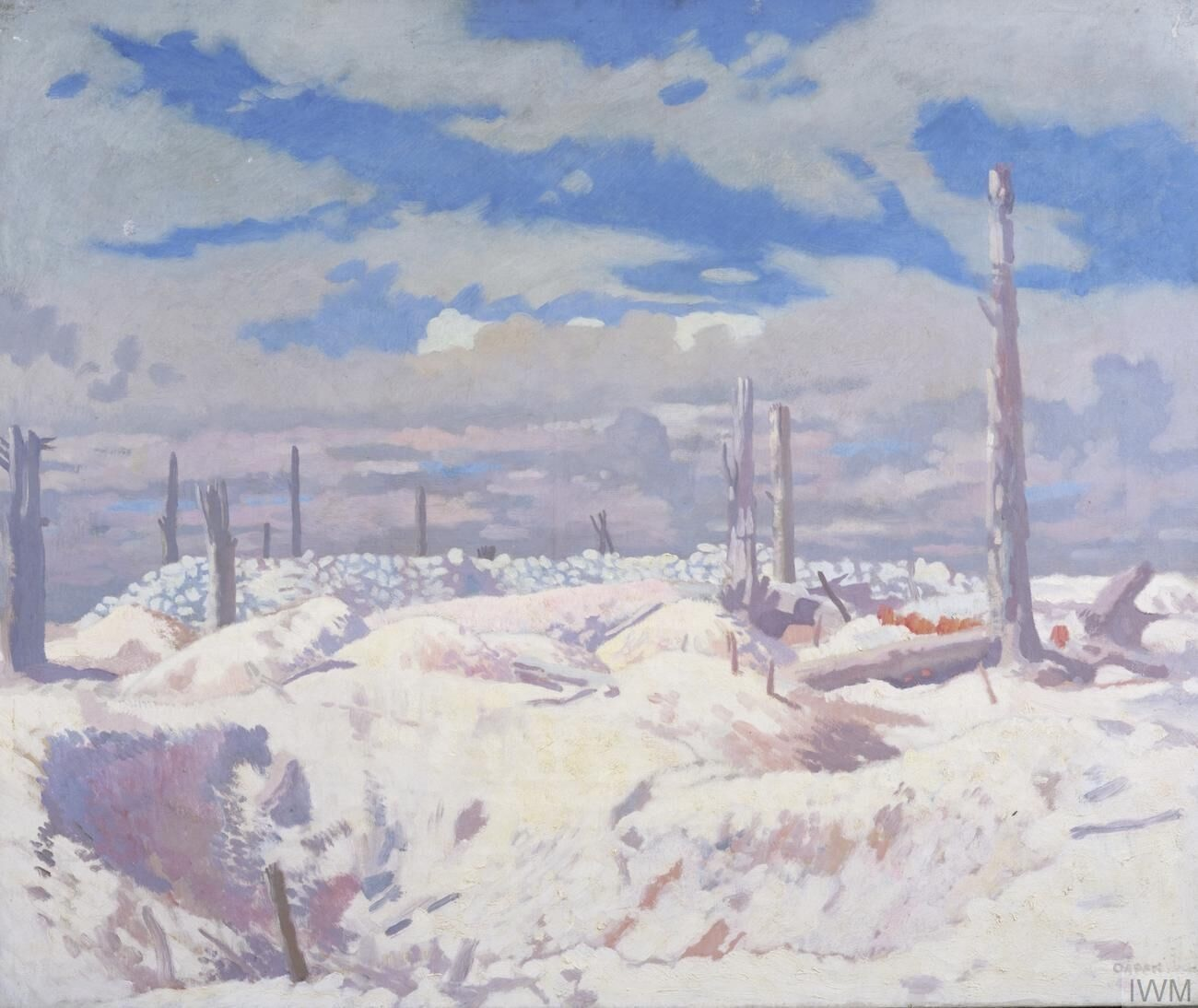
Schwaben Redoubt by William Orpen.

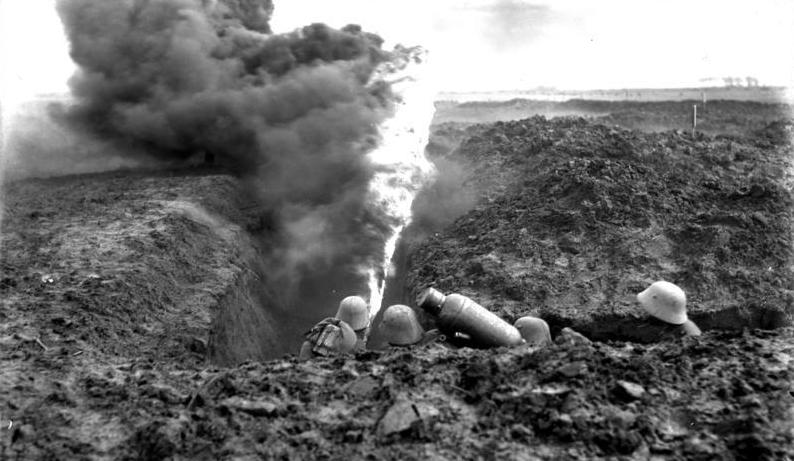
German flamethrower troops in training.

Two days later the battalion was back in the front line in the 'Long Acre' sector in front of Beaumont-Hamel, where it was joined by a further draft of 160 reinforcements. It exchanged with 17th Sherwoods in billets in Mailly Wood on 13/14 September, and then went into the trenches at Hébuterne on 20/21 September. At the beginning of October the battalion moved to Martinsart Wood, and when 39th Division entered the Battle of the Ancre Heights on 5 October 16th Sherwoods took over the duty of holding the southern face of the much fought-over 'Schwaben Redoubt'. The relief was carried out in daylight and the battalion came in for heavy shelling, losing 1 killed, 1 missing and 26 wounded. Battalion HQ was established in the ruins of Thiepval Chateau. On the evening of 7 October and the following morning the Germans made determined efforts to retake the Schwaben Redoubt, attacking with flammenwerfers (flamethrowers) and heavily shelling Thiepval, but were driven off by 16th and 17th Sherwoods, leaving behind 25 prisoners. The two battalions were congratulated by the brigadier and the corps commander. At 04.30 on 9 October, before dawn, 16th Sherwoods attempted a surprise attack without artillery preparation over the crest of the ridge against the northern face of the redoubt. As the trenches were full of mud the battalion advanced over the open. However, the Germans were 'standing to' and met the attack with rifle and machine gun fire; although B Company attacking on the right with a platoon of 17th Sherwoods entered the trench at 'Point 99' it had to withdraw after two hours when it ran out of bombs. The battalion lost 4 officers and 26 ORs killed or died of wounds, 7 officers and 134 wounded, 2 officers, 2 Company Sergeant-Majors and 62 ORs missing. The shattered battalion was relieved by 17th KRRC that afternoon, and went into billets at Senlis next day. On 14 October 118th Bde and 17th KRRC succeeded in completing the capture of the Schwaben Redoubt, with 16th Sherwoods providing 100 additional stretcher-bearers. The battalion returned to the front line on 16 October, but when 116th Bde captured 'Stuff Trench' on 21 October, 16th Sherwoods was not involved in the subsidiary attack carried out by 117th Bde. On 27 October the battalion went into brigade support at Thiepval and two days later went back to billets in Martinsart Wood. Over the following days it received reinforcement drafts totalling 88 men.

Reserve Army (now renamed Fifth Army) launched a new offensive (the Battle of the Ancre) on 13 November. At 05.45 118th Bde was to attack up the Ancre against St Pierre-Divion, which had thwarted 39th Division in September. Then at 06.15 three companies of 16th Sherwoods supported by a tank were to carry out a subsidiary attack alongside. The assembly was carried out without any problems and the divisional attack went in through a thick mist. The battalion assigned to capture St Pierre-Divion lost direction and did not reach it. Starting 30 minutes later, 16th Sherwoods' attack up the river valley seems to have taken the enemy by surprise. Preceded by a special barrage provided by LXXXV Brigade, Royal Field Artillery (12 x 18-pounder guns) the battalion reached the enemy first line trench before it met any opposition. Beyond the first trench the battalion was held up on the right, so at 06.30 the reserve company was sent to reinforce that part of the attack. The tank had already gone ahead, but it fell into a collapsed dugout in the second line and came under attack; the crew was rescued by the Sherwoods. 16th Sherwoods had reached its assigned objective but the men carried on with elements of 118th Bde, rushing St Pierre-Divion itself, including the German battalion HQ and the tunnel dugouts. A party then advanced on the right of 118th Bde to attack the 'Hansa Line' beyond, bombing the dugouts until they ran out of bombs, then securing the exits and prisoners until a company of 17th Sherwoods came up from reserve to assist. 16th Sherwoods' 56-year-old Sergeant-Cook C.H. Monks entered a defended dugout single-handed and came out with 6 prisoners. In total 13 German officers, including the battalion commander, and 720 ORs were taken prisoner, many having been driven down into the village by 118th Bde's advance on the higher ground. A section of 225th Field Company, RE, checked the dugouts for mines, but none were found. The battalion's casualties were remarkably low: 1 officer and 4 ORs killed, 67 ORs wounded. For his actions on 13 November Lt-Col Herbert-Stepney was awarded an 'immediate' DSO (one with a citation for gallantry) and a Mention in Dispatches in the 1917 New Year Honours. A number of other medals were awarded to officers and men of the battalion for that day. 39th Division was relieved the following day and began a journey north by road and rail to join Second Army, where 16th Sherwoods went into rest billets in Volckerinckhove.

=== Winter 1916–17 ===
Leave was granted to many personnel, and when Lt-Col Herbert-Stepney took over temporary command of 117th Bde later in November, Capt S.F. Lilley assumed command of the battalion until the second-in-command, Maj Noel Houghton, returned at the beginning of December. On 11 December 39th Division entrained for the Ypres Salient, where 16th Sherwoods began alternating with 17th KRRC and 17th Sherwoods in the Right Sub-section trenches. The battalion received a Christmas message from the Duke of Devonshire (now Governor General of Canada) and gift boxes from the people of Derbyshire. The battalion also received some reinforcement drafts. On 13 February 16th Sherwoods provided flank support for a large raid by 16th RB, the flanking party penetrating into an enemy sap without meeting any opposition. From 14 February to June 1917 Maj Houghton temporarily commanded 17th Sherwoods after their CO was wounded in the trenches. Later in February 16th Sherwoods went to 'E Camp' for training, particularly for the recently arrived reinforcements. It then went into trenches in the Zillebeke sector, alternating with support in Ypres Barracks and reserve at 'Toronto Camp' or 'Winnipeg Camp'. After a five-day tour in the Sanctuary Wood trenches in early April, where it was heavily bombarded, the battalion went by rail to the Merckeghem training area, where it learned the new platoon offensive tactics. After spending a period behind the lines at Brandhoek 16th Sherwoods went into the Canal Bank sector near Ypres on 16 May, where it supplied large working parties to dig a new assembly trench ('Bellingham Trench') north of Hill Top Farm. This work was done in conjunction with 225th Field Co, RE, and the divisional pioneers, 19th Gloucestershire Regiment under the command of Lt-Col Herbert-Stepney, and attracted a heavy enemy bombardment, luckily with few casualties. On 27 and 28 May, while the battalion was holding the Hill Top trenches, the enemy carried out a heavy Minenwerfer bombardment that breached the parapets, then raided the battalion, taking a prisoner. In June the battalion was in the Hill Top and Wieltje sectors, suffering numerous casualties from enemy shelling. The routine of trench duty and working parties continued until 1 July, when the battalion went by rail to the Serques area where 39th Division underwent special training over model trenches for the forthcoming Ypres Offensive. Emphasis was given to methods for overcoming the new concrete 'pillboxes' the Germans were constructing. 16th Sherwoods returned to the front line at Hill Top and Canal Bank on 28 July.

=== Pilckem Ridge ===
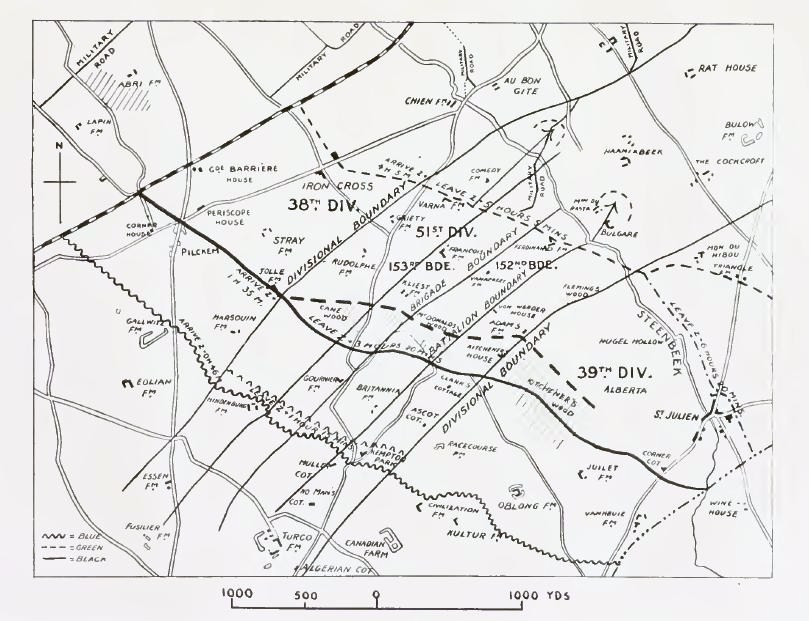
The northern part of the Battle of Pilckem Ridge, 31 July 1917.

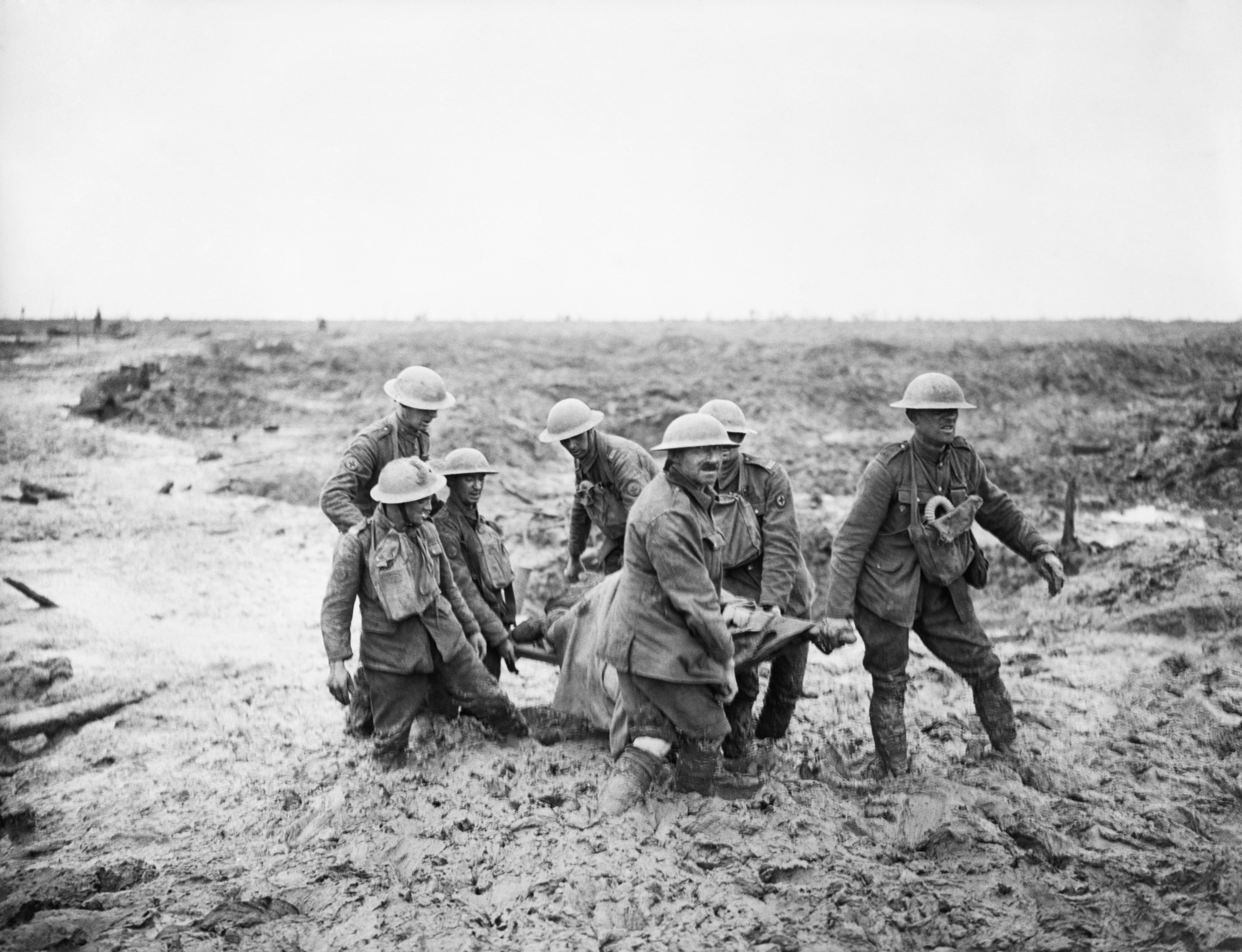
Stretcher-bearers struggle through the mud after the Battle of Pilckem Ridge, 1 August 1917 (Photograph by John Warwick Brooke).

The Ypres offensive opened with the Battle of Pilckem Ridge on 31 July 1917 after 12 days' bombardment of the German positions. 16th Sherwoods on 117th Bde's right was to attack on a two-company front, with A (right) and B (left) Companies capturing and consolidating the German front (Red) and support (Yellow) lines, then for C (right) and D (left) Companies to pass through and take the German reserve (Blue and Dotted Blue) line, the whole being referred to as the 'German Front Line System' constituting the division's first objective for the day. The battalion completed its assembly in 'Hornby' and 'Forward' trenches at Zero minus 3 hours, when it was already raining. At Zero minus 5 minutes 500 oil drums were projected onto the German front line by mortars (the resulting fires helped the attackers keep direction), and at Zero (03.50, about half an hour before dawn) the British barrage of artillery and machine gun fire came down and the assault troops moved out into No man's land. At Zero plus six minutes the barrage lifted off the enemy front line and began creeping forward at 100 yards (91 m) every 4 minutes, while the first wave of attackers went in. They met little resistance in the German front and support trenches, which were only lightly held. A section of 117th Bde TMB accompanied the second wave to take up positions with its mortars in the German front line and support the advance to the Blue Line. This also was taken without much difficulty, a section of 117th Bde MG Co accompanying the fourth wave to defend the Blue Line. 16th Sherwoods had captured 120 prisoners and two machine guns. The battalion settled down to consolidate the Dotted Blue Line while 17th Sherwoods and 16th RB with some tanks passed through to capture 'Kitchener's Wood' and the German defences up to the Steenbeek stream (the Black Line). By 08.00 A Company of 16th Sherwoods had been withdrawn to work under 227th Field Co, RE, on road construction, and for the remainder of the day the rest of the battalion was employed carrying wire, small arms ammunition, bombs and water up to the brigade dump and forward to 17th Sherwoods and 16th RB. 118th Brigade passed through at 10.30 to attack the division's final set of objectives, but at this point the plan began to break down. 118th Brigade fell back before counter-attacks, although protective barrages stopped the Germans about 300 yards (270 m) in front of the Steenbeek, which became the British front line. At 16.30 C Company of 16th Sherwoods was sent up to reinforce 17th Sherwoods, one platoon of which went forward to the outposts along the Steenbeek. At 21.00 B Company was also sent up to reinforce the new front line. Under incessant rain, the Steenbeek valley became a morass, and simply maintaining positions was an ordeal. 117th Brigade was supposed to have been relieved on the night of 31 July/1 August, but 118th Bde had been much harder hit, and 117th remained in position. The following night the brigade took over the whole divisional frontage, with 16th Sherwoods taking the line from St Julien to Venheulle Farm. During the relief a German high-velocity shell entered the farm, killing and wounding 3 officers and 30 ORs of the battalion. On 3 August A and B Companies were heavily shelled and suffered serious casualties, having to withdraw from their flooded dugouts to 'Camphor Trench' and 'California Drive'. The steady bombardment continued over the following days, making it difficult to bring up supplies. Patrols from D Company drove enemy patrols away from St Julien and reported the village clear of the enemy. The battalion was finally relieved on the evening of 5 August and went back to the dugouts at Canal Bank.

On 7 August the battalion was withdrawn by rail to a camp at Caëstre to reorganise and train. It went up by motor buses on 13 August to a forward camp at "Ridge Wood" and next day went into the front line in the Klein Zillebeke sector. Battalion HQ was in "Railway cutting", part of the Ypres–Comines railway, underneath the spoil heap known as "Hill 60"; D Company was positioned astride the "Caterpillar", another elongated spoil heap. On the morning of 15 August D Company was raided out of the morning mist by an enemy force preceded by a barrage of rifle grenades and light trench mortars. The company was already "standing to", and as the Germans crossed the hedge in front they were met by steady rifle and Lewis gun fire from No 16 Platoon. The platoon commander and his orderly went out along a sap and bombed the raiders with German grenades that had been left in a captured dugout, while a sniping post on top of company HQ accounted for others. The raiders had 20–25 killed and left 13 prisoners behind. 16th Sherwoods' casualties had been 1 officer and 1 OR wounded, but later in the day Lt-Col Herbert-Stepney was wounded in the arm and side by a sniper while he was on his way to D Company to pass on the Army Commander's congratulations. His arm was amputated and Maj Houghton was promoted to succeed him in command from 16 August. (Lieutenant-Col Herbert-Stepney was awarded a Bar to his DSO in the 1918 New Year Honours and resigned from the army on account of his wounds on 19 October 1918.)

The battalion played no part in the Battle of Langemarck (16–18 August) and instead was relieved on 17 August and went into support, where it dug a new support trench at Klein Zillebeke. On 20 August it went back to Ridge Wood Camp, working for 227th Field Co, RE. After a four-day spell in the line at Hollebeke it went back to Ontario Camp to rest and absorb reinforcements. On 4 September it marched to Steenvoorde to begin training for the next operation, the Battle of the Menin Road Ridge. It went up by bus to Ridge Wood on 12 September, where it was heavily shelled. On 13 September Lt-Col Houghton was killed by a shell near Battalion HQ. He was buried in La Clytte Military Cemetery. Major John Webster was sent from 17th Sherwoods to take over command.

=== Menin Road ===
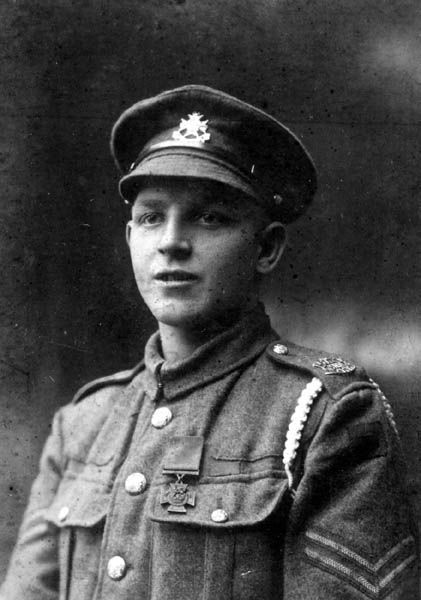
Corporal Ernest Egerton, who won the VC attacking machine gun positions.

The battalion went back to 'Bivouac Camp' on 15 September to prepare for the Menin Road attack, which was scheduled for 20 September. On 18 September it went up to trenches at Zwarteleen near Hill 60, leaving 120 'details' at the divisional reinforcement camp, together with newly arrived drafts of 92 men. The fighting strength of the battalion completed its assembly on the night of 19/20 September about 2 hours before Zero, suffering a few casualties from sporadic shelling. The plan was for 117th Bde to advance through 'Shrewsbury Forest' against the German lines and form part of a defensive flank for the rest of the attack. It was to be led by 17th Sherwoods (right) and 16th RB (left) to capture the Red Line, then 16th Sherwoods and 17th KRRC would pass through to take the Blue Line. Screened by a very heavy barrage advancing by 50 yards (46 m) every 2 minutes, the assaulting troops jumped off at Zero. The enemy counter-barrage came down quickly, 20 men of 16th Sherwoods including a complete Lewis gun team being hit about 30 seconds after Zero. In order to get away from this fire the companies pushed forwards, getting mixed up with the 17th Sherwoods ahead. The division to the left got held up, and fire from that flank caused heavy casualties to the two left-hand battalions (16th RB and 17th KRRC), but the two battalions of Sherwoods advanced steadily over soft ground. In the mist 16th Sherwoods' centre and left companies bore too far left, but this was quickly corrected, and the mist meant that the enemy fire was inaccurate. However, some enemy machine gun positions were passed in the mist by the leading waves and began to inflict casualties. The commander of the support company went forward to find them, and when he called for volunteers Corporal Ernest Egerton dashed forward to these dugouts and shot 3 Germans at close range, after which 29 more surrendered to him. He was awarded the Victoria Cross (VC) for this action. The leading waves of the battalion were now advancing steadily through 'Bulgar Wood', close behind the barrage towards the Blue Line. Seeing that the right hand company of 17th KRRC was held up by enemy troops sheltering in a trench and shell holes, 16th Sherwoods' left company detached two Lewis gun teams to the left edge of the wood to bring enfilade fire against them. The Germans ducked down, but were driven out with rifle grenades, and were then shot down by the Lewis guns as they ran. The left flank company was then able to advance rapidly to the Blue Line, rounding up prisoners from shell holes. Centre company used rifle grenades to deal with a large concrete pillbox just beyond the Blue Line, in which they captured 30 prisoners. This was then manned by Lewis gun teams, who had an excellent field of fire along the Basseville Beek stream. Another 24 prisoners were taken from a pillbox on the Blue Line known as 'Chatsworth Castle'. The battalion then settled to consolidate the line and drive off remaining enemy with rifle and Lewis gun fire. At 17.30 and again at 18.55 the enemy were seen to be concentrating for counter-attacks, but each time were dispersed by the Lewis guns and supporting artillery. At 09.45 the following morning several hundred of the enemy were seen massing on the 'Tower Hamlets' slope 1,350 yards (1,230 m) away inside the British barrage line. The battalion were unable to get the artillery redirected to this excellent target or to see the effect of their own long range rifle fire. Bulgar Wood was shelled all day, but the battalion was well dug in and suffered few casualties. The artillery was due to fire a practice SOS barrage in front of 117th Bde's line at 19.00 when a genuine SOS signal went up from 16th Sherwoods' neighbours at 18.59: the prepared barrage came down on Germans concentrating for a counter-attack, causing huge casualties. 16th Sherwoods took over 200 prisoners and 9 machine guns. The battalion was relieved that evening and went by bus to 'Curragh Camp'. Its total casualties in the two-day battle were 2 officers and 36 ORs killed, 2 officers and 126 ORs wounded, and 24 missing. 39th Division attacked again on 26 September (the Battle of Polygon Wood) but 117th Bde was in divisional reserve in Ridge Wood and 16th Sherwoods was not engaged except for 63 men attached to 134th Field Ambulance as additional stretcher bearers. It then marched to 'Wakefield Huts' near Locre where it remained resting and training until 19 October. Three companies of 16th Sherwoods went into the line near Tower Hamlets, with A Company used for carrying parties up to the front line. It was relieved on 24/25 October and then went to Godazonne Farm Camp near 'Confusion Corner' until it moved up to the Polderhoek sector on 7 November and was accommodated in 'Canada Tunnels'. It therefore took no part in the Second Battle of Passchendaele that ended the Ypres offensive.

=== Winter 1917–18 ===
For most of November the battalion alternated between the front line at 'Bodmin Copse' near Polderhoek and 'Chippewa Camp' in the rear. Bodmin Copse was bombarded with gas shells, causing numerous casualties on top of the normal casualties suffered in the trenches. 16th Sherwoods went back to billets at Abeele on 24 November for rest and training. It did not return to the line until 30 December, when it went into support in the Alberta sector in the Steenbeek valley. It then alternated between there and 'Dambre Camp' or 'Road Camp' until 24 January when it went by train to the Somme, where 39th Division joined Fifth Army. 16th Sherwoods was billeted at Suzanne.

Because of the severe manpower shortage being suffered by the BEF by early 1918, infantry brigades were reduced to three battalions and the surplus war-formed battalions disbanded to provide reinforcements to the others. In 117th Bde the plan had been to disband 16th Sherwoods, but in the event 17th Sherwoods were chosen instead: 9 officers and 200 ORs were drafted to 16th Sherwoods on 8 February. 16th Sherwoods' A Company was disbanded and replaced by one formed from 17th Sherwoods, the remaining men being distributed among the other companies.

=== Spring offensive ===
The long-anticipated German spring offensive began on 21 March. At the time 39th Division was out of the line in GHQ Reserve, where 16th Sherwoods had been in Dessart Wood Camp since 1 March, but its huts came under heavy shellfire (high explosive and gas) when the bombardment began at 04.30. The battalion left the camp at 07.00 and marched up to Sorrell Wood in a dense fog, heavy with gas, and suffered 23 gas casualties on the way. In the evening, having waited in reserve all day, 117th Bde moved to a position south-east of Saulcourt to dig in along the 'Saulcourt Switch Line' between the Battle Zone and the 'Green Line' (the rearmost defence line) to protect the exposed right flank of 21st Division. Next day (22 March) troops were seen falling back all along the front, and at 14.30 the enemy came into contact with 16th Sherwoods in the Saulcourt Switch. The battalion was machine-gunned by a German aircraft and the battalions on both flanks were heavily attacked at 15.00. By 18.30 they had given way, and 16th Sherwoods was in danger of becoming isolated. It was ordered to retire by platoons to Bois be Beurre, with A and C Companies fighting a rearguard action; this was completed by 20.00. Lieutenant-Col Webster was reported wounded and believed taken prisoner. In fact he died of his wounds. His body was never recovered and he is commemorated on the Pozières Memorial. Captain L.J.B. Harrison assumed command of the battalion, the second-in-command, Maj H.R. Stevens, having been sent to the rear with the HQ details the day before.

At 23.00 that night the battalion moved to support 17th KRRC and 16th RB, who were holding the Green Line in Tincourt Wood. The following morning (23 March) dawn broke with a heavy mist through which the enemy attacked in great numbers. Fierce fighting broke out along the whole brigade frontage, but the enemy had actually fallen back when orders arrived for the battalions to withdraw. The whole of 39th Division was being forced to retreat by the collapse of 21st Division's position. At 08.00 16th Sherwoods were ordered back to take up a line from Beune to Nurlu-Peronne. However, the enemy attack was becoming very heavy all along the front, and 39th Division was again ordered to retire, with 16th Sherwoods withdrawing under heavy pressure to a position near Mont Saint-Quentin. Major Stevens came up from the details and took command of the battalion. By now the roads were clogged with retreating transport (cross-country movement over the old Somme battlefield being almost impossible for vehicles) and the Cléry-sur-Somme road was under shellfire, the vehicles being diverted onto a railway track. The brigade made a stand on the Mont St Quentin ridge and then on the Cléry road to allow the transport to get away. By now 16th Sherwoods was nearly surrounded and fell back fighting to Cléry. Here the brigade reorganised at 17.00 to cover the Somme crossings. 16th Sherwoods along with small parties from various other units formed a defensive flank. With the enemy lapping round its flank, 117th Bde crossed the Somme Canal by the wooden bridge at Cléry under shellfire and air attack before it was blown up by the engineers. The depleted battalions of 117th Bde then went into reserve to get some hot food and a night's rest.

At 07.00 next morning (24 March) 117th Bde took up a position on the canal bank at Feuillères. The Actions at the Somme Crossings began that morning: fighting took place at Cléry, but no attacks were made on 117th Bde, though Maj Stevens was wounded. On 25 March the brigade saw large numbers of Germans moving along the north bank of the canal towards Curlu, and caused many casualties among them with rifle and Lewis gun fire. However, formations to the left had given way, and again 16th Sherwoods had to withdraw before it was surrounded, going back to a line of trenches at Herbécourt. At dawn on 26 March the Germans launched a heavy attack (the Battle of Rosières) capturing Herbécourt and forcing another withdrawal. By 17.00 117th Bde had established a strong line in front of Proyart, where it was heavily shelled during the night. The German attack was renewed at daybreak on 27 March, making no progress against 39th Division and suffering huge casualties from rifle and Lewis gun fire. However the enemy got through between Proyart and the Somme, forcing 117th Bde to form a defensive flank, 16th Sherwoods falling back fighting stubbornly until it reached the high ground at Morcourt. Later the enemy could be seen similarly digging in on a ridge outside Proyart, about 1,000 yards (910 m) away. During the night it was learned that the enemy had crossed the Somme elsewhere and was now in the battalion's rear. 16th Sherwoods was ordered back to Cayeux, where it took up position in a wood. Captain Harrison had been killed during the day. During 28 March the battalion repulsed an attack, but owing to the enemy advance it was ordered back again to the high ground south of Aubercourt under heavy shelling. This continued throughout 29 March, but the battalion was not attacked. Next day it was withdrawn to Hangard Wood to rest; however shortly after arriving it was ordered to counter-attack the ridge north of the wood, causing the Germans to retire. The battalion then dug in under shell and machine gun fire. Twice attacks turned its flanks but 2nd Lieutenant G. Powell led the battalion in counter-attacks that regained the position, the men turning a captured machine gun on the retiring Germans. That night it was relieved by Australian troops and the survivors went into billets at Longueau; the 'Great Retreat' was over. 16th Sherwood's casualties had been very heavy, reported as 3 officers and 14 ORs killed or died of wounds, 12 officers and 179 ORs wounded, 4 officers and 104 ORs missing (of whom Lt-Col Webster was later ascertained to have died). Unusually for such a junior officer, 2nd Lt Powell was awarded the DSO.

=== 3rd Composite Battalion ===
The survivors of 117th Bde were taken by lorry to Bovelles, and then marched by stages and by train, arriving on 10 April in the Saint-Omer area where 39th Division was concentrating behind Second Army. The plan had been to use the much-reduced division to train divisions of the American Expeditionary Forces now arriving on the Western Front. However, Second Army had been depleted to send troops south to help stem the German offensive, and then on 9 April it was attacked itself (the Battle of the Lys). 39th Division was its only reserve – even though each brigade was now hardly stronger than a single battalion – and the division was ordered to organise a composite brigade from its units to go back into the line. '39th Composite Brigade' comprised four battalions, of which 117th Bde formed No 3 under Lt-Col the Hon E. Coke (16th RB), with two companies (6 officers and 392 ORs under Maj J.W.J. Miller) and the transport section provided by 16th Sherwoods, one and a half by 17th KRRC and half a company by 16th RB. No 3 Battalion went up to Ridge Wood Camp under 21st Division on 14 April, where it was shelled and suffered casualties. On 12 April a further 80 ORs of 16th Sherwoods were sent to form No 5 Composite Bn under Lt-Col C.H.N. Seymour (17th KRRC), of which two companies were supplied by 117th Bde. On 14 April this battalion went to Borre, near Hazebrouck, and was attached to 1st Australian Division.

The composite brigade fought in a number of actions with XXII Corps. On the evening 16 April the two Sherwood companies (A & B) of 3rd Bn counter-attacked from Wytschaete Wood. The objective was the ridge 1,000 yards (910 m) in front, and the attack made 800 yards (730 m) and captured a number of prisoners and machine guns, but at heavy cost: 19 ORs killed or died of wounds, 3 officers (including Maj Miller) and 74 ORs wounded, 8 ORs missing. On 18 April the battalion came under the orders of 9th (Scottish) Division and the two Sherwood companies were relieved by 1st South African Infantry Brigade, going back to billets at Scottish Wood Camp. However, they were shelled out of that camp that night and moved into dugouts in English Camp and later to Awapuni Lines, near Dickebusch. The two Sherwood companies returned to the Wytschaete line 19–20 April, suffering further casualties. From Awapuni Lines the battalion supplied working parties until 25 April when it was forced out of the camp by gas shelling and had to form a defensive flank towards the Vierstraat crossroads. The enemy broke through over the crossroads, and the KRRC/RB company took up a position from Ridge Wood to 'Confusion Corner', about 500 yards (460 m) north-east of Vierstraat, with the Sherwood Company echeloned behind. Next day the Sherwoods were withdrawn and sent back to the GHQ First Line at Voormezele where they came under the orders of No 1 Composite Bn. No 3 Composite Bn reassembled at a camp at Dominion Lines near Outerdom where it remained, although it was shelled out of the camp into an old trench line on 29 April. Casualties had been so heavy that Nos 2 and 3 Composite Bns were amalgamated into one. However, the crisis had passed.

=== Training cadre ===
While the Composite Brigade was detached, 39th Division had begun training troops of the 77th US Infantry Division in the Éperlecques area. Instructors from 16th Sherwoods were attached to 1st and 3rd Bns, 307th Infantry Regiment, and the battalion provided working parties to construct the training grounds. Major John Cassy assumed command of 16th Sherwoods on 14 April and was promoted to Lt-Col. On 6–7 May 2nd Lt Powell, 130 ORs and the transport section returned from No 3 Composite Bn. During May the infantry units of 39th Division were reduced to training cadres (TCs). A TC generally comprised 10 officers and 45 ORs; between 16 and 24 May the surplus transport and men (307 ORs) of 16th Sherwoods were sent to the base depot at Étaples to reinforce other units. The battalion also supplied 15 ORs to form the Rifle Grenade Section of the 39th Division Demonstration Platoon. A large number of TCs from other formations joined the division at this time.

In mid-May 1/307th and 3/307th US Battalions moved to the Third Army area, accompanied by their instructors, who returned to 16th Sherwoods on 25 May. At the end of the month 1st and 3rd Bns, 117th Infantry Regiment, of 30th US Division arrived at Mentque and Inginghem respectively and were affiliated to the TC of 16th Sherwoods for instruction. On 26 June 30th US Division was ordered at short notice to the Cassel area of the Winnezeele Line, accompanied by its instructors, who returned on19 July. On 15 August 117th Bde left 39th Division to join Lines of Communication, and next day the TC of 16th Sherwoods was transferred to 66th (2nd East Lancashire) Division, which was also composed of TCs. The Sherwoods were affiliated to 198th Bde, but when 66th Division began reforming for active service, the TCs were attached to its 197th Bde which transferred to Line of Communication duties on 20 September. Small groups of officers and men from a large number of different regiments recently returned from. the Salonika Front began to be attached to 16th Sherwoods' TC at Quesnes, apparently while recovering from malaria. On 24 October numbers of these men were drafted to units of 66th and 50th (Northumbrian) Divisions.

After the Armistice with Germany came into force on 11 November 16th Sherwoods' TC continued to administer details from other units. 39th Division was reorganised on 18 November, and 197th Bde joined it. At the beginning of December the Sherwoods took over the malarial personnel attached to other TCs in the brigade, and drafted large numbers to various battalions and base depots. A number of vitally-needed coalminers were also sent for early demobilisation. By 15 January 1919 the cadre consisted of 10 officers and 52 ORs when it was sent to Le Havre to form C Wing of the General Base Depot. Officers were progressively demobilised, including Lt-Col Cassy on 9 March, and others were posted to the 52nd and 53rd (Service) Bns of the Sherwood Foresters serving with British Army of the Rhine. Captain W.E. Wright commanded the remainder of the cadre until he joined 53rd Sherwoods, leaving Lt A.J. Davis to command the colour party to receive the King's Colour presented to 16th Sherwoods on 6 May for its war service. The battalion was officially disbanded in France on 19 June 1919.

== Insignia ==
The battalion wore the Sherwood Foresters' cap badge and the 'NOTTS AND DERBY' brass title on the shoulder straps. Units of 117th Bde also wore green flashes with a black symbol on both sleeves: in 16th Sherwoods this was a horizontal rectangle with a smaller black bar superimposed. The formation sign for 39th Division was a white square with three light blue vertical stripes.

== Memorials ==
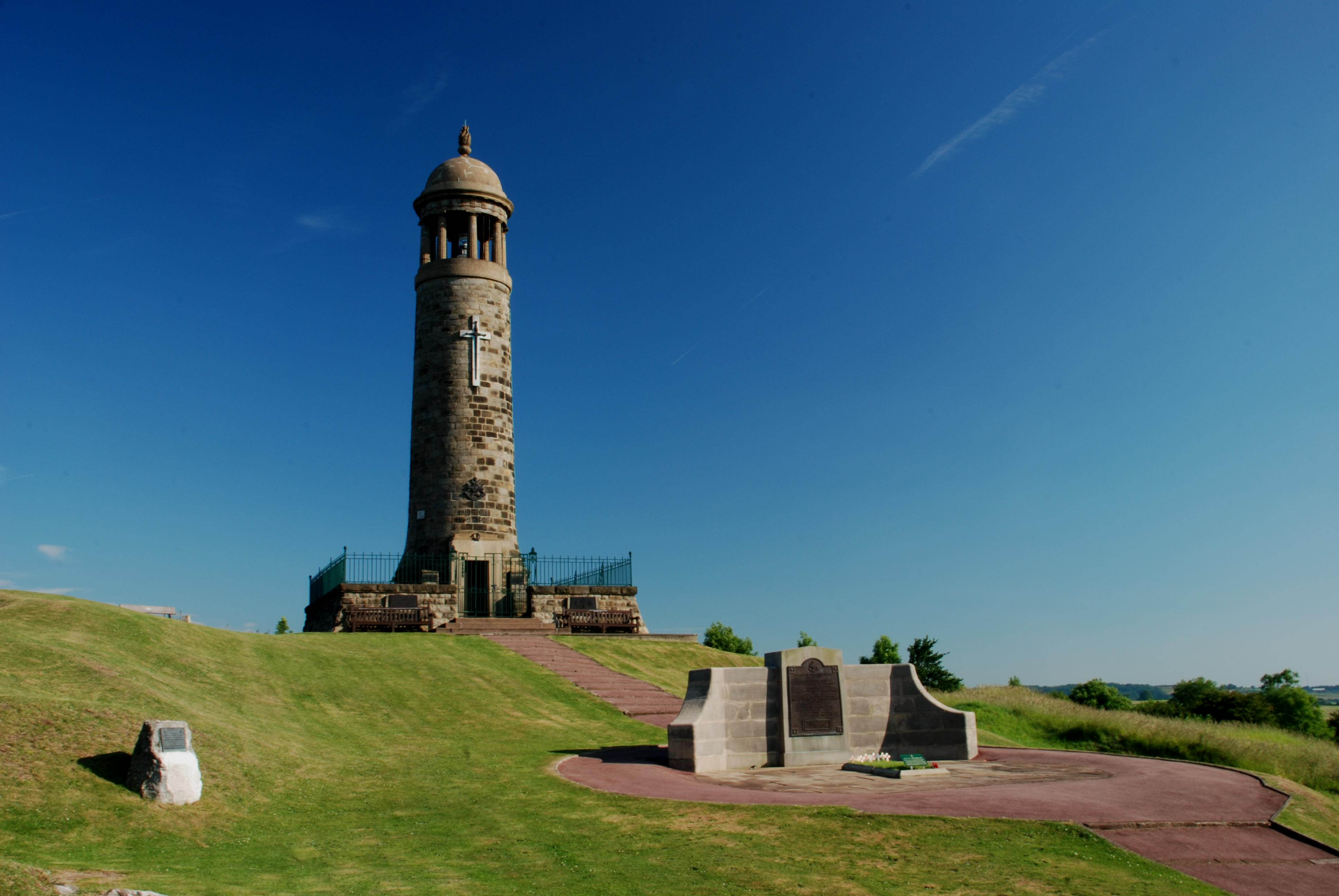
The Sherwood Foresters' memorial at Crich Stand

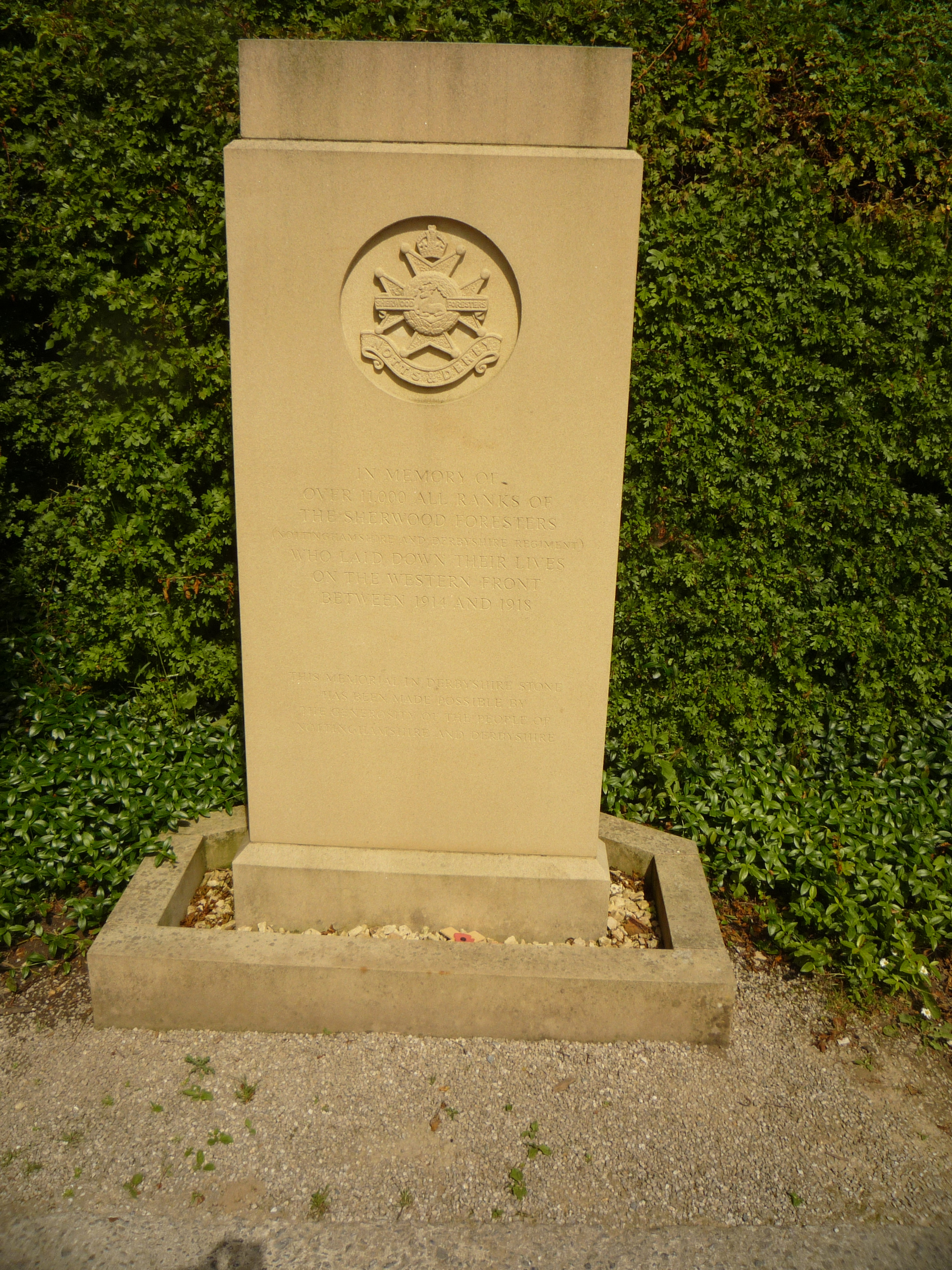
The Sherwood Foresters' memorial at Tyne Cot

The Sherwood Foresters' regimental war memorial, Crich Stand, consists of a tower topped by a lantern erected in 1923 on a hillside overlooking the village of Crich close to the Nottinghamshire–Derbyshire boundary. Bronze memorial plaques referring to the monument on Crich Hill were later placed in several towns and villages in the two counties.

A modern Derbyshire stone memorial to those of the Sherwood Foresters who died on the Western Front was erected behind the Commonwealth War Graves Commission's Tyne Cot Monument in 2009.

There is a book of remembrance to the 16th Sherwoods in St Peter's Church, Edensor, the Duke of Devonshire's family church close to Chatsworth House.
