= Mailly-Maillet =

- Commune
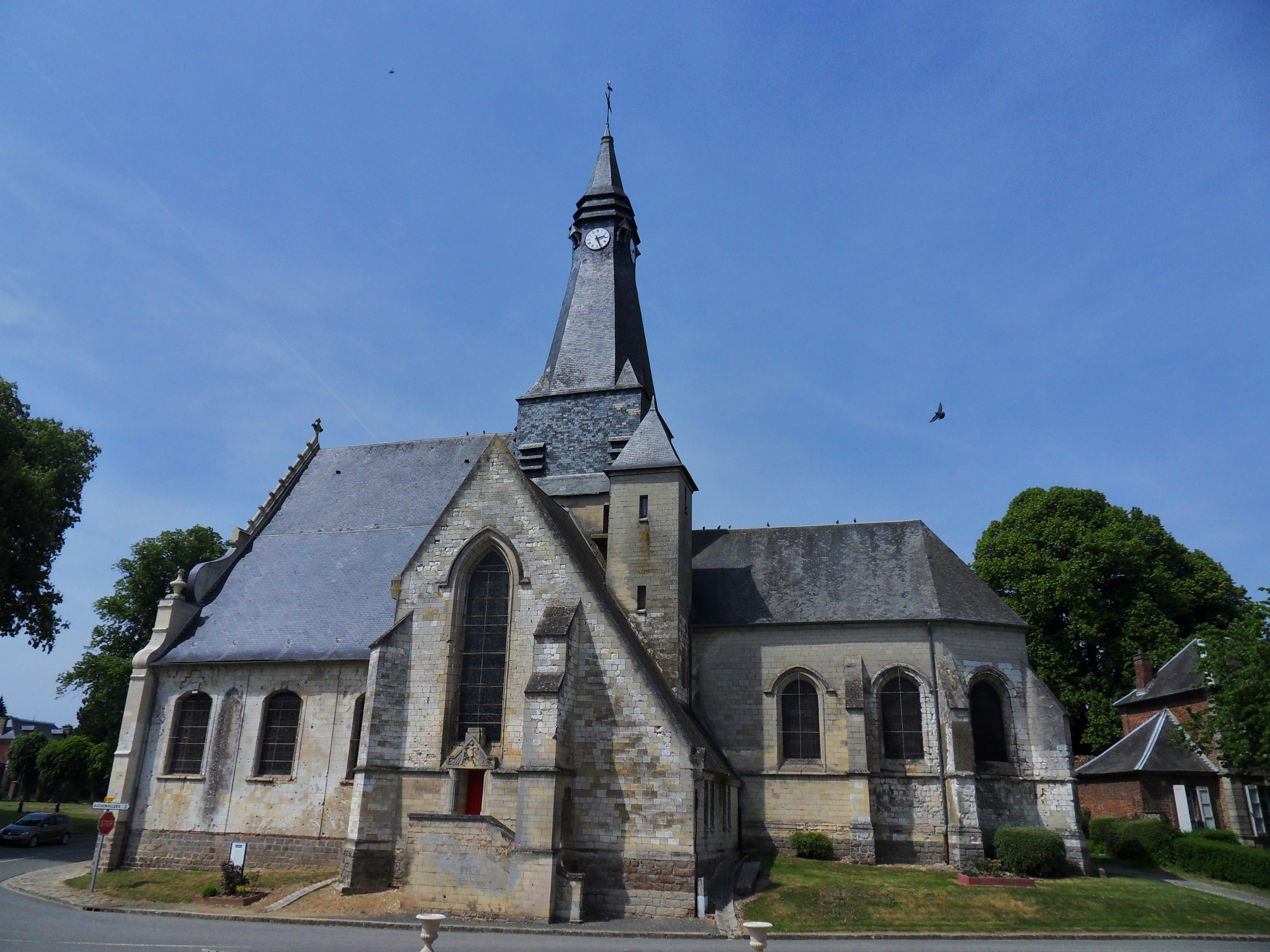
- The church in Mailly-Maillet

- Coat of arms
- Location of Mailly-Maillet
- Location within France Location within Hauts-de-France
- Coordinates: 50°04′01″N 2°36′00″E
- Country: France
- Region: Hauts-de-France
- Department: Somme
- Arrondissement: Péronne
- Canton: Albert
- Intercommunality: Pays du Coquelicot

Government
  - Mayor (2020–2026): Christelle Lefevre-Margage
- Area^{1}: 11.14 km^{2} (4.30 sq mi)
- Elevation: 156 m (512 ft)
- Highest elevation: 157 m (515 ft)
- Lowest elevation: 94 m (308 ft)
- Population (2023): 628
  - Density: 56.4/km^{2} (146/sq mi)
- Time zone: UTC+01:00 (CET)
  - Summer (DST): UTC+02:00 (CEST)
- INSEE/Postal code: 80498 /80560
- ^{1} French Land Register data, which excludes lakes, ponds, glaciers > 1 km^{2} (0.386 sq mi or 247 acres) and river estuaries.

Mailly-Maillet (French pronunciation: [maji majɛ]) is a commune in the Somme department in Hauts-de-France in northern France.

== Geography ==
The commune is situated on the D919 road, about 20 miles (32 km) northeast of Abbeville.

== History ==
It is close to the area of the Battle of the Somme. There are two military cemeteries which are maintained by the Commonwealth War Graves Commission:

- Mailly Wood

Mailly Wood Cemetery was designed by Reginald Blomfield.

- Mailly-Maillet Communal Cemetery Extension

The smaller of the two military cemeteries, this was designed by Wilfred Clement Von Berg.

== Population ==
Historical population
Year	Pop.	±% p.a.
1968	675	—
1975	657	−0.39%
1982	620	−0.82%
1990	639	+0.38%
1999	604	−0.62%
2007	602	−0.04%
2012	609	+0.23%
2017	624	+0.49%
2023	628	+0.11%
Source: INSEE

== See also ==
- Communes of the Somme department
