= Mailly Wood =

Cemetery located in Somme, France

Mailly Wood Military Cemetery
- Commonwealth War Graves Commission
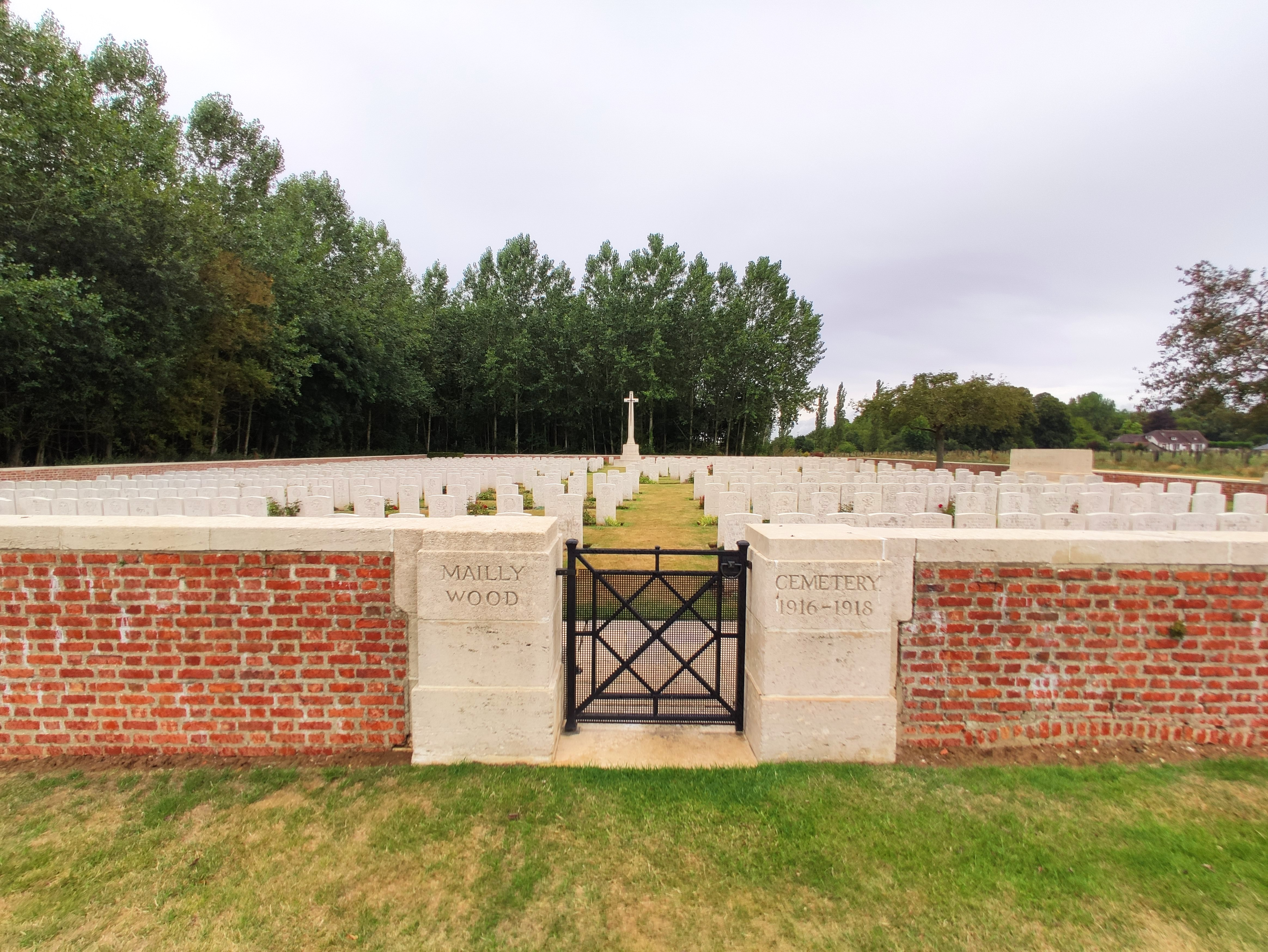
- Entrance with the Cross of Sacrifice on the far side of the enclosure
- Used for those deceased 1915-1918
- Established: 1916
- Location: 50.0748°N 2.5992°E
- Designed by: Sir Reginald Blomfield

Burials by nation
- Allied Powers

Burials by war
- World War I

Mailly Wood Cemetery (French: cimetière de Mailly Wood) is a military cemetery with casualties from the First World War, located in the French village of Mailly-Maillet (Somme). It is maintained by the Commonwealth War Graves Commission.

== Design ==
It was designed by the British architect Reginald Blomfield. The site covers an area of 2,099 m² and is surrounded by a brick wall covered by white capstones. There is a Cross of Sacrifice (a feature designed by Blomfield for cemeteries containing 40 or more graves). It stands centrally against the northwest wall. The Stone of Remembrance (designed by Lutyens) stands against the northeast wall.

== Memorials ==
Most of the burials are of British soldiers. There are also New Zealanders and South Africans. 60 of the burials are unidentified.

There is a Duhallow Block, a special memorial for those whose graves have been lost. It commemorates 6 soldiers whose graves were destroyed by shell fire.

=== Distinguished soldiers ===
- One Victoria Cross recipient is buried in the cemetery: he is Harold John Colley who was killed in 1918. He was also awarded the Military Medal.

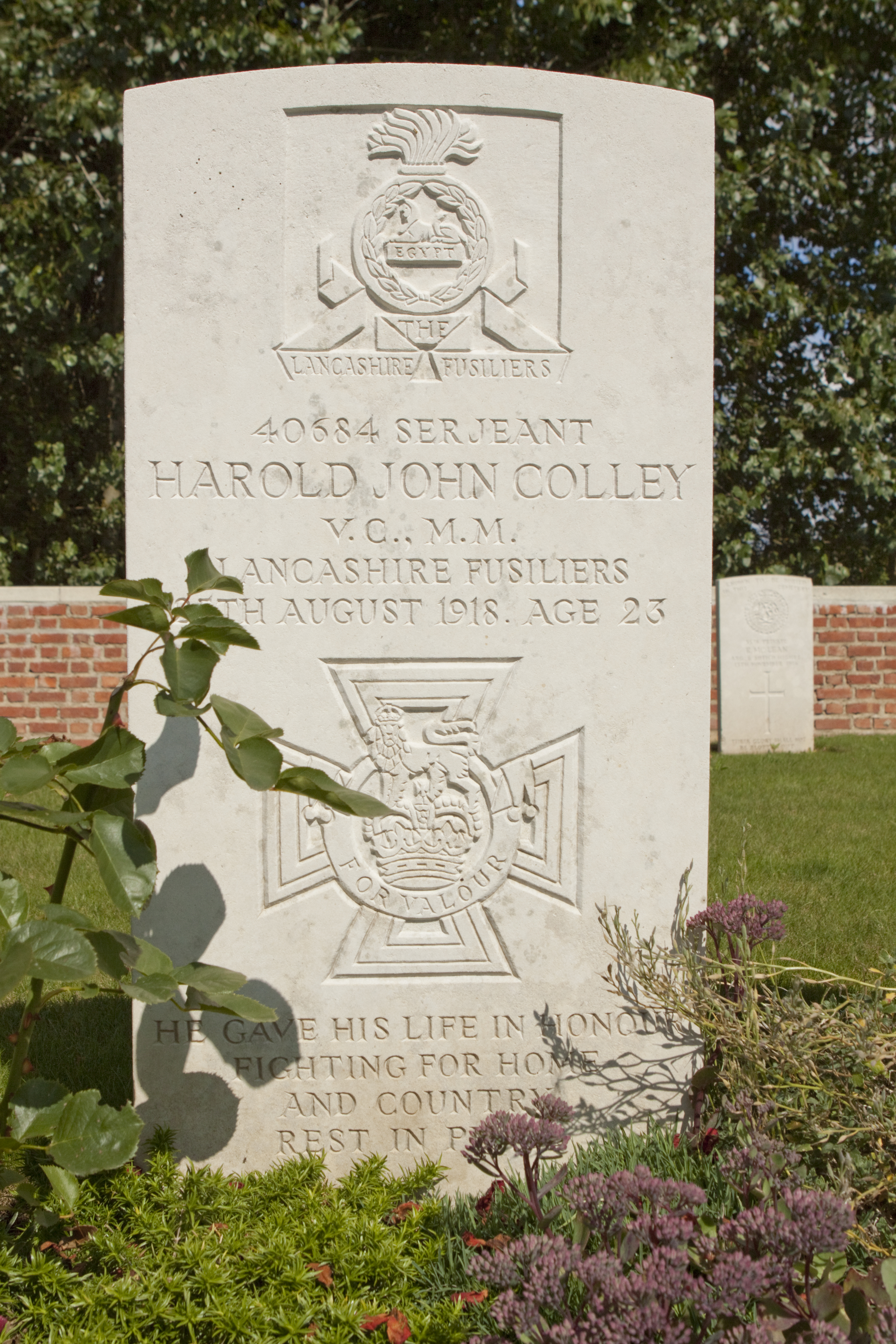
Gravestone of Harold John Colley

== Access ==
The cemetery is located in the fields 450 m southwest of the village church. It is reached by a track which can be difficult to pass in winter.

== Related site ==
About 1,250 m north of Mailly Wood is a smaller military cemetery known as Mailly-Maillet Communal Cemetery Extension. This is adjacent to the village cemetery.
