= Ernest Albert Egerton =

British Army soldier & recipient of the Victoria Cross (1897–1966)

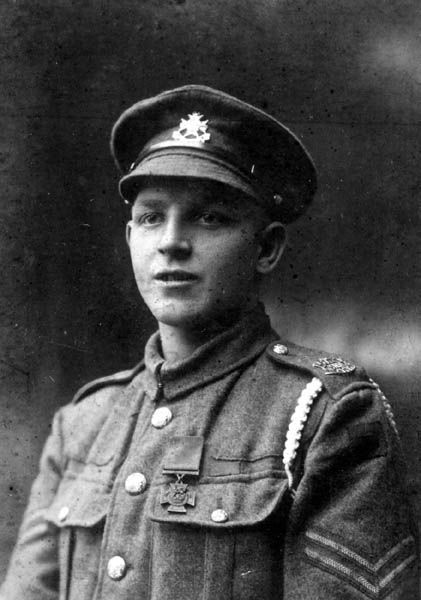
- Born: 10 November 1897; Longton, Staffordshire
- Died: 14 February 1966 (aged 68); Blythe Bridge, Staffordshire
- Burial place: St Peter's Churchyard, Blythe Bridge
- Military career
- Allegiance: United Kingdom
- Branch: British Army
- Service years: 1915 - 1919
- Rank: Sergeant
- Units: North Staffordshire Regiment; The Sherwood Foresters; Home Guard
- Conflicts: World War I; Battle of Passchendaele; World War II
- Awards: Victoria Cross

Ernest Albert Egerton VC (10 November 1897 – 14 February 1966) was an English recipient of the Victoria Cross, the highest and most prestigious award for gallantry in the face of the enemy that can be awarded to British and Commonwealth forces.

Egerton was born on 10 November 1897. When he was 19 years old, and a Corporal in the 16th (Service) Battalion, Sherwood Foresters (Chatsworth Rifles), British Army during the First World War, he was awarded the VC for his actions during the Battle of Passchendaele.

On 20 September 1917 southeast of Ypres, Belgium: ...during an attack, visibility was bad owing to fog and smoke. As a result, the two leading waves of the attack passed over certain hostile dugouts without clearing them and enemy rifles and machine-guns from these dugouts were inflicting severe casualties. Corporal Egerton at once responded to a call for volunteers to help in clearing up the situation and he dashed for the dugouts under heavy fire at short range. He shot a rifleman, a bomber and a gunner, by which time support had arrived and 29 of the enemy surrendered.

The Battalion War Diary records: 'A party was sent out to take the Dug Outs from the Northern side which was led in a most gallant manner by CORPORAL EGERTON of the support Company Several of the Enemy were shot 29 Prisoners including 9 Officers and the Machine Gun were taken here.'

He later achieved the rank of sergeant. He served in the Home Guard in World War II and died on 14 February 1966.

His Victoria Cross is displayed at the Sherwood Foresters Museum in Nottingham Castle.

== Bibliography ==
- Snelling, Stephen (2012) [1998]. Passchendaele 1917. VCs of the First World War. The History Press. ISBN 978-0752476667.
