= Mailly-Maillet Communal Cemetery Extension =

WWI CWGC cemetery in Somme, France

- Commonwealth War Graves Commission
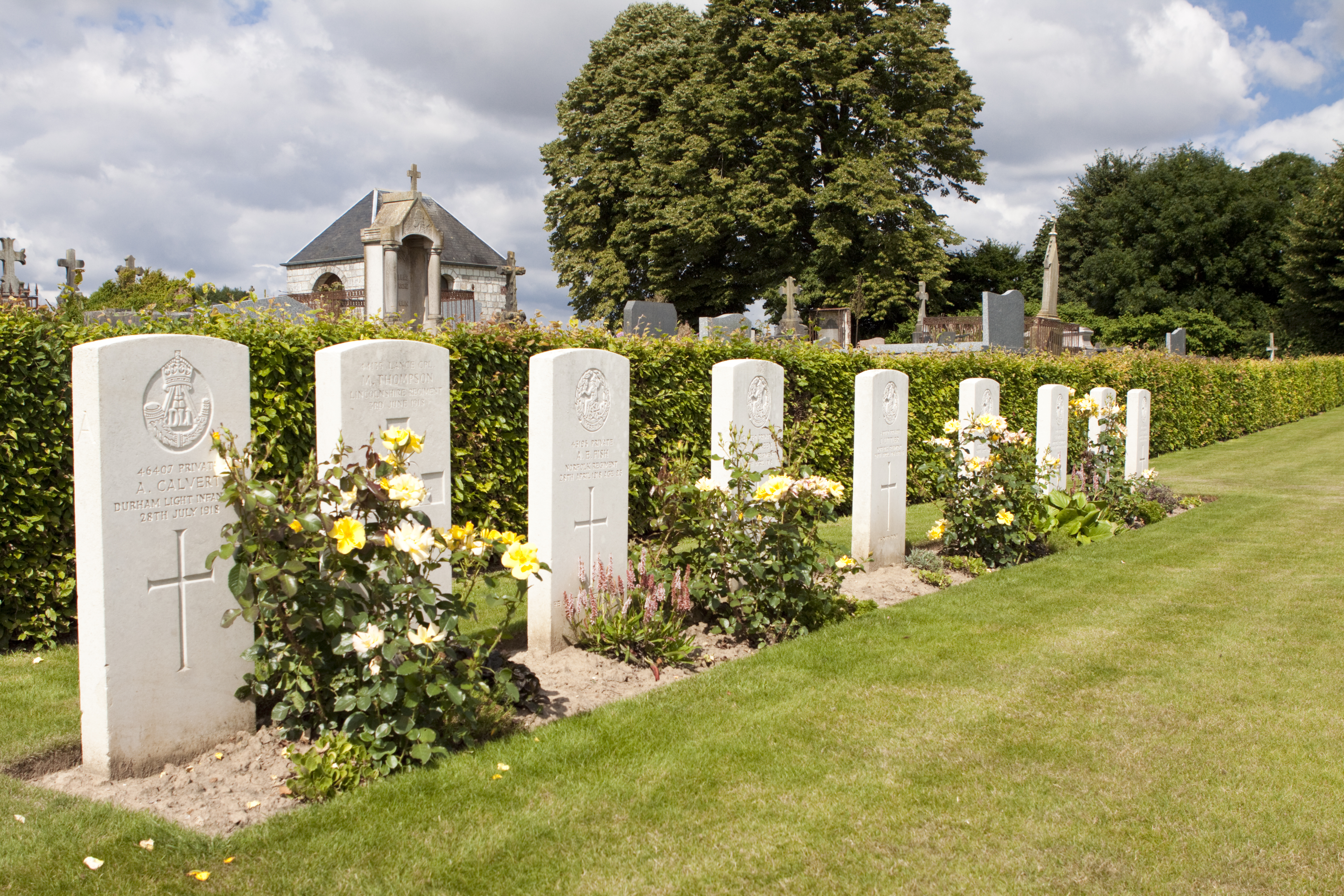
- Used for those deceased
- Location: 50°05′10″N 2°35′47″E

Burials by nation
- Allied Powers

Burials by war
- World War I

Mailly-Maillet Communal Cemetery Extension is a military cemetery with casualties from the First World War, located in the French village of Mailly-Maillet (Somme). It was constructed as an annex to the existing village cemetery from which it is separated by a hedge.

The Extension contains 126 First World War burials, mainly British, but there are 3 New Zealanders, and 1 Newfoundlander. There are 2 men who in 1916 were shot at dawn for desertion.

== History ==
The Extension was originally built in June 1915 by French units. However, the French were relieved by Commonwealth units the same year. The Extension then took on a Commonwealth character. The graves of 51 French and 2 German prisoners of war were transferred to other cemeteries.

== Design ==
It was given its present form after the conflict by the British architect W C Von Berg. There is a Cross of Sacrifice (a feature designed for cemeteries containing 40 or more graves).

== See also ==
There is another military cemetery in the village, Mailly Wood.
