= Rupert Price Hallowes =

Recipient of the Victoria Cross

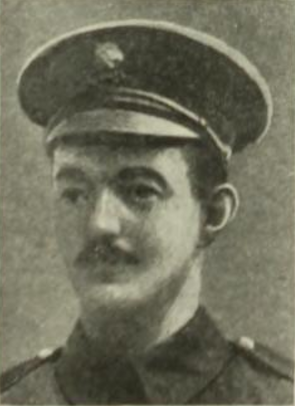
- Born: 5 May 1881; Redhill, Surrey
- Died: 30 September 1915 (aged 34); Hooge, Belgium
- Burial place: Bedford House Commonwealth War Graves Commission Cemetery
- Military career
- Allegiance: United Kingdom
- Branch: British Army
- Service years: 1914–1915
- Rank: Second Lieutenant
- Units: Artists' Rifles; The Middlesex Regiment
- Conflicts: World War I
- Awards: Victoria Cross; Military Cross

Rupert Price Hallowes VC MC (5 May 1881 – 30 September 1915) was a British recipient of the Victoria Cross, the highest and most prestigious award for gallantry in the face of the enemy that can be awarded to British and Commonwealth forces.

He was born to F. B. and Mary Ann Taylor Hallowes, of Redhill, Surrey. He was 34 years old, and a temporary second lieutenant in the 4th Battalion, The Duke of Cambridge's Own (Middlesex Regiment), during the First World War. He was awarded the Victoria Cross for his actions between 25 and 30 September 1915 at Hooge, Belgium.

== Citation ==
For most conspicuous bravery and devotion to duty during the fighting at Hooge between 25th September and 1st October, 1915. Second Lieutenant Hallowes displayed throughout these days the greatest bravery and untiring energy, and set a magnificent example to his men during four heavy and prolonged bombardments. On more than one occasion he climbed up on the parapet, utterly regardless of danger, in order to put fresh heart into his men. He made daring reconnaissances of the German positions in our lines. When the supply of bombs was running short he went back under very heavy shell fire and brought up a fresh supply. Even after he was mortally wounded he continued to cheer those around him and to inspire them with fresh courage.

— London Gazette", No. 29371, 16 November 1915

He died on 30 September 1915, and is buried at Bedford House Commonwealth War Graves Commission Cemetery, Zillebeke, near Ypres.

== Further information ==
Hallowes' Victoria Cross is held as part of the collections of the National Army Museum, Chelsea, London. He was also a holder of the Military Cross. A peacetime scoutmaster, he is one of 32 Scouting related persons to win the Victoria Cross. There is a memorial to Rupert Hallowes on the ground floor of Neath Port Talbot Hospital at the entrance into 'Radiology Dept'.

== Bibliography ==
- Batchelor, Peter; Matson, Christopher (2011). The Western Front 1915. VCs of the First World War. The History Press. ISBN 978-0-7524-6057-4.
