= Duhallow ADS Cemetery =

WWI CWGC site in Ypres, Belgium

Duhallow ADS
- Commonwealth War Graves Commission
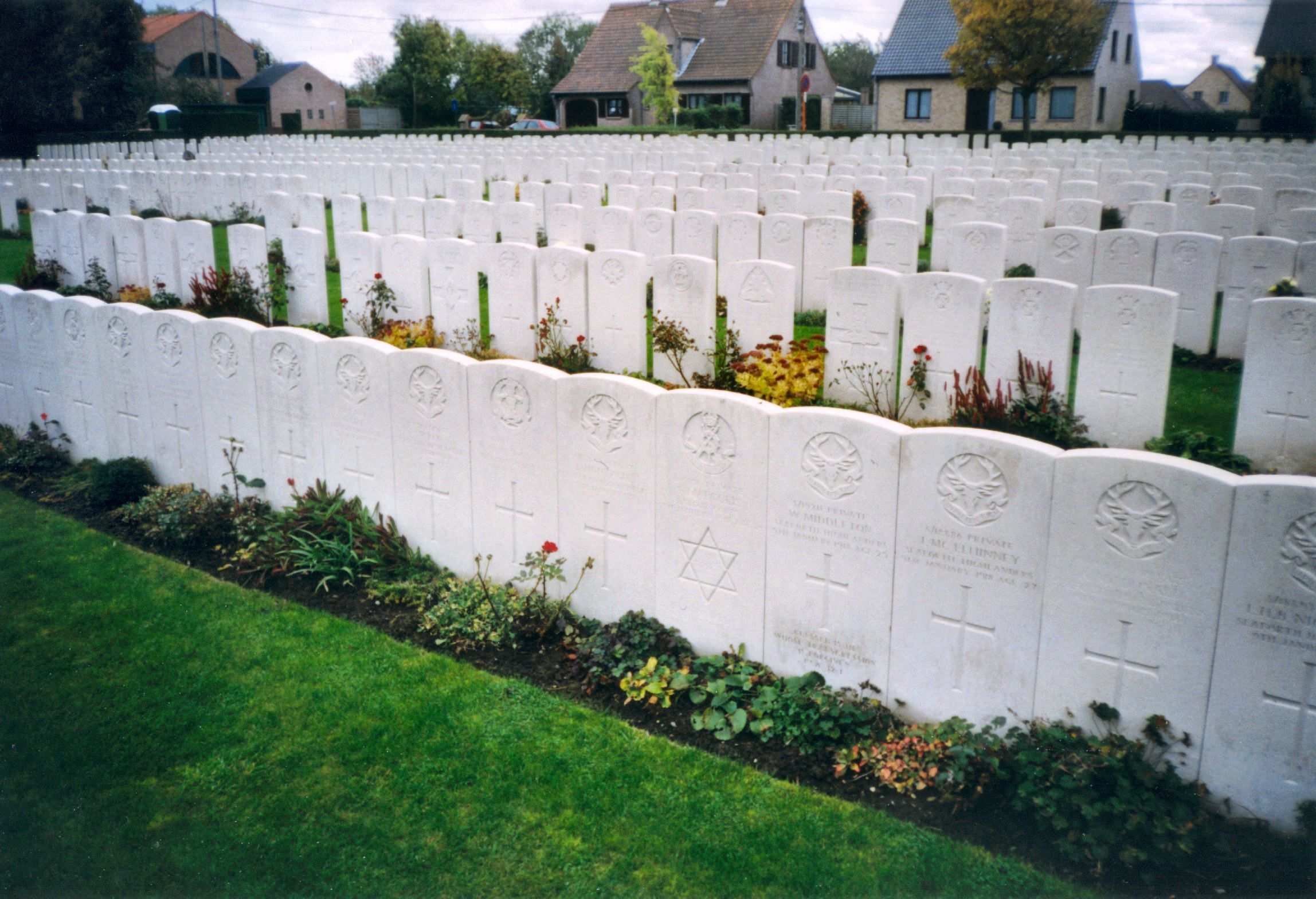
- Used for those deceased 1917–1918
- Established: July 1917
- Location: 50°51′51″N 02°52′39″E near Ypres, West Flanders, Belgium
- Designed by: Sir Reginald Blomfield
- Total burials: 1602
- Unknowns: 234

Burials by nation
- Allied Powers: United Kingdom: 1470; Canada: 38; Newfoundland: Australia: 26; New Zealand: 6; South Africa: 3; British West Indies: France: 1; Undivided India: 1; Belgium: 1; Central Powers: Germany: 54

Burials by war
- World War I: 1601 World War II: 1

Duhallow ADS (Advanced Dressing Station) Cemetery is a Commonwealth War Graves Commission burial ground for the dead of the First World War located near Ypres on the Western Front in Belgium.

The cemetery grounds were assigned to the United Kingdom in perpetuity by King Albert I of Belgium in recognition of the sacrifices made by the British Empire in the defence and liberation of Belgium during the war.

== Foundation ==
"Duhallow" is an Irish toponym and the cemetery is believed named after a south Ireland hunt. The position, north of Ypres, was used as an Advanced Dressing Station (a first aid post set back from the main front but within easy reach of it) for Commonwealth troops in the area. This led to the establishment of the cemetery for those who did not survive; this cemetery was expanded by the addition of the dead from nearby Casualty Clearing Stations at the front line itself.

Additionally, there are graves for the men of the 13th Company Labour Corps who were killed by a German aircraft bombing a Commonwealth ammunition truck. The cemetery was further expanded after the armistice by the concentration of isolated graves.

== Design ==
The cemetery was designed by Sir Reginald Blomfield.

== Memorials ==
=== Duhallow Blocks ===
The cemetery has given its name to the "Duhallow Block", a special memorial for soldiers whose graves were destroyed in later battles. Two blocks in the cemetery (along with stones for the individual soldiers) commemorate those buried in the nearby Malakoff Farm and Fusilier Wood cemeteries, which were destroyed by shelling. Later, Duhallow Blocks were also placed in other British cemeteries.

=== Notable graves ===
The cemetery contains the graves of 1602 soldiers.

Graves include one World War II Commonwealth casualty, killed during the retreat in May 1940.

Also buried here is Private 10603 John Seymour of the 2nd Battalion of the Royal Inniskilling Fusiliers, who was executed by the British authorities on 24 January 1918 for being absent from roll call on 27 November 1917. He was known to suffer from "nerves" and was executed partially to set an example to his battalion's 300 new recruits.

== Gallery ==
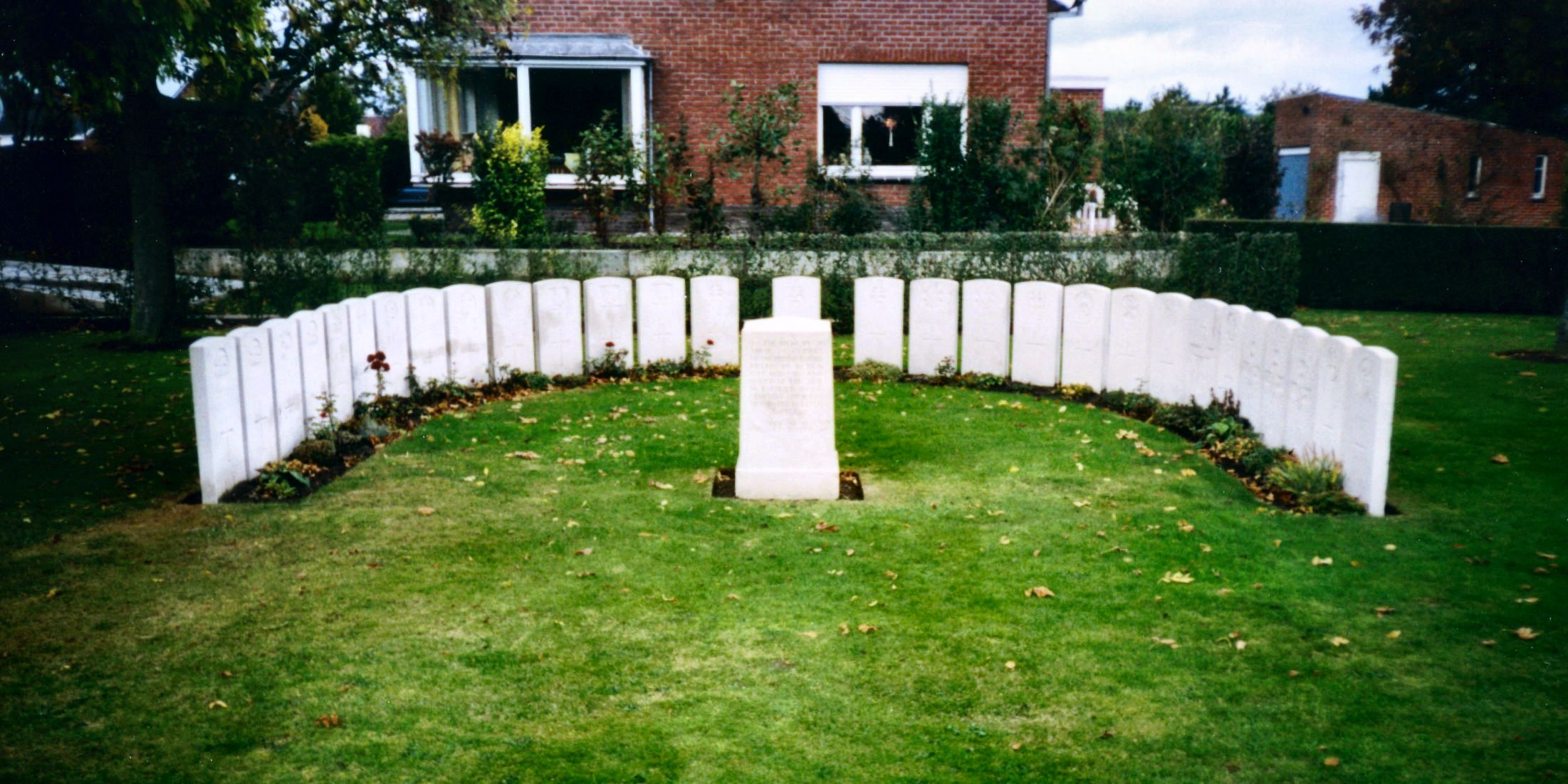
A "Duhallow Block" and related memorials for individual soldiers

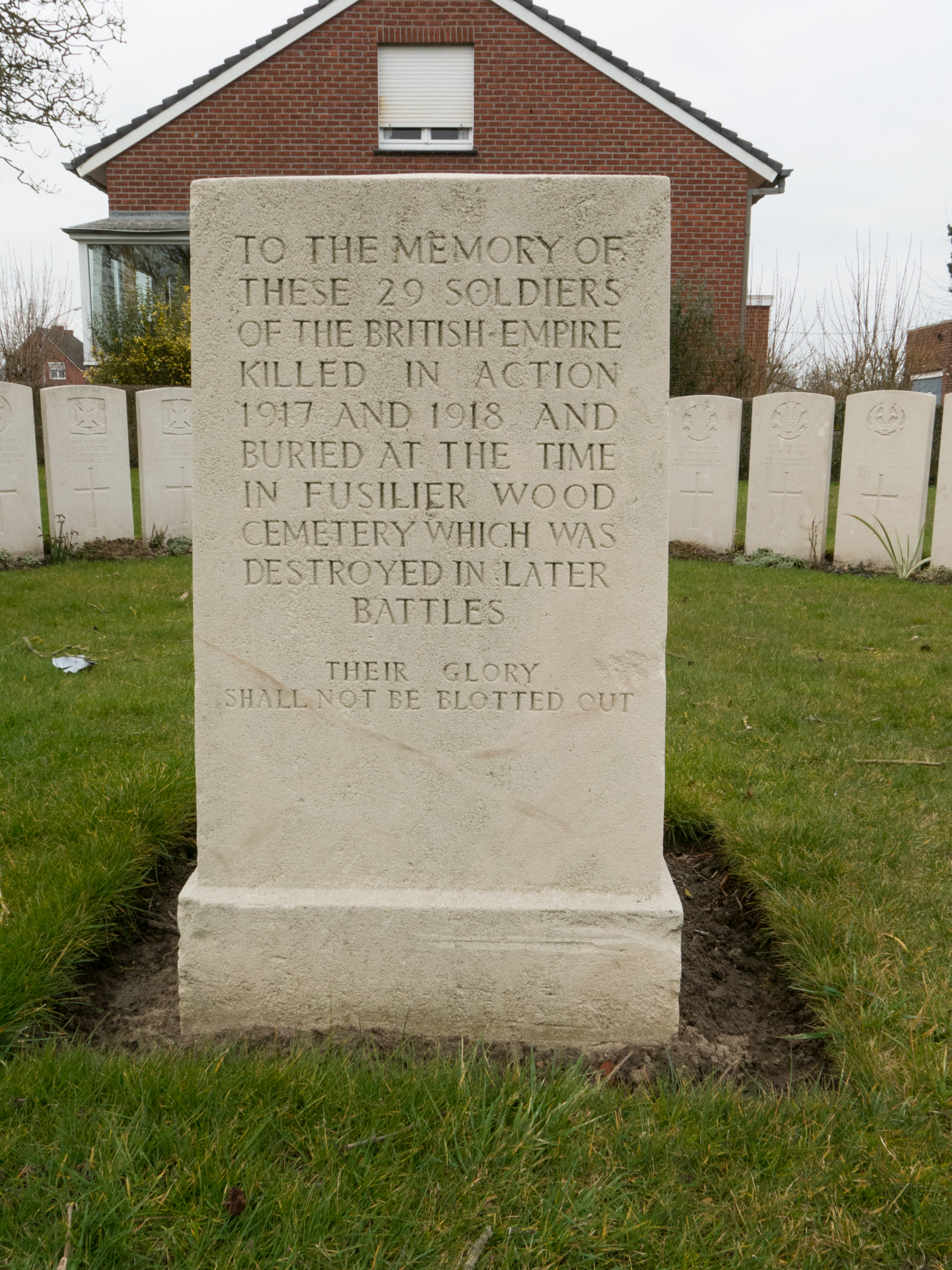
The inscription on a Duhallow Block

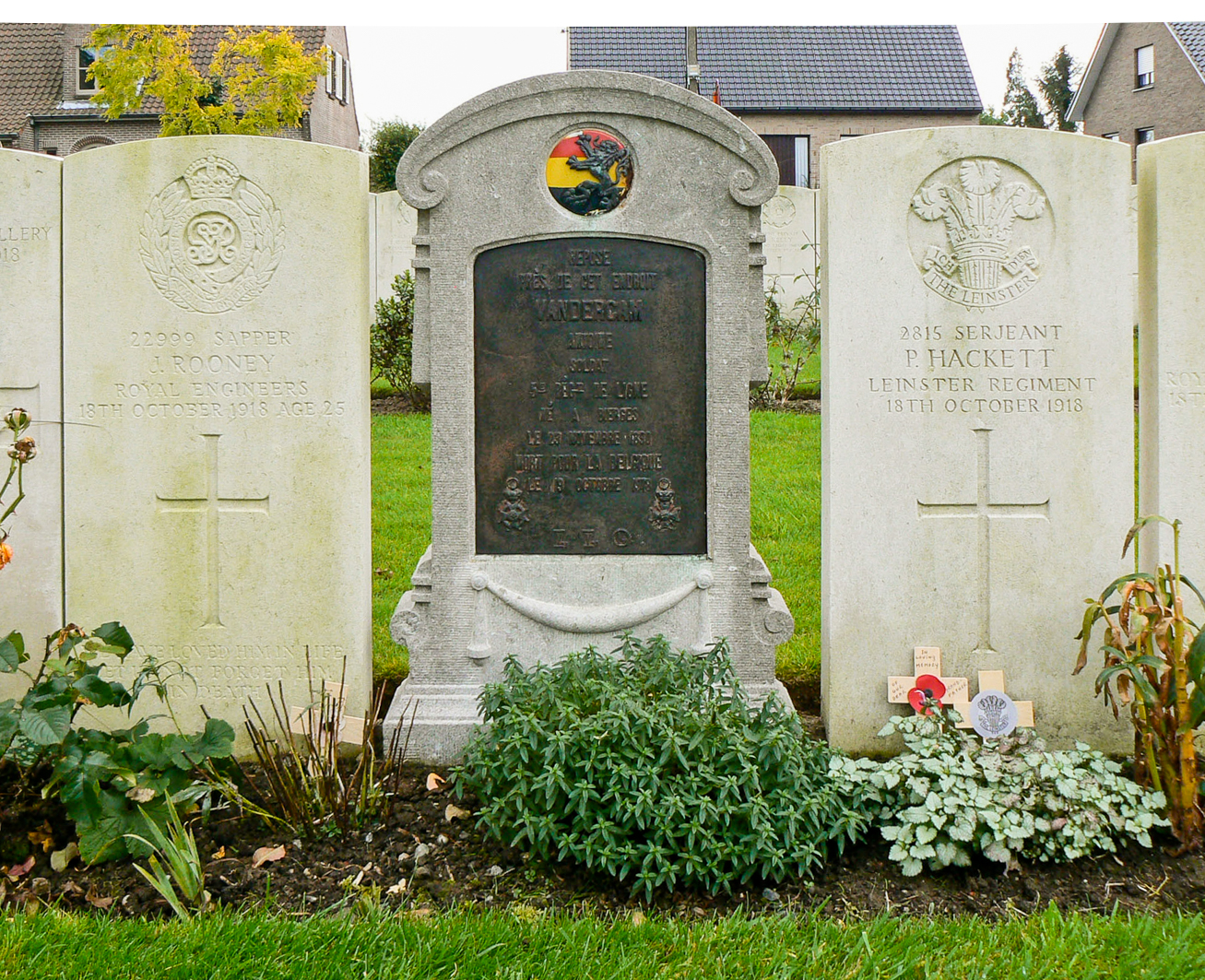
Gravestones including a Belgian grave.

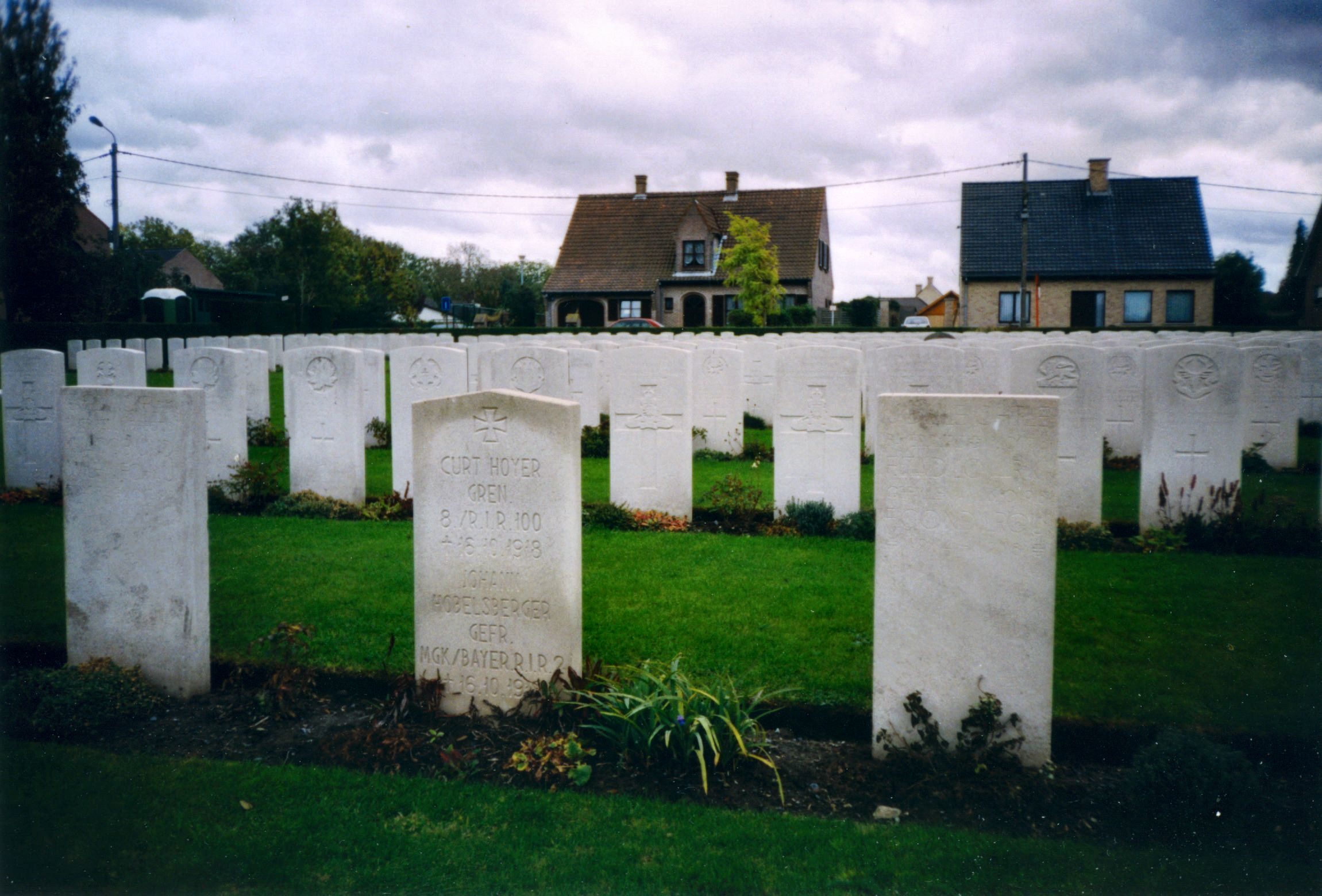
Duhallow ADS, including three of the 54 German graves.
