= Bedford House Cemetery =

WWI & WWII CWGC site in Ypres, Belgium

Bedford House
- Commonwealth War Graves Commission
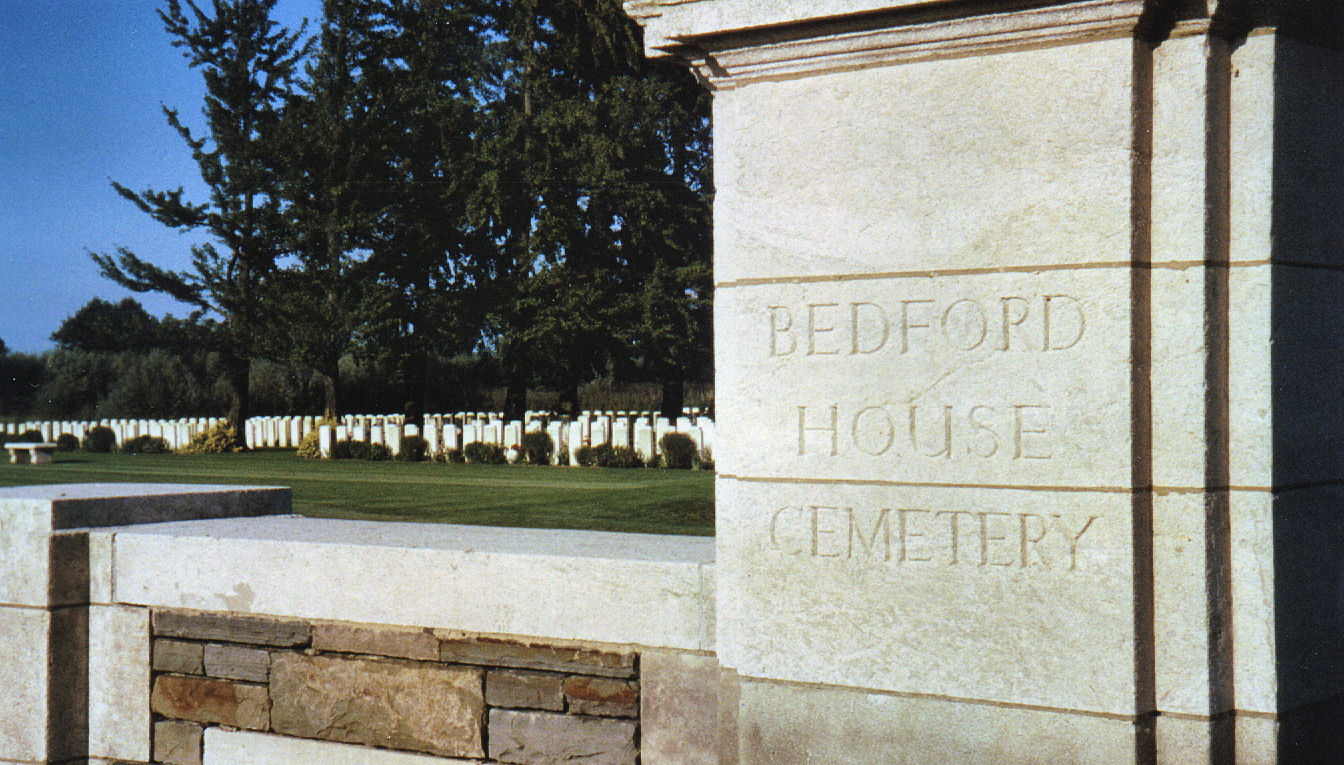
- Used for those deceased 1914–1918 and 1939–1945
- Established: 1914
- Location: 50°49′44″N 02°53′29″E near Ypres, West Flanders, Belgium
- Designed by: Wilfred Clement Von Berg
- Total burials: 5144
- Unknowns: 3011

Burials by nation
- Allied Powers: United Kingdom: 4425; Canada: 390; Australia: 249; New Zealand: 36; South Africa: 21; India: 21; Central Powers: Germany: 2

Burials by war
- World War I: 5075 World War II: 69

UNESCO World Heritage Site
- Official name: Funerary and memory sites of the First World War (Western Front)
- Type: Cultural
- Criteria: i, ii, vi
- Designated: 2023 (45th session)
- Reference no.: 1567-FL18
- Statistics source: wo1.be and CWGC

Bedford House Cemetery is a Commonwealth War Graves Commission burial ground for the dead of the First World War located near Zillebeke, itself near Ypres, on the Western Front in Belgium.

The cemetery grounds were assigned to the United Kingdom in perpetuity by King Albert I of Belgium in recognition of the sacrifices made by the British Empire in the defence and liberation of Belgium during the war.

== Foundation ==
Zillebeke was directly behind the Western Front, making it a useful site for divisional headquarters and field ambulance stations. Château Rosendal, a large house with a moat and extensive gardens was put to this use. The British forces in the area named the château "Bedford House" or "Woodcote House", with the former becoming the official name used for the post-war cemetery.

Whilst the area remained in Allied hands through the war, it was devastated by shell fire and the château was razed over the course of the war, being hit by German 8-inch shells, as well as 500 gas shells in just one day of the Third Battle of Ypres.

== Enclosures No 1 and No 5 ==
Five cemeteries were established in the grounds. At the end of the war, the earliest of these was moved to White House cemetery in Sint Jan, whilst the fifth was relocated to Aeroplane cemetery in Ypres.

== Enclosure No 2 ==
The second cemetery was established in December 1915 and remained in use until October 1918. After the Armistice, 437 graves were concentrated in this enclosure from two nearby battlefield cemeteries, Ecole de Bienfaisance and Asylum British, that the Commission could not maintain. Unusual for a Commonwealth cemetery on the Western Front, there are collective burials in this enclosure, although individual headstones have still been provided, marked "Buried near this spot".

== Enclosure No 3 ==
The third cemetery is the smallest and was in use from February 1915 until December 1916.

== Enclosure No 4 ==
The fourth cemetery is the largest. It was founded in June 1916 and in use until February 1918. Post-war, it received reburials of 3324 troops from other cemeteries or found under the former battlefields. The identities of most of these troops is unknown.

== Enclosure No 6 ==
A sixth cemetery was established in the 1930s for reburials of remains still being found in the area. This cemetery also received the remains of 69 British Expeditionary Force troops killed in the area during the rearguard action leading to the Dunkirk evacuation. Three of these soldiers' identities are unknown.

== Special memorials ==
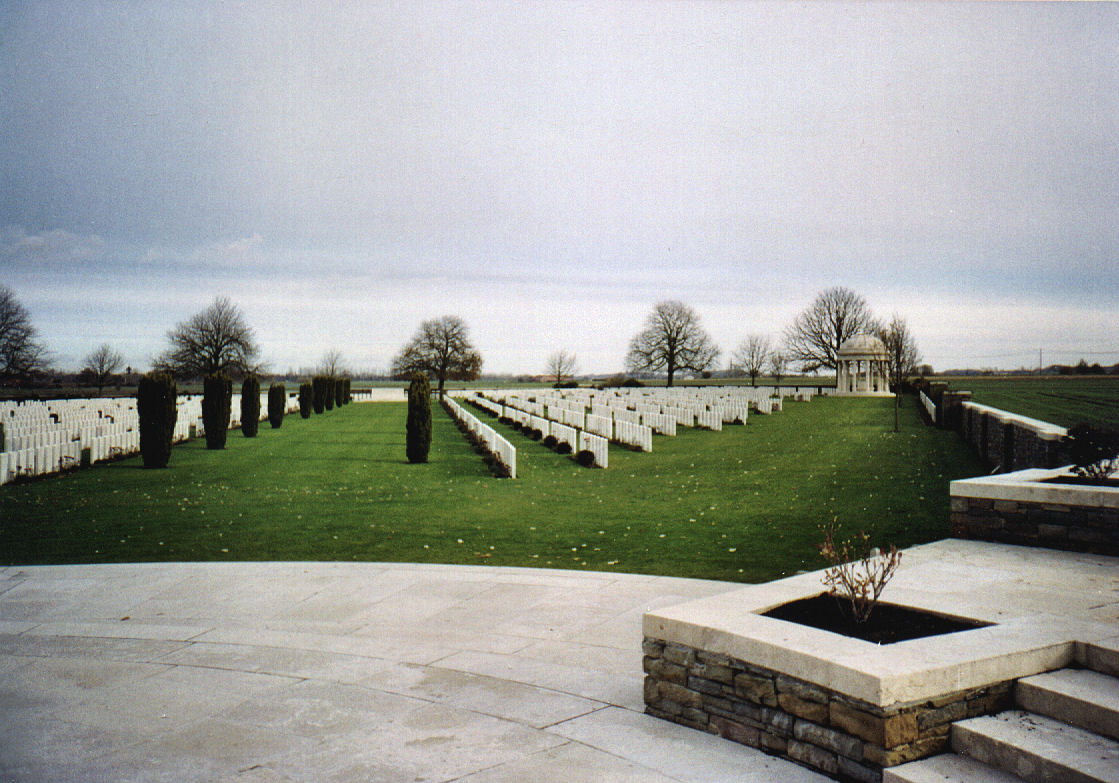
Bedford House from the central raised area, looking away from the entrance

The cemetery as a whole has 47 "special memorials". In the form of stone obelisks or just headstones with special notations, they record the names of soldiers whose graves were lost in later fighting or could not be found after the war. As these are known casualties (not "missing"), they are included in the total figure for burials in the cemetery and are not recorded on the Menin Gate.

The entire cemetery was designed by Wilfred Clement Von Berg.

== Notable graves ==
Enclosure No 4 holds the grave of Second Lieutenant Rupert Price Hallowes, a Welsh soldier who was awarded both the Military Cross and the Victoria Cross, the highest award for valour "in the face of the enemy" in the Commonwealth.

Also buried in No 4 is Private Frederick Turner of the Northumberland Fusiliers. He was executed by his own side on 23 October 1917 for desertion. Such "shot at dawn" executions were pardoned by the British government in 2006.
