= Duhallow Block =

A Duhallow Block is a type of memorial that is erected where graves have been lost, for example when they have been destroyed by subsequent conflict. It is a marker stone which is found in cemeteries maintained by the Commonwealth War Graves Commission.

Duhallow Blocks are accompanied by individual memorials for the dead. These often bear an inscription, "Their Glory Shall Not Be Blotted Out", words from the Bible which Rudyard Kipling put forward to the Commission for use on special memorials.

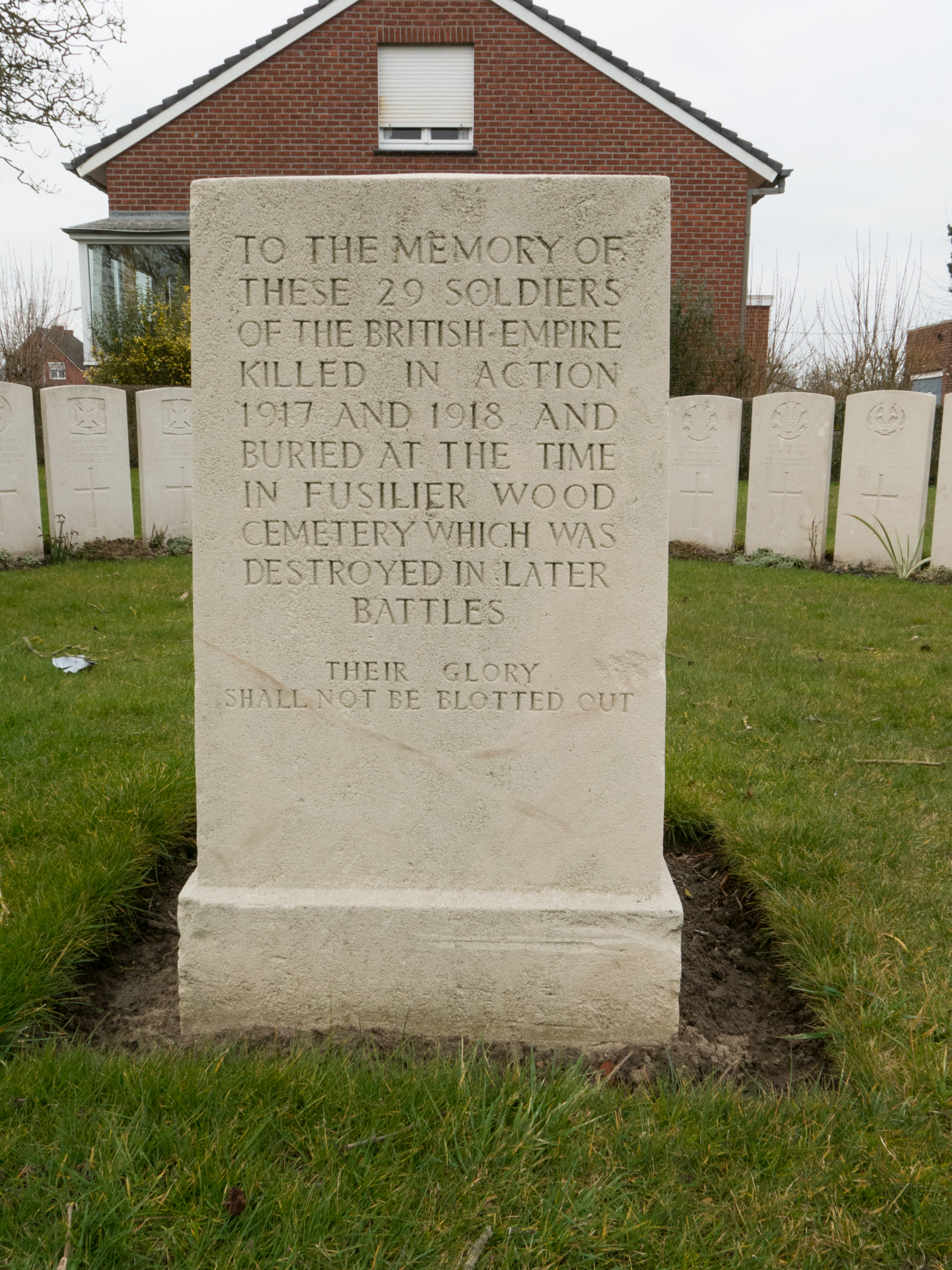
One of two Duhallow Blocks at Duhallow ADS Cemetery. This one records the destruction of graves at Fusilier Wood.

== History ==
Duhallow Blocks have been used since the Imperial War Graves Commission, as it was then called, constructed its First World War cemeteries. The block takes its name from Duhallow ADS Cemetery located near Ypres in Belgium. In the case of this cemetery, which was begun in 1917, there was a need to commemorate soldiers whose graves at nearby sites on the Western Front had been destroyed.
