= Englebelmer =

- Commune
- Coat of arms
- Location of Englebelmer
- Location within France Location within Hauts-de-France
- Coordinates: 50°03′41″N 2°36′35″E
- Country: France
- Region: Hauts-de-France
- Department: Somme
- Arrondissement: Péronne
- Canton: Albert
- Intercommunality: Pays du Coquelicot

Government
  - Mayor (2020–2026): Emilie Bruge-Christian
- Area^{1}: 9.41 km^{2} (3.63 sq mi)
- Elevation: 151 m (495 ft)
- Highest elevation: 146 m (479 ft)
- Lowest elevation: 95 m (312 ft)
- Population (2023): 282
  - Density: 30.0/km^{2} (77.6/sq mi)
- Time zone: UTC+01:00 (CET)
  - Summer (DST): UTC+02:00 (CEST)
- INSEE/Postal code: 80266 /80300
- ^{1} French Land Register data, which excludes lakes, ponds, glaciers > 1 km^{2} (0.386 sq mi or 247 acres) and river estuaries.

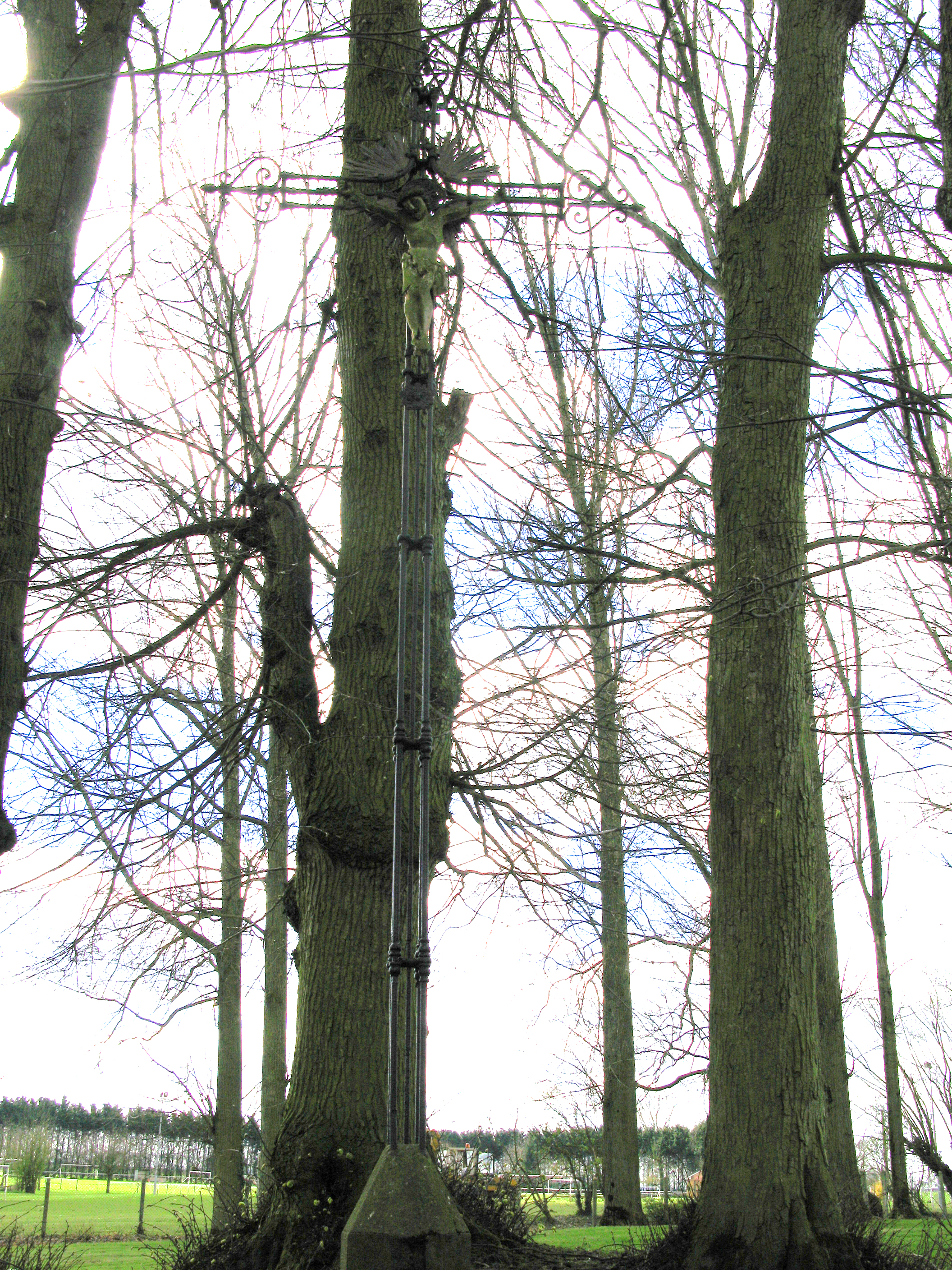
Englebelmer (Somme, France) - The Calvary

Englebelmer (Picard: Ingbèlmèr) is a commune in the Somme department in Hauts-de-France in northern France.

== Geography ==
Englebelmer is situated 20 miles (32 km) northeast of Amiens on the D129.

== Population ==
Historical population
Year	Pop.	±% p.a.
1968	287	—
1975	276	−0.56%
1982	269	−0.37%
1990	258	−0.52%
1999	242	−0.71%
2007	241	−0.05%
2012	293	+3.98%
2017	299	+0.41%
2023	282	−0.97%
Source: INSEE

== See also ==
- Communes of the Somme department
