= Wilfred Clement Von Berg =

British architect (1894–1978)

W C von Berg
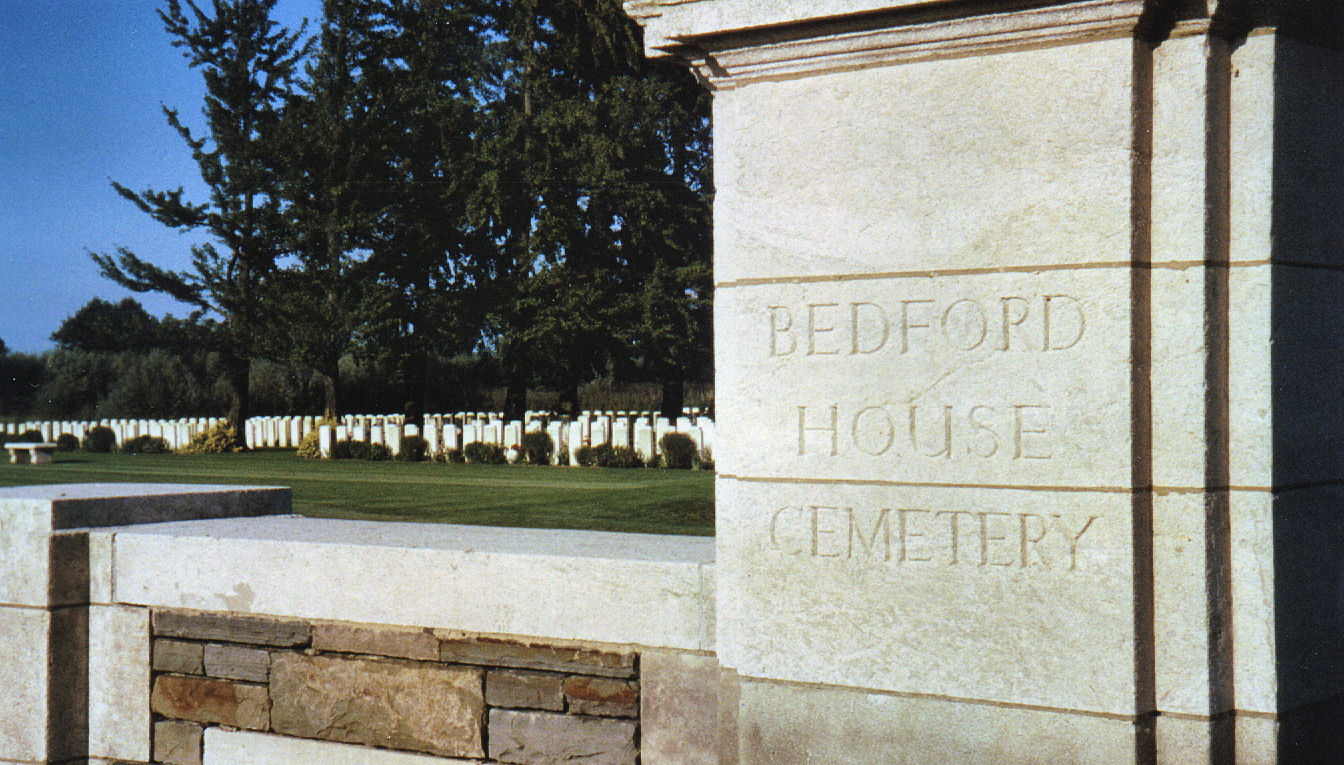
- Bedford House Commonwealth War Graves Commission Cemetery, Ypres, Belgium
- Born: 1894; Croydon, England
- Died: 1978 (aged 83–84)
- Occupation: Architect
- Buildings: Perry's Stores, South Africa
- Projects: Commonwealth War Graves Commission sites

Captain Wilfred Clement von Berg MC (21 October 1894 – July 1978) was a British architect.

== Career and education ==
Croydon-born Von Berg began to study architecture in 1912. During World War I he served with the London Rifle Brigade. At the end of the conflict he joined the Imperial (now Commonwealth) War Graves Commission as an assistant architect. Working under principal architects Sir Reginald Blomfield, Sir Edwin Lutyens and Charles Holden he designed some 39 cemeteries, including the large Bedford House Commonwealth War Graves Commission Cemetery outside of Ypres in Belgium.

On leaving the Commission, he began practising architecture in France, moving to the Transvaal in South Africa in 1931. He set up a practice there, beginning with designing the Perry's department store in Benoni. His practice was interrupted by World War II, where he served with the South African Engineers in the camouflage unit. He returned to his practice at the end of the war, finally retiring in 1977.
