= 105th Brigade (United Kingdom) =

- Active: World War I
- Allegiance: United Kingdom
- Branch: Infantry (Bantam)
- Part of: 35th Division (United Kingdom)
- Engagements: Western Front

The 105th Brigade was a formation of the British Army during the First World War. It was raised as part of the new army, also known as Kitchener's Army and assigned to the 35th Division. The brigade served on the Western Front.

== History ==
The infantry was originally composed of Bantams, that is soldiers who would otherwise be excluded from service due to their short stature. This became a regular infantry Brigade with the end of the Bantam experiment at the end of 1916, after it was noted that bantam replacements were not up to the physical standards of the original recruits.

The brigade was disbanded in April 1919 at Ripon, the brigade was not reformed in the Second World War.

== Order of Battle ==
The composition of the brigade was as follows:

- 15th (Service) Battalion, Cheshire Regiment (1st Birkenhead)
- 16th (Service) Battalion, Cheshire Regiment (2nd Birkenhead) (disbanded February 1918)
- 14th (Service) Battalion, Gloucestershire Regiment (West of England) (disbanded February 1918)
- 15th (Service) Battalion, Sherwood Foresters (Nottingham)
- 4th (Extra Reserve) Battalion, North Staffordshire Regiment (joined February 1918)
- 105th Machine Gun Company (joined April 1916, left for division MG battalion February 1918)
- 105th Trench Mortar Battery (joined February 1916)

== Commanders ==
- Brig-Gen J. G. Hunter C.B. to 16 April 1916
- Lt-Col T Ranken 16 April 1916, to 1 May 1916
- Lt-Col F W Daniell 1 to 6 May 1916
- Brig-Gen A H Marindin 6 May 1916, to 27 March 1918
- Lt-Col A W Crellin 27 to 31 March 1819
- Lt-Col W Appleyard 31 March to 7 April 1918
- Brig-Gen A Carton de Wiart V.C., D.S.O. 7 to 20 April (wounded)
- Lt-Col L M Stevens 20 to 22 April 1918
- Brig-Gen A J Turner C.M.G. D.S.O. 22 April 1918 to March 1919

== Bibliography ==
- Davson, H.M. (1926). The History of the 35th Division in the Great War. London: Sifton Praed. OCLC 6048597.
- Joslen, H. F. (2003) [1960]. Orders of Battle: Second World War, 1939–1945. Uckfield, East Sussex: Naval and Military Press. ISBN 978-1-84342-474-1.
