= William Herbert Anderson =

Recipient of the Victoria Cross (1881-1918)

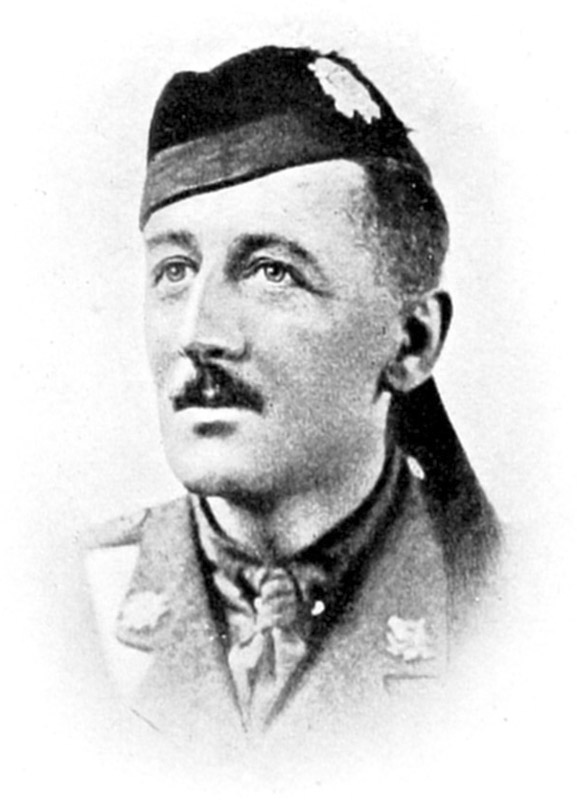
- Born: 29 December 1881; Glasgow, Scotland
- Died: 25 March 1918 (aged 36) near Maricourt, France
- Burial place: Peronne Road Cemetery, Maricourt
- Military career
- Allegiance: United Kingdom
- Branch: British Army
- Service years: 1918
- Rank: Lieutenant Colonel
- Units: Cameronians; Highland Light Infantry
- Conflicts: World War I: Western Front; German spring offensive †
- Awards: Victoria Cross
- Other work: Accountant

Lieutenant Colonel William Herbert Anderson VC (29 December 1881 – 25 March 1918) was a Scottish recipient of the Victoria Cross, the highest and most prestigious award for gallantry in the face of the enemy that can be awarded to British and Commonwealth forces.

Anderson was born on 29 December 1881 to W. J. Anderson CBE, who resided at Strathairly, Largo, Fife. He was married to Gertrude Campbell. He was educated at Fettes College.

Anderson was 36 years old and an acting lieutenant colonel in the British Army, in the 12th (S) Battalion, The Highland Light Infantry, during the First World War, and was awarded the VC for his actions on 25 March 1918 at Bois Favieres, near Maricourt, France. He died as a result of the act for which he was commended.

For most conspicuous bravery, determination, and gallant leading of his command. The enemy attacked on the right of the battalion frontage and succeeded in penetrating the wood held by our men. Owing to successive lines of the enemy following on closely there was the greatest danger that the flank of the whole position would be turned. Grasping the seriousness of the situation, Colonel Anderson made his way across the open in full view of the enemy now holding the wood on the right, and after much effort succeeded in gathering the remainder of the two right companies. He personally led the counter-attack and drove the enemy from the wood, capturing twelve machine guns and seventy prisoners, and restoring the original line. His conduct in leading the charge was quite fearless and his most splendid example was the means of rallying and inspiring the men during the most critical hour. Later on the same day, in another position, the enemy had penetrated to within three hundred yards of the village and were holding a timber yard in force. Colonel Anderson reorganised his men after they had been driven in and brought them forward to a position of readiness for a counterattack. He led the attack in person and throughout showed the utmost disregard for his own safety. The counter-attack drove the enemy from his position, but resulted in this very gallant officer losing his life. He died fighting within the enemy's lines, setting a magnificent example to all who were privileged to serve under him.

A novel, The Way Home, was published in 2007 about Bertie Anderson and his three brothers, all of whom were also killed in the First World War. It was written by Robin Scott-Elliot, Bertie's great-grandson. Anderson's VC is on display at the Lord Ashcroft Gallery in the Imperial War Museum.
