= John Hunter (British Indian Army officer) =

British Army officer

John Gunning Hunter
- Born: 1 November 1859
- Died: 11 June 1926 (aged 66)
- Military career
- Allegiance: United Kingdom
- Branch: British Indian Army
- Rank: Major-General
- Commands: 35th Division
- Conflicts: First World War
- Awards: Companion of the Order of the Bath

Major-General John Gunning Hunter CB (1 November 1859 – 11 June 1926) was a British Indian Army officer who commanded the 35th Division on an acting basis during the First World War.

== Military career ==
Educated at Cheltenham College and the Royal Military College, Sandhurst, Hunter was commissioned into the 70th (Surrey) Regiment of Foot on 1 May 1878. He transferred to the British Indian Army and, after serving in the Second Anglo-Afghan War from 1878 to 1880, commanded the 7th Battalion, Jat Regiment.

He saw action during the First World War and served as commander of the 105th Brigade from its formation until 16 April 1916 and, during that period, briefly commanded the 35th Division on an acting basis from 1 July 1915 to 5 July 1915. He was promoted to major-general under special appointment to the War Office in September 1917.

He was appointed a Companion of the Order of the Bath in the 1913 Birthday Honours.

== Sources ==
- Davson, H. M. (2003) [1926]. The History of the 35th Division in the Great War (Naval & Military Press ed.). London: Sifton Praed & Co. Ltd. ISBN 978-1-84342-643-1.
