= Stanley McDougall =

Australian recipient of the Victoria Cross

Stanley McDougall VC MM
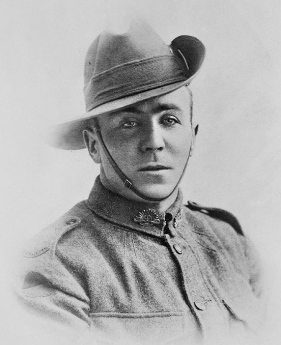
- Sergeant Stanley Robert McDougall c. 1917
- Born: 23 July 1889; Hobart, Tasmania
- Died: 7 July 1968 (aged 78); Scottsdale, Tasmania
- Burial place: Norwood Crematorium, Canberra
- Military career
- Allegiance: Australia
- Branch: Australian Imperial Force
- Service years: 1915–1918
- Rank: Sergeant
- Units: 47th Battalion
- Conflicts: First World War
- Awards: Victoria Cross; Military Medal

Stanley Robert McDougall, VC, MM (23 July 1889 – 7 July 1968) was an Australian recipient of the Victoria Cross, the highest award given to British and Commonwealth forces for gallantry in the face of the enemy.

== Early life ==
The son of the sawmiller John Henry McDougall (1854–1910), and Susannah Ann McDougall (1856–1919), née Cate, McDougall was born on 23 July 1889 at Recherche Bay, Tasmania, where he was raised and educated.

In civilian life, he was an amateur boxer, and a blacksmith by trade, and was considered an excellent horseman, an expert marksman, and a competent bushman.

== War service ==
Illness prevented him from enlisting in the Australian Imperial Force to fight in the First World War until 31 August 1915. He was 28 years old and a sergeant in the 47th Battalion, Australian Imperial Force when he performed the actions for which he was awarded the VC.

On 28 March 1918 at Dernancourt, France, when an enemy attack succeeded in securing a foothold in the Allied line, McDougall charged the second wave single-handedly, killing seven men and capturing a machine-gun, which he turned on the attackers, routing them and causing many casualties. He continued his attack until his ammunition ran out, when he seized a bayonet and charged again, killing three men and an officer. Then, using a Lewis gun, he killed many more of the enemy and made it possible for 33 prisoners to be taken. His prompt action saved the line and halted the enemy's advance. The fighting ground where this took place was the location where his younger brother Wallace had been killed some nine months earlier.

Eight days later he repelled another enemy attack at the same spot, for which he was awarded the Military Medal.

== Later life ==
On 19 August 1918, he was invested with the Victoria Cross at Windsor Castle by King George V. He returned to Australia and was discharged on 15 December 1918.

McDougall subsequently worked for the Tasmanian Forestry Department and became an inspector in charge of forests in the north-western part of Tasmania. He returned to London in 1956 for the celebration marking 100 years since the establishment of the Victoria Cross. He died on 7 July 1968 at Scottsdale, Tasmania, and was survived by his wife Martha (née Anderson-Harrison), whom he had married in 1926; they had no children. He is buried at Norwood Crematorium, Canberra.

A street in Canberra is named after him. His Victoria Cross is displayed at the Australian War Memorial.

A retouched portrait of Sergeant (Sgt) Stanley Robert McDougall VC MM
