= Bantam (military) =

In British Army soldier of below 160 cm

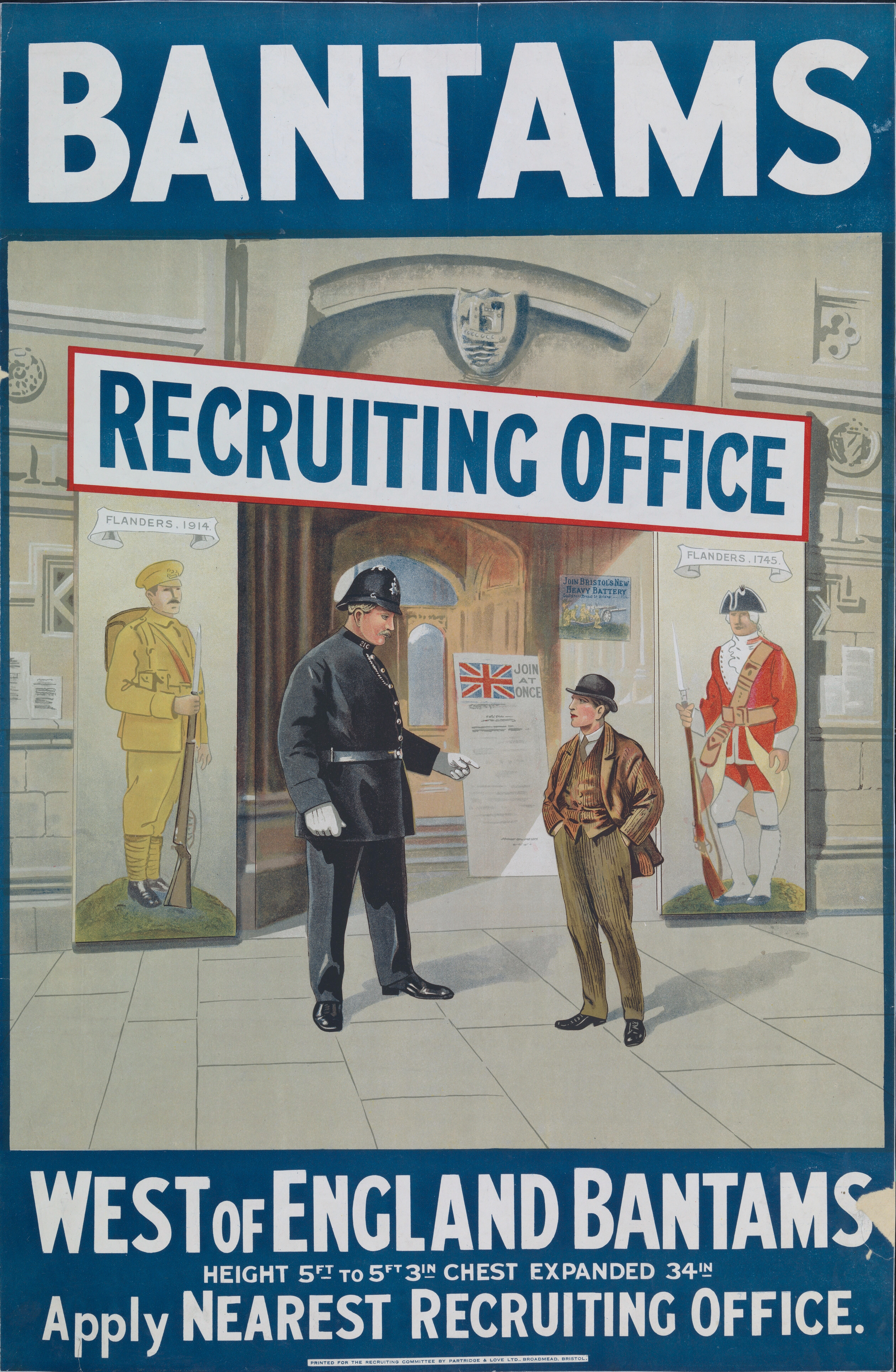
World War I recruiting poster

A bantam, in British Army usage, was a soldier of below the army's minimum regulation height of 5 ft 3 in (160 cm).

During the First World War, the British Army raised battalions in which the normal minimum height requirement for recruits was reduced from 5 ft 3 in (160 cm) to 5 ft (150 cm). This enabled shorter but healthy young men to enlist.

Bantam units enlisted from industrial and coal-mining areas where short stature was no sign of weakness. The name derives from the town of Bantam in Indonesia, from which a breed of small domestic fowl allegedly originated. Bantamweight was a weight category in boxing that had originated in the 1880s and had produced many notable boxers.

The first "bantam battalions" were recruited in Birkenhead, Cheshire, after Alfred Bigland, MP, heard of a group of miners who, rejected from every recruiting office, had made their way to the town. One of the miners, rejected on account of his size, offered to fight any man there as proof of his suitability as a soldier, and six men were eventually called upon to remove him. Bantam applicants were men used to physical hard work, and Bigland was so incensed at what he saw as the needless rejection of spirited healthy men that he petitioned the War Office for permission to establish an undersized fighting unit.

When the permission was granted, news spread across the country and men previously denied the chance to fight made their way to Birkenhead, 3,000 successful recruits being accepted for service into two new bantam battalions in November 1914. The requirement for their height was between 4 ft 10 in (147 cm) and 5 ft 3 in (160 cm). Chest size was one inch (2.5 cm) more than the army standard.

The men became local heroes, with the local newspaper, The Birkenhead News, honouring the men of the 1st and 2nd Birkenhead Battalions of the Cheshires with enamel badges, "BBB", "Bigland's Birkenhead Bantams". Soon renamed the 15th and 16th (Service) Battalions, Cheshire Regiment, they undertook gruelling training and served in some of the hardest-fought battles of the war, such as the Battle of Arras in 1917. Other bantam battalions included the 14th (Service) Battalion, Gloucestershire Regiment (West of England), and the 23rd (Service) Battalion, Manchester Regiment (8th City) raised in 1915 and sent to France in 1916. Eventually the whole of the 35th Division and most of the 40th Division, were formed from "Bantam" men, who were virtually annihilated during the Battles of the Somme and the Cambrai respectively. Heavy casualties, transfers to specialised Army tunneling companies and tank regiments, the introduction of conscription, and replacements by taller men, eventually led to Bantam units becoming indistinguishable from other British divisions.

== See also ==
- Category:Bantam battalions
- 143rd Battalion (British Columbia Bantams), CEF
- 216th Battalion (Bantams), CEF
