= Maricourt, Somme =

Maricourt
- Commune
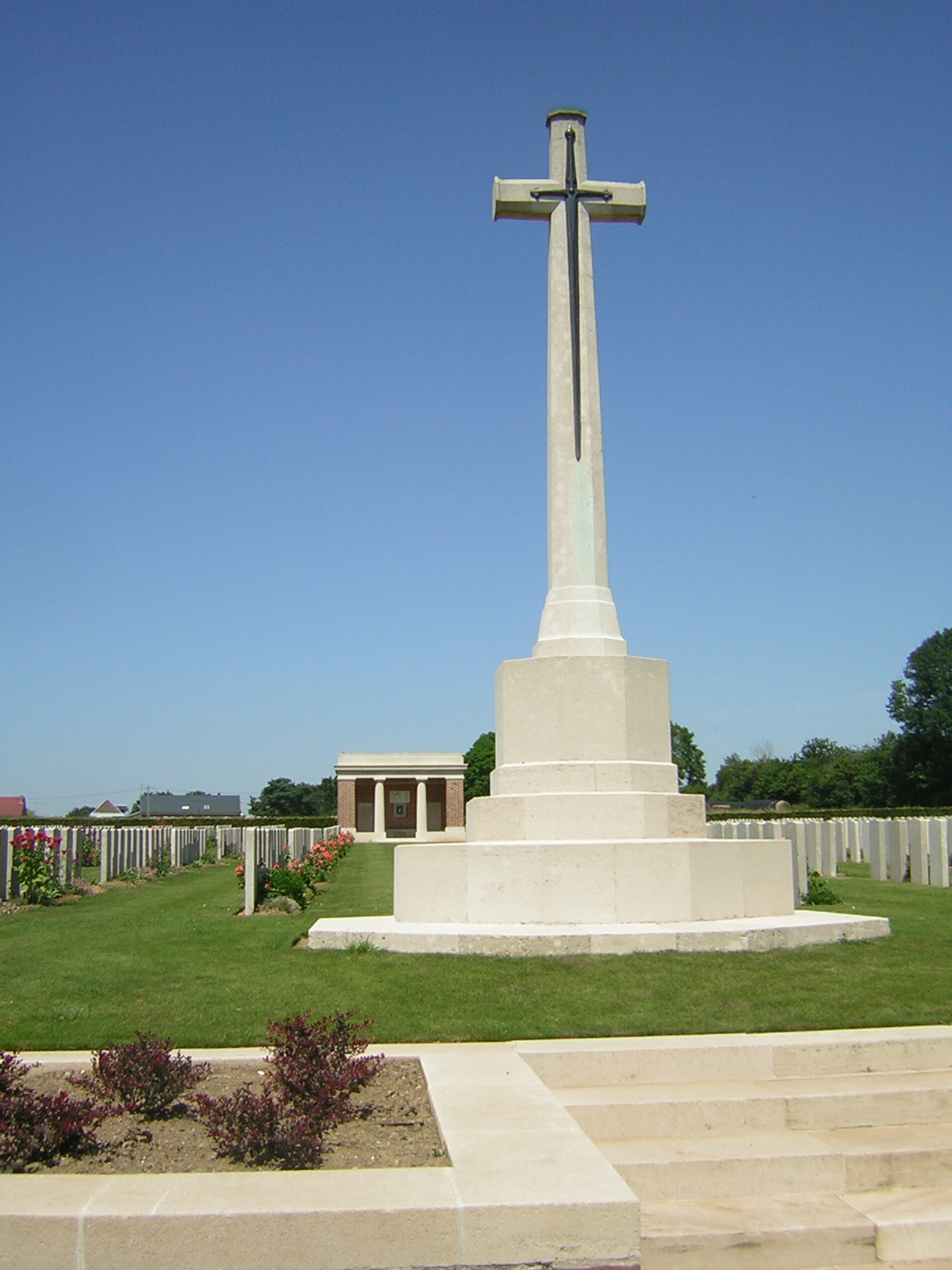
- The British war cemetery in Maricourt
- Location of Maricourt
- Location within France Location within Hauts-de-France
- Coordinates: 49°58′52″N 2°47′09″E
- Country: France
- Region: Hauts-de-France
- Department: Somme
- Arrondissement: Péronne
- Canton: Albert
- Intercommunality: Pays du Coquelicot

Government
  - Mayor (2020–2026): Bernard Guillemont
- Area^{1}: 7.52 km^{2} (2.90 sq mi)
- Elevation: 125 m (410 ft)
- Highest elevation: 129 m (423 ft)
- Lowest elevation: 55 m (180 ft)
- Population (2023): 184
  - Density: 24.5/km^{2} (63.4/sq mi)
- Time zone: UTC+01:00 (CET)
  - Summer (DST): UTC+02:00 (CEST)
- INSEE/Postal code: 80513 /80360
- ^{1} French Land Register data, which excludes lakes, ponds, glaciers > 1 km^{2} (0.386 sq mi or 247 acres) and river estuaries.

Maricourt (French pronunciation: [maʁikuʁ]) is a commune in the Somme department in Hauts-de-France in northern France.

== Geography ==
Maricourt is situated on the D938 road, some 30 miles (48 km) southeast of Amiens.

== Population ==
Historical population
Year	Pop.	±% p.a.
1968	187	—
1975	165	−1.77%
1982	146	−1.73%
1990	137	−0.79%
1999	145	+0.63%
2007	155	+0.84%
2012	170	+1.86%
2017	178	+0.92%
2023	184	+0.55%
Source: INSEE

== The Commonwealth Cemetery ==
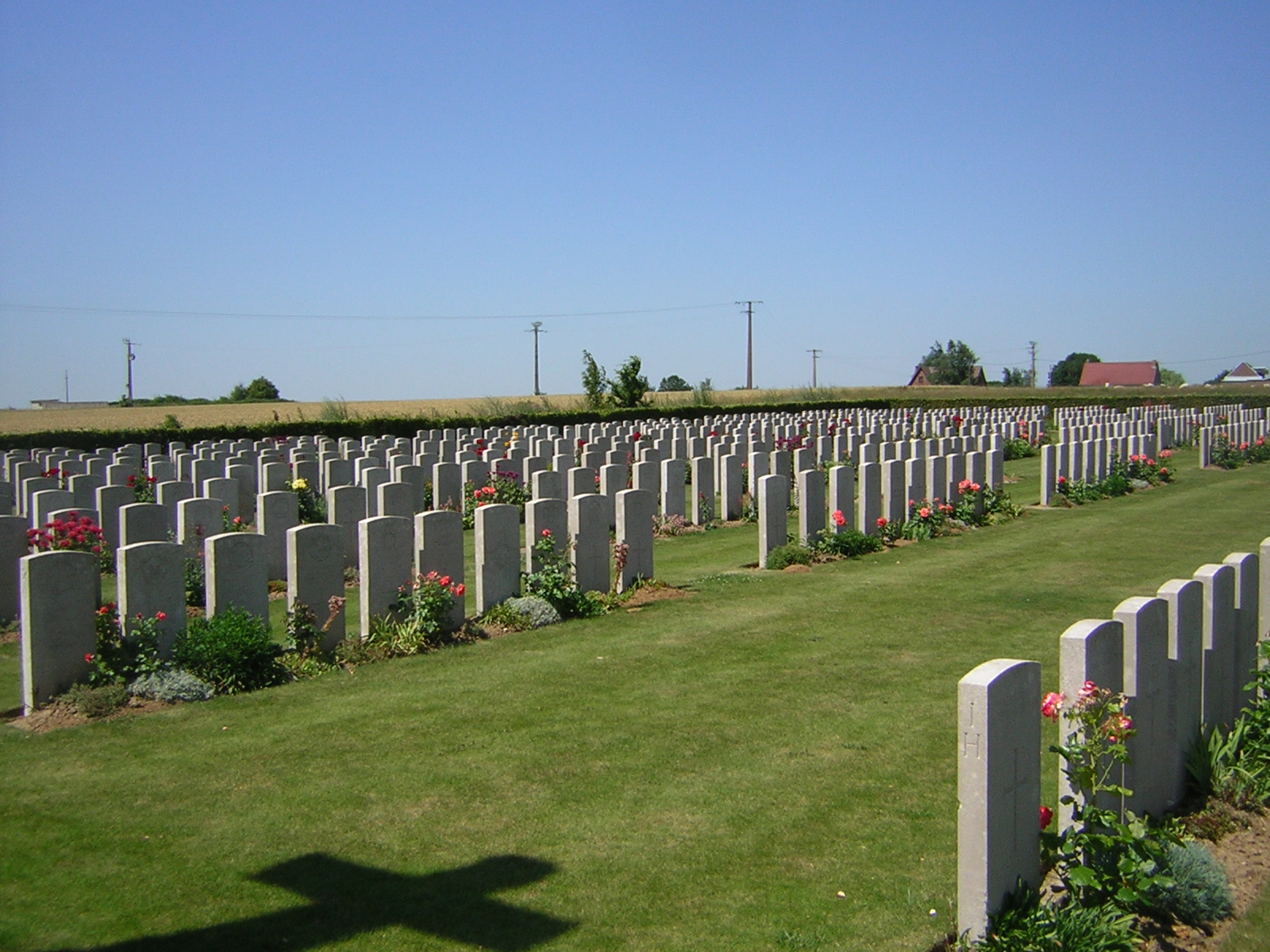
The Commonwealth Cemetery

== See also ==
- Communes of the Somme department
