= 47th Battalion (Australia) =

Australian Army infantry battalion

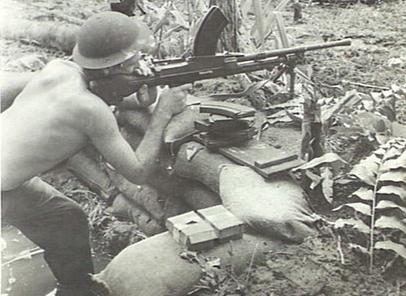
- A Bren gunner covers a patrol from the 47th Battalion on Bougainville, January 1945
- Active: 1916–1918; 1921–1946; 1948–1960
- Country: Australia
- Branch: Australian Army
- Type: Infantry
- Size: ~800–1,000 officers and men (Note: During the First World War, the authorised strength of an Australian infantry battalion was 1,023 men. By the start of the Second World War, it was 910 men all ranks, falling to just over 800 later in the war.)
- Part of: 12th Brigade, 4th Division; 29th Brigade, 3rd Division
- Colours: Brown over dark blue
- Engagements: First World War: Western Front; Second World War: New Guinea campaign; Bougainville campaign

Insignia
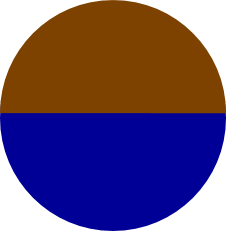
- Unit colour patch

The 47th Battalion was an infantry battalion of the Australian Army. It was originally raised in 1916 for service during the First World War. The battalion then took part in the fighting in the trenches of the Western Front in France and Belgium, before being disbanded in early 1918 to provide reinforcements for other Australian units that were suffering from a manpower shortage following the German spring offensive. In 1921, it was re-raised as a part-time unit of the Citizens Force, which later became the Militia. During this time it was based in south-east Queensland and in 1927 it became known as the "Wide Bay Regiment". During the Second World War the 47th Battalion took part in fighting in New Guinea and Bougainville, before being disbanded again in January 1946. Later, the battalion was re-raised before eventually being subsumed into the Royal Queensland Regiment in 1960.

== History ==
=== First World War ===
Originally raised in Egypt in 1916 during the First World War, the 47th Battalion was formed as part of the expansion of the Australian Imperial Force (AIF) that took place following the Gallipoli campaign. At this time it was decided that the AIF would be expanded from two divisions to four. In order to achieve this, new battalions were formed by splitting existing units and using a cadre formed from their experienced men along with freshly trained reinforcements sent from Australia. Taking its experienced men from the 15th Battalion and its new recruits from Queensland and Tasmania, the 47th Battalion formed part of the 12th Brigade, which was attached to the 4th Division. Following this, the battalion was transferred to France and Belgium where it fought in the trenches of the Western Front for the next two and half years.

During this time, the battalion fought in a number of significant battles, including the Battle of Pozières in 1916 and the Battles of Bullecourt, Messines and Passchendaele in 1917. Later, in early 1918, the battalion was heavily involved in turning back the German advance during the Spring Offensive, taking part in the fighting that took place around Dernancourt. It was during this fighting that one of the battalion's members, Sergeant Stanley McDougall earned the Victoria Cross, Australia's highest decoration for gallantry. After this, however, casualties amongst the units of the Australian Corps led to the order for three brigades to disband one of their battalions – the other two battalions disbanded at this time were the 36th and 52nd Battalions – and as a result of this the 47th Battalion was disbanded on 31 May 1918. During its service in the war, the battalion lost 661 men killed and 1,564 men wounded. Members of the battalion received the following decorations: one Victoria Cross, four Distinguished Service Orders and one Bar, one Member of the Order of the British Empire, 13 Military Crosses, 13 Distinguished Conduct Medal and one Bar, 86 Military Medals and four Bars, two Meritorious Service Medals, 16 Mentions in Despatches and two foreign awards. (Note: The Australian War Memorial source does not indicate what these foreign awards were specifically.) A total of 11 battle honours were awarded to the 47th Battalion for their involvement in the war; these were bestowed in 1927.

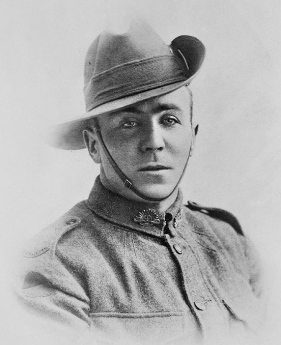
Stan McDougall, the 47th Battalion's sole Victoria Cross recipient

=== Inter-war years ===
In 1921, the decision was made to perpetuate the battle honours and traditions of the AIF by re-organising the units of the Citizens Force to adopt the numerical designations of their related AIF units. At this time the 47th Battalion was re-raised by the amalgamation of a number of previously existing Queensland Citizens Force units that had contributed personnel to the battalion during the war, with the main body of personnel coming from the 2nd Battalion, 47th Infantry Regiment. In keeping with its regional identity, depots were formed in a number of locations in the Wide Bay–Burnett region of south east Queensland, including Tiaro, Gympie, Murgon, Wondai, Kingaroy, Childers, Howard, and Bundaberg, with battalion headquarters located in Maryborough. In 1927, territorial titles were adopted by the units of the Citizens Force and as a result the battalion adopted the title of the "Wide Bay Regiment"; at the same time the battalion's motto – Defendere non Provocare was approved.

Initially, the strength of the part-time military in the early inter-war years was maintained by a mixture of voluntary and compulsory service, but in 1929, following the election of the Scullin Labor government, the compulsory training scheme was abolished and in its place a new system was introduced whereby the Citizens Forces would be maintained on a part-time, voluntary basis only. It was also renamed the "Militia" at this time. The decision to suspend compulsory training, coupled with the economic downturn of the Great Depression meant that the manpower of many Militia units dropped considerably and as a result the decision was made to amalgamate a number of units, although the 47th Battalion was not one of those chosen. During the inter-war years, the battle established alliances with the Loyal Regiment and the Edmonton Regiment.

=== Second World War ===
Following the outbreak of the Second World War, due to the provisions of the Defence Act (1903) which precluded deploying the Militia outside of Australian territory, the government decided to raise an all volunteer force for overseas service, known as the Second Australian Imperial Force (2nd AIF). As such while the Militia would provide a cadre for this force, its main role was to provide training to conscripts as part of the compulsory training scheme which was re-established in early 1940. During this time, the Militia were called up in cohorts for periods of continuous training lasting between 30 and 90 days and the 47th Battalion undertook a number of these camps early in the war. On 17 March 1941, however, as tensions were building in the Pacific, the battalion was mobilised for full-time war service. At the end of 1941 it was brigaded together with the 15th and 42nd Battalions to form the 29th Brigade.

Initially, the 29th Brigade was attached to the 5th Division and undertook garrison duties around Townsville in 1942 before deploying to Milne Bay in early 1943 to garrison Goodenough Island. They later took part in the landings at Tambu Bay before participating in the Salamaua–Lae campaign, helping to capture Lae from the Japanese. Finally, in 1944, after 18 months of service overseas the 47th Battalion returned to Australia with the rest of the brigade for training and reorganisation around Strathpine. It was around this time that the Australian Army began converting a number of its divisions over to the Jungle divisional establishment, including the units of the Militia 3rd and 5th Divisions. The battalion's final involvement in the war came when the 29th Brigade was transferred to the 3rd Division and sent to Bougainville in late 1944. On Bougainville the Australians had launched an aggressive campaign against the 40,000 Japanese on the island. (Note: At the time, Australian and Allied intelligence estimates actually placed the Japanese strength at around 17,000 men. It was only after the war that the inaccuracy of this figure was realised.) The Australian campaign on the island developed into three separate drives in the north, south and central sectors. In December 1944, the 47th Battalion was assigned to the southern sector, taking part in the 29th Brigade's advance from the Jaba River to Mawaraka. After this they were moved to the rear at Torokina for rest before returning to the take part in a second operation in July 1945 which saw them relieve the 15th Brigade and take part in the advance across the Mivo River.

Following the end of hostilities the 47th Battalion returned to Australia in December 1945 and was disbanded a month later in January 1946. During its service in the war, the battalion lost 67 men killed or died of various causes and another 147 wounded. Members of the battalion received the following decorations: one Officer of the Order of the British Empire, six Military Crosses, nine Military Medals and 21 Mentions in Despatches. The battalion received five battle honours for the Second World War in 1961.

=== Post Second World War ===
Following the war, Australia's part-time military force was re-raised in 1948 under the title of the Citizens Military Force. Around this time the 47th Battalion was re-formed with its headquarters around Maryborough. In 1960, when the Australian Army introduced the Pentropic divisional establishment, the 47th Battalion became a company-sized element of the 1st Battalion, Royal Queensland Regiment, known as 'D' Company (The Wide Bay Company). In 1965, the Army abandoned the Pentropic system and re-organised the units of the CMF in an effort to return to some of the traditional battalion identities. As a part of this, 'D' Company, 9th Battalion, Royal Queensland Regiment was formed from the Wide Bay Company. In 2011, an official history of the 47th Battalion was published by the Australian Army History Unit and Big Sky Publishing. Battle Scarred by Craig Deayton chronicles the battles and history of the 47th Battalion through France and Belgium.

The Regiment is also significant in the Wide Bay, with the school colours of Maryborough Grammar School, now Maryborough State High School, reflected in the brown and blue of the school’s colours. The retired regimental colours were presented to the school in a ceremony in 2017, where they continue to be presented in the school Administration.

== Battle honours ==
The 47th Battalion received the following battle honours: (Note: These battle honours are perpetuated today by the Royal Queensland Regiment.)

- First World War: Somme 1916–18, Pozières, Bullecourt, Messines 1917, Ypres 1917, Menin Road, Polygon Wood, Passchendaele, Ancre 1918, France and Flanders 1916–18, Egypt 1916.
- Second World War: Liberation of Australian New Guinea, Tambu Bay, Mawaraka, Mivo Ford, South-West Pacific 1943–45.

== Notes ==
Footnotes

Citations
