= George Franks =

British Army officer

Major-General Sir George Franks KCB
- Born: 16 October 1868
- Died: 12 October 1958 (aged 89)
- Military career
- Allegiance: United Kingdom
- Branch: British Army
- Service years: 1887–1938
- Rank: Major-General
- Unit: Royal Artillery
- Commands: 35th Division
- Conflicts: First World War
- Awards: Knight Commander of the Order of the Bath

Major-General Sir George McKenzie Franks KCB (16 October 1868 – 12 October 1958) was a senior British Army officer who commanded the 35th Division.

== Military career ==
Educated at Marlborough College and the Royal Military Academy, Woolwich, Franks was commissioned into the Royal Artillery on 23 July 1887.

He saw action in Egypt and Sudan for which he was awarded the Order of the Medjidie, 4th class on 10 May 1899 and the Order of Osmanieh, 4th class on 2 August 1900.

He was promoted from supernumerary major to major in February 1908, and was employed at the Staff College, Camberley as a professor, for which he was granted the temporary rank of lieutenant colonel while serving in this position.

He saw action during the First World War, where he was seconded and became assistant adjutant and quartermaster general of the 2nd Cavalry Division in November 1914. In February 1915 he was raised to the temporary rank of brigadier general and became a brigadier general, Royal Artillery. He was made a temporary major general on 18 December 1915 and became major general, Royal Artillery of the Second Army. He was appointed a Companion of the Order of the Bath (CB) on 1 January 1917. and became general officer commanding (GOC) of the 35th Division on 7 July 1917. He was promoted to substantive major general on 1 January 1918. He was replaced during the German Spring Offensive on 27 March, after he misinterpreted the verbal orders of Lieutenant General Walter Congreve, GOC XIII Corps, and directed a withdrawal from the line Albert–Bray-sur-Somme.

Franks went on to be General Officer Commanding, United Provinces District, India and, in that capacity, was advanced to Knight Commander of the Order of the Bath (KCB) in the 1927 Birthday Honours. He retired from the army on 20 October 1928.
