= List of battalions of the Cheshire Regiment =

This is a list of battalions of the Cheshire Regiment, which existed as an infantry regiment of the British Army from 1881 to 2007.

== Original composition ==
When the 22nd (Cheshire) Regiment of Foot became The Cheshire Regiment in 1881 under the Cardwell-Childers reforms of the British Armed Forces, seven pre-existent militia and volunteer battalions of Cheshire were integrated into the structure of the regiment. Volunteer battalions had been created in reaction to a perceived threat of invasion by France in the late 1850s. Organised as "rifle volunteer corps", they were independent of the British Army and composed primarily of the middle class.

Battalion	Formed	Formerly
Regular
1st	1688	1st Battalion, 22nd (Cheshire) Regiment of Foot
2nd	1858	2nd Battalion, 22nd (Cheshire) Regiment of Foot
Militia
3rd (Militia)	1853	1st Royal Cheshire Light Infantry Militia
4th (Militia)	1853	2nd Royal Cheshire Militia
Volunteers
1st Volunteer	1860	1st Cheshire Rifle Volunteer Corps
2nd (Earl of Chester's) Volunteer	1860	2nd Cheshire Rifle Volunteer Corps
3rd Volunteer	1860	3rd Cheshire Rifle Volunteer Corps
4th Volunteer	1860	4th Cheshire Rifle Volunteer Corps
5th Volunteer	1860	5th Cheshire Rifle Volunteer Corps

== Reorganisation ==
The Territorial Force (later Territorial Army) was formed in 1908, which the volunteer battalions joined, while the militia battalions transferred to the "Special Reserve". All volunteer battalions were renumbered to create a single sequential order. Also in 1908, the 4th (Militia) Battalion was one of the 23 infantry militia battalions to disband.

Battalion	Formerly
4th	1st Volunteer Battalion
5th (Earl of Chester's)	Amalgamation of 2nd (Earl of Chester's) and 3rd Volunteer Battalions
6th	4th Volunteer
7th	5th Volunteer

== First World War ==
The Cheshires fielded 38 battalions and lost 8,413 officers and other ranks during the course of the war. The regiment's territorial components formed duplicate second and third line battalions. As an example, the three-line battalions of the 4th Cheshires were numbered as the 1/4th, 2/4th, and 3/4th respectively, with the third line battalions, being redesignated reserve battalions in 1916. Many battalions of the regiment were formed as part of Secretary of State for War Lord Kitchener's appeal for an initial 100,000 men volunteers in 1914. They were referred to as the New Army or Kitchener's Army. The 13th, 15th, 16th, and 17th, New Army battalions, was referred to as a "Pals" battalion because it was predominantly composed of colleagues. The Volunteer Training Corps were raised with overage or reserved occupation men early in the war, and were initially self-organised into many small corps, with a wide variety of names. Recognition of the corps by the authorities brought regulation and as the war continued the small corps were formed into battalion sized units of the county Volunteer Regiment. In 1918 these were linked to county regiments.

Battalion	Formed	Served	Fate
Regular
1st	1688	Western Front	
2nd	1858	Western Front, Salonika	
Special Reserve
3rd (Reserve)	1853	Britain	
Territorial Force
1/4th	1860	Gallipoli, Western Front	See Inter-War
1/5th (Earl of Chester's)	1860	Western Front	See Inter-War
1/6th	1860	Western Front	See Inter-War
1/7th	1860	Gallipoli, Western Front	
2/4th	Birkenhead, September 1914	Britain	Absorbed by 2/7th Battalion, in December 1915
2/5th (Earl of Chester's)	Chester, November 1914	Britain	Disbanded, in April 1918
2/6th	Stockport, September 1914	Britain	Disbanded, in September 1917
2/7th	Macclesfield, October 1914	Britain	Disbanded, in March 1918
3/4th 4th (Reserve) Battalion, from April 1916	Birkenhead, March 1915	Britain	Disbanded, in 1919
3/5th (Earl of Chester's); 5th (Reserve) Battalion, from April 1916	Chester, March 1915	Britain	Absorbed by the 4th (Reserve) Battalion, in September 1916
3/6th 6th (Reserve) Battalion, from April 1916	Stockport, March 1915	Britain	Absorbed by the 4th (Reserve) Battalion, in September 1916
3/7th 7th (Reserve) Battalion, from April 1916	Macclesfield, March 1915	Britain	Absorbed by the 4th (Reserve) Battalion, in September 1916
23rd	Happisburgh, January 1917 from 46th Provisional Battalion (Territorial Force)	Western Front	Disbanded, in 1919
New Army
8th (Service)	Chester, August 1914	Gallipoli, Mesopotamia	Disbanded, in 1919
9th (Service)	Chester, September 1914	Western Front	Disbanded, in 1919
10th (Service)	Chester, September 1914	Britain	Absorbed by 15th Battalion, South Wales Borderers, in July 1918
11th (Service)	Chester, September 1914	Western Front	Disbanded, in August 1918
12th (Service)	Chester, September 1914	Western Front, Salonika	Disbanded, in 1919
13th (Service)	Port Sunlight, September 1914	Western Front	Disbanded, in February 1918
14th (Reserve)	Birkenhead, October 1914	Britain	Converted to 50th Training Reserve Battalion, in September 1916
15th (Service) (1st Birkenhead)	Birkenhead, November 1914	Western Front	Bantam battalion; disbanded, in 1919
16th (Service) (2nd Birkenhead)	Birkenhead, December 1914	Western Front	Bantam battalion; disbanded, in February 1918
17th (Reserve)	Bebington, August 1915	Western Front	Bantam battalion formed from depot companies of 16th and 17th (S) Bns; converted to 74th Reserve Bn, in September 1916
Others
18th (Labour)	Oldham, March 1916	Western Front	Became Nos. 56 and 57 Companies, Labour Corps, in April 1917
19th (Labour)	Oldham, April 1916	Western Front	Became Nos. 58 and 59 Companies, Labour Corps, in April 1917
20th (Labour)	Chester, June 1916	Western Front	Became Nos. 60 and 61 Companies, Labour Corps, in April 1917
21st (Labour)	Chester, August 1916	Western Front	Became Nos. 62 and 63 Companies, Labour Corps, in May 1917
22nd (Labour)	Chester, December 1916	Western Front	Became Nos. 64 and 65 Companies, Labour Corps, in April 1917
24th (Home Service)	Mundesley, April 1918	Britain	Disbanded, in 1919
1st Garrison	Chester, August 1915	Gibraltar	Disbanded, in 1919
2nd Garrison	Bebington, October 1915	Egypt & Palestine	Disbanded, in 1919
3rd (Home Service) Garrison	Ramsey, November 1915	Britain	Converted to 11th Battalion, Royal Defence Corps, in August 1917
51st (Graduated)	October 1917 from 213th Graduated Battalion	Ireland	Disbanded, in 1919
52nd (Graduated)	October 1917 from 221st Graduated Battalion	Ireland	Disbanded, in 1919
53rd (Young Soldier)	October 1917 from 62nd Training Reserve Battalion	Britain & Germany	Converted to service battalion, then absorbed into 9th Bn, in 1919
Volunteer Training Corps
1st Battalion (Altrincham) Cheshire Volunteer Regiment later the 1st Volunteer Battalion, Cheshire Regiment		Hale	Disbanded post war
2nd Battalion Cheshire Volunteer Regiment later the 2nd Volunteer Battalion, Cheshire Regiment		Birkenhead	Disbanded post war
3rd Battalion (Chester and Eddisbury) Cheshire Volunteer Regiment later the 3rd Volunteer Battalion, Cheshire Regiment		Chester	Disbanded post war
4th Battalion Cheshire Volunteer Regiment later the 4th Volunteer Battalion, Cheshire Regiment		Crewe	Disbanded post war
5th Battalion (East Cheshire) Cheshire Volunteer Regiment later the 5th Volunteer Battalion, Cheshire Regiment		Stalybridge	Disbanded post war
6th Battalion (Knutsford) Cheshire Volunteer Regiment later the 6th Volunteer Battalion, Cheshire Regiment		Wilmslow	Disbanded post war
7th Battalion Cheshire Volunteer Regiment later the 7th Volunteer Battalion, Cheshire Regiment		Macclesfield	Disbanded post war
8th Battalion Cheshire Volunteer Regiment		Northwich	Disbanded 1918
9th Battalion Cheshire Volunteer Regiment later the 8th Volunteer Battalion, Cheshire Regiment		Stockport	Disbanded post war
10th Battalion (Wirral) Cheshire Volunteer Regiment later the 9th Volunteer Battalion, Cheshire Regiment		Heswall	Disbanded post war
11th Battalion Cheshire Volunteer Regiment later the 10th Volunteer Battalion, Cheshire Regiment		Wallasey	Disbanded post war

== Inter-War ==
By 1920, all of the regiment's war-raised battalions had disbanded. The Special Reserve reverted to its militia designation in 1921, then to the Supplementary Reserve in 1924; however, its battalions were effectively placed in 'suspended animation'. As World War II approached, the Territorial Army was reorganised in the mid-1930s, many of its infantry battalions were converted to other roles, especially anti-aircraft.

Battalion	Fate
4th	Amalgamated with the 5th (Earl of Chester's) Battalion, to create the 4th/5th (Earl of Chester's) Battalion, in 1921
5th (Earl of Chester's)	Amalgamated with the 4th Battalion, to create the 4th/5th (Earl of Chester's) Battalion, in 1921
6th	Amalgamated with the Cheshire Brigade, RFA and Shropshire Battery, RHA, to form 6th Cheshire & Shropshire Medium Brigade, RGA, in February 1920.

== Second World War ==
The regiment's expansion during the Second World War was modest compared to 1914–1918. National Defence Companies were combined to create a new "Home Defence" battalion, In addition to this, 26 battalions of the Home Guard were affiliated to the regiment, wearing its cap badge, and also by 1944 one Heavy Anti Aircraft (HAA) battery, and three rocket batteries (Z Battery) forming the whole of the 22nd Anti Aircraft Regiment (Home Guard). Due to the daytime (or shift working) occupations of these men, the batteries required eight times the manpower of an equivalent regular battery. A number of Light Anti-Aircraft (LAA) troops were formed from the local battalions to defend specific points, such as factories.

Battalion	Formed	Served	Fate
Regular
1st	1688	North Africa, Malta, North West Europe	See Post-World War II
2nd	1858	France, North Africa, Sicily, North West Europe	See Post-World War II
Supplementary Reserve
3rd	1853		See Post-World War II
Territorial Army
4th as a duplicate of 5th (Earl of Chester's) Battalion	1939	France, Britain	
5th (Earl of Chester's) redesignation of 4th/5th (Earl of Chester's)	1921	Britain	See Post-World War II
6th as a duplicate of 7th Battalion	1939	North Africa, Italy, North West Europe	See Post-World War II
7th	1860	France, Sicily, Italy	
30th (Home Defence); 8th, from 1941	1939	Italy	Disbanded, in 1946

Home Guard
Battalion	Headquarters	Formation Sign (dark blue on khaki)	Battalion	Headquarters	Formation Sign (dark blue on khaki)
1st	Altrincham	CH 1	2nd	Altrincham	CH 2
3rd	Knutsford	CH 3	4th	Birkenhead	CH 4
5th	Broxton	CH 5	6th	Chester	CH 6
7th	Crewe	CH 7	8th	Congleton	CH 8
9th	Macclesfield	CH 9	10th	Wilmslow	CH 10
11th	Middlewich	CH 11	12th	Northwich	CH 12
13th	Sandiway	CH 13	14th	Tarporley	CH 14
15th	Runcorn	CH 15	16th	Wallasey	CH 16
17th	Haswell	CH 17	18th	Ellesmere Port	CH 18
19th	Shotton	CH 19	20th	Great Sutton	CH 20
21st	Bebington	CH 21	22nd (28 G.P.O.)	Chester	CH 22
23rd	Sale	CH 23	24th	Nantwich	CH 24
35th	Staley Bridge	CH 35	36th	Hyde	CH 36
37th	Romiley	CH 37	38th	Stockport	CH 38
39th	Cheadle	CH 39			
Home Guard Anti-Aircraft units
Formation Sign (dark blue on khaki)	Headquarters or Location	AA Formation and Designation	Formation Sign (dark blue on khaki)	Headquarters or Location	AA Formation and Designation
CH 71	Birkenhead	71st Battery, 22nd Anti-Aircraft Regiment (Home Guard) (HAA)	CH 101	South Birkenhead	132nd Battery, 22nd Anti-Aircraft Regiment (Home Guard) (Z battery)
CH 102	Birkenhead	214th Battery, 22nd Anti-Aircraft Regiment (Home Guard) (Z battery)	CH 103	Wallasey	104th Battery, 22nd Anti-Aircraft Regiment (Home Guard) (Z battery)
CH 1	Ringway, (Fairy Aviation Co. Ltd)	A Troop LAA	CH 2	Altrinchan, (Churchill Machine Tool Co. Ltd)	A Troop LAA
CH 7	Crewe, (Rolls-Royce Ltd)	A Troop LAA	CH 10	Woodford (A.V. Roe & Co. Ltd)	A, B Troops LAA
CH 10	Ringway (A.V. Roe & Co. Ltd)	C Troop LAA	CH 11	Radway Green, (Royal Ordnance Factory)	A, B Troops LAA
CH 12	Plumley, Northwich, (British Ethyl Corporation Ltd)	A Troop LAA	CH 12	Wade, Northwich, (Ministry of Supply Factory)	B Troop LAA
CH 18	Ellesmere Port	A Troop LAA	CH 38	Stockport, (Fairy Aviation Co. Ltd)	A Troop LAA

== Post-World War II ==
In the immediate post-war period, the army was significantly reduced: nearly all infantry regiments had their first and second battalions amalgamated and the Supplementary Reserve disbanded.

Battalion	Fate
1st	Placed in suspended animation, in July 1948
2nd	Renumbered as the 1st Battalion, in July 1948
5th (Earl of Chester's)	Placed in suspended animation, in 1947
6th	Disbanded, in 1947

When the TAVR was established in 1967, the size of the territorial was greatly reduced, with most infantry battalions being reduced to a company. However, the Cheshire regiment did not receive the same fate; instead both the 4th and 7th battalions disbanded and were concurrently reconstituted as two units:

- A Company (Cheshire), Mercian Volunteers
- 4th/7th (T) Battalion, Cheshire Regiment

However, only four years later in 1971, the 4th/7th Battalion was reduced to E Company (Cheshire), Mercian Volunteers. In 1988, a Territorial battalion dedicated to the regiment, was once again raised, namely 3rd (V) Battalion.

== Last years ==
Under Delivering Security in a Changing World, the Cheshire Regiment was due to amalgamate with the Staffordshire Regiment and Worcestershire and Sherwood Foresters Regiment, to form a new large regiment- The Mercian Regiment.

Battalion	Fate
1st	Became 1st Battalion, Mercian Regiment in August 2007
3rd (V)	Became B and D (Cheshire) Companies, King's and Cheshire Regiment, in July 1999. And then B Coy, 4th Battalion Mercian Regiment in 2007.
