= Arthur Marindin =

British Army officer

Major-General Arthur Marindin CB DSO
- Born: 18 August 1868
- Died: 28 June 1947 (aged 78)
- Military career
- Allegiance: United Kingdom
- Branch: British Army
- Service years: 1891–1919
- Rank: Major-General
- Unit: Black Watch
- Commands: 35th Division
- Conflicts: First World War
- Awards: Companion of the Order of the Bath; Distinguished Service Order

Major-General Arthur Henry Marindin, CB, DSO (18 August 1868 – 28 June 1947) was a senior British Army officer who commanded the 35th Division.

== Military career ==
After attending the Royal Military College, Sandhurst, Marindin was commissioned as a second lieutenant into the Black Watch (Royal Highlanders) on 7 November 1891, and was promoted to lieutenant on 16 February 1896.

He served in South Africa during the early part of the Second Boer War from 1899 to 1900, as a special service officer. First employed in Base Commandant′s Office, he was then on Transport duty, then served as Staff Officer (graded Staff Captain from 29 April 1900) to Rest Camp, Bloemfontein, and subsequently to the Officer Commanding troops at Bloemfontein and Southern lines of communication. He was promoted to captain while in South Africa, on 21 October 1900.

Following the end of the war and his return to Britain, Marindin was in January 1903 seconded from his regiment and appointed as an nstructor at the Staff College, Camberley. On 14 November 1905 he succeeded Lieutenant Colonel Edward Perceval as a deputy assistant quartermaster general (DAQMG) at the War Office.

He was promoted to major on 24 May 1910.

He saw action during the First World War. He was appointed acting general officer commanding (GOC) of the 35th Division on a temporary basis on 27 March 1918: that division was involved in a series of fighting withdrawals since being committed to battle on 25 March near Cléry-sur-Somme, some 13 miles (21 km) east of Dernancourt. He was confirmed in that post on a substantive basis on 7 April. He was promoted on 3 June 1918 to brevet colonel.

Marindin went on to command 3rd Highland Brigade as part of British Army of the Rhine in March 1919.

He was appointed a Companion of the Distinguished Service Order in the 1918 New Year Honours and a Companion of the Order of the Bath in the 1919 Birthday Honours.

In January 1932 he was made honorary colonel of the 6th/7th Battalion, Black Watch, a Territorial Force (TF) unit.

== Sources ==
- Davson, H. M. (2003) [1926]. The History of the 35th Division in the Great War (Naval & Military Press ed.). London: Sifton Praed & Co. Ltd. ISBN 978-1-84342-643-1.
