= 23rd (Service) Battalion, Manchester Regiment (8th City) =

- Active: 24 November 1914–16 February 1918
- Allegiance: United Kingdom
- Branch: New Army
- Type: Bantam battalion
- Role: Infantry
- Size: One Battalion
- Part of: 35th Division
- Garrison/HQ: Manchester
- Nicknames: 'Manchester Bantams' 'Bobs' Own'
- Patron: Lord Mayor and City of Manchester
- Engagements: Battle of the Somme; German Retreat to the Hindenburg Line; Battle of Passchendaele

The 23rd (Service) Battalion, Manchester Regiment (8th City) was a Bantam battalion recruited in 1914 as part of 'Kitchener's Army' from men who were below the normal minimum height required by the British Army. It served in 35th Division, which was entirely composed of bantam battalions, and first saw action at the Battle of the Somme. The Bantam concept did not survive the losses of the Somme, and had to be abandoned when the battalions became filled with reinforcements who were not simply undersized but actually unfit for service. In 1917 the 23rd Manchesters became a conventional infantry battalion and saw further action during the German retreat to the Hindenburg Line and at the Battle of Passchendaele before being broken up early in 1918 to provide reinforcements to other units.

== Background ==
On 6 August 1914, less than 48 hours after Britain's declaration of war, Parliament sanctioned an increase of 500,000 men for the Regular British Army, and the newly appointed Secretary of State for War, Earl Kitchener of Khartoum issued his famous call to arms: 'Your King and Country Need You', urging the first 100,000 volunteers to come forward. This group of six divisions with supporting arms became known as Kitchener's First New Army, or 'K1'. The flood of volunteers overwhelmed the ability of the army to absorb and organise them, and by the time the Fifth New Army (K5) was authorised on 10 December 1914, many of the units were being organised as 'Pals battalions' under the auspices of mayors and corporations of towns up and down the country.

However, a large number of otherwise medically fit volunteers were turned away because they did not meet the minimum height requirement of the prewar Regular Army, of 5 feet 3 inches (160 cm). Alfred Bigland, the Member of Parliament for Birkenhead, persuaded Kitchener that this pool of potential manpower should be tapped, and he was given authority to raise a battalion of 'Bantams' (named after the small but pugnacious fighting cock). Three Bantam battalions were quickly raised at Birkenhead for the Cheshire Regiment, many of them coal miners who had travelled long distances to enlist, and the scheme spread to other areas. The War Office (WO) authorised each military district to recruit a battalion, attached to whichever regimental depot had sufficient capacity.

== Recruitment ==
The Lord Mayor and City of Manchester had already raised five 'City' battalions of Manchester Pals for K5, but the raisers knew they were turning away a lot of men on grounds of height. D.E. Anderson, chairman of the North Western Branch of the National Service League (NSL) pointed this out to the WO on 24 November, and the same evening the Lord Mayor received a telegram authorising him to raise a Bantam battalion. By then the NSL had collected the names of 1208 would-be bantams and the first recruit was attested next day. There was a race for recruits between the bantams and the 6th and 7th City battalions, which were also being enlisted at Manchester Town Hall. Anderson had proposed naming the battalion 'Bobs' Own' after the popular Field Marshal Earl Roberts, who was short of stature (and president of the NSL), and had died earlier in the month. In the event the Manchester Bantams were formally designated the 23rd (Service) Battalion, Manchester Regiment (8th City).

== Training ==
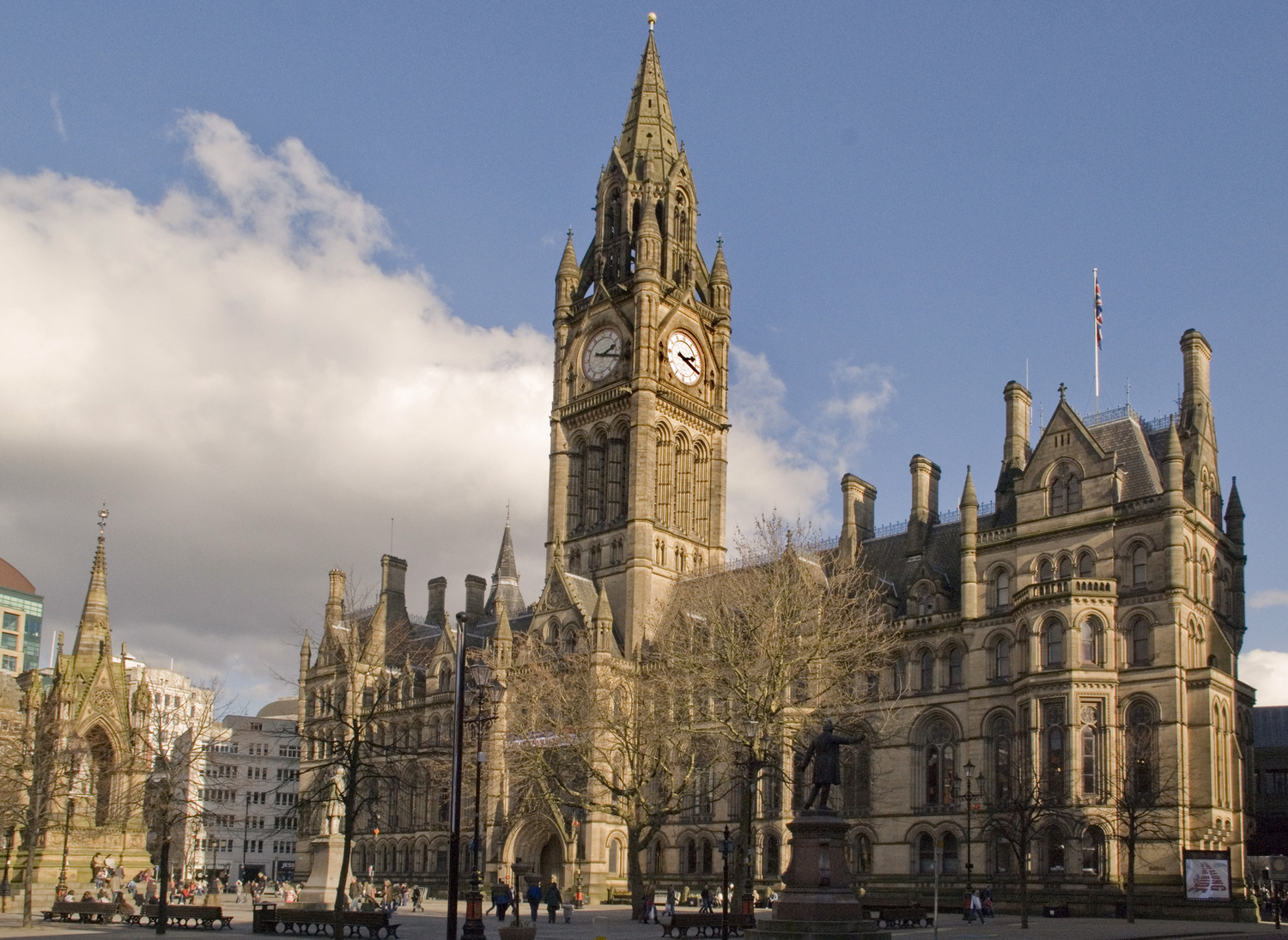
Manchester Town Hall, where the City battalions were enlisted.

The new battalion was completed and paraded for the first time on 4 December at the Manchester Artillery Drill Hall in Hyde Road, Ardwick. On 10 December 1914 the 20th–23rd (S) Battalions of the Manchesters (5th–8th City battalions) were assigned to 126th Brigade of 42nd Division. Huts were being erected in Heaton Park to house the City battalions, but these were inadequate for eight battalions, and the end of December 126th Bde began moving out to Morecambe on the Lancashire coast. The 23rd Manchesters entrained at Manchester Exchange railway station on 2 January 1915, and were comfortably billeted in Morecambe's seaside boarding houses, with battalion headquarters (HQ) at the Alhambra Theatre. The men had still not received their uniforms (temporary blue uniforms with dark grey overcoats were supplied by the Co-operative Wholesale Society), but training could get under way. Since December the 23rd Manchesters had been temporarily commanded by Lieutenant-Colonel Walter Cook, a retired officer of the Indian Army. In January he was replaced by Major Sir Henry Blyth Hill, 6th Baronet, a younger Reserve officer (he had served at the Battle of Omdurman) who had been appointed second-in-command of the 10th Royal Inniskilling Fusiliers (Derry) on the outbreak of war and was promoted to take over 23rd Manchesters. In March 126th Bde returned to Heaton Park for an inspection by Lord Kitchener, though the men were still clothed in a mixture of blue and khaki and many still did not have rifles.

On 27 April 1915 126th Bde was renumbered 91st Bde and it was moved to a new 30th Division entirely composed of Liverpool and Manchester Pals battalions. However, in May the 23rd Manchester was transferred to the 35th Division which was going to be composed of Bantam battalions. The battalion was assigned to 104th Bde, in which it was brigaded with the 17th (1st South-East Lancashire), 18th (2nd South-East Lancashire) and later the 20th (4th Salford) service battalions of the Lancashire Fusiliers (LF), all bantams.

While the rest of the Manchester City battalions left to join 30th Division in April, the 23rd Manchesters remained at Morecambe until June 1915 when it went to Masham in North Yorkshire to join 104th Bde camped at Roomer Common. Here training in musketry, entrenching, and larger-scale exercises were undertaken. In August 35 Division moved by rail to Salisbury Plain for final intensive training, with the infantry at Tidworth where 23rd Manchesters went into No 1 Parkhouse Camp. In June Lt-Col Hill had been transferred to the 19th Manchesters and in September Lt-Col R.P. Smith of the Devonshire Regiment took over command. In December the division received orders to prepare for service in Egypt, and all ranks were issued with tropical uniforms. It was unkindly said that the 'Bantams' on Salisbury Plain in their oversized pith helmets resembled overgrown mushrooms. However, the division's destination was shortly afterwards changed to the Western Front and the pith helmets were exchanged for caps and gas masks. Embarkation for France began on 28 January 1916; most of 104th Bde sailed from Southampton and landed at Le Havre on 29 January, but 23rd Manchesters crossed from Folkestone to Boulogne on 30 January. By 6 February the division had completed its concentration east of Saint-Omer.

== Service ==
Once in France the brigade continued training, with particular emphasis on 'bombing' and machine guns. In late February the units went in to the line in the Neuve-Chapelle sector alongside the more experienced 38th (Welsh) Division for instruction in Trench warfare. The Bantams were each provided with two sandbags to place on the firestep so that they could stand on them to see over the parapet of the trench. The units began to suffer their first few casualties. On 7 March 35 Division took responsibility for its own section of the line and the battalions began a routine of alternating periods between the front line, reserve and rest, with continual work details. While in the front line they carried out frequent trench raids. On 14 May the second-in-command, Maj J.F. Bannatyne, who had been in temporary command, was mortally wounded by shellfire. On 28 May Lt-Col Smith was removed from command on grounds of ill-health and replaced by Maj Eustace Lockhart Maxwell, an officer of the Indian Army (11th King Edward's Own Lancers (Probyn's Horse)) and brother of the Victoria Cross winner Francis Aylmer Maxwell. Maxwell had been serving with the bantams of 19th Durham Light Infantry in 106th Bde.

=== Somme ===
The BEF had been preparing for that summer's 'Big Push' (the Battle of the Somme), which was launched on 1 July. 35th Division had been in rest billets at Béthune since 19 June, and it entrained on the night of 2/3 July to join Fourth Army in the Somme sector, with 104th Bde billeted at Bouquemaison, then at Hem-Hardinval. On 6 July it began moving up close to the line in motor buses, with 104th Bde in Aveluy Wood, Morlancourt and 'Happy Valley'. 35th Division was in reserve for the Battle of Bazentin Ridge on 15 July, but although its 105th and 106th Bdes were sent forward, 104th Brigade was not called upon. However, during the night of 19/20 July W and X Companies of 23rd Manchesters struggled forward through darkness and shelling in the Trônes Wood sector, arriving at 04.55 to hold the trench just as 15th Sherwood Foresters (105th Bde), attempted to capture Maltz Horn Farm in front. One company of the Foresters reached the German trench but were driven out and the whole battalion suffered severe casualties; the remnants dribbled back through the Manchesters. The French 153rd Division to the right had made some progress, so a new attempt had to be made to protect their flank. 23rd Manchesters were ordered to renew the attack at 11.35. At 10.45 the two companies already in the line were pulled back from the front trench before the artillery bombardment began at 11.05. At this point Y and Z Companies had still not arrived after their forced march. At 11.35 W and X Companies went 'over the top' in eight waves with no clear idea of their direction or objective. As the other two companies arrived, one was sent to support the attack, the other to hold the trench. The British line was already under intense enemy shellfire. The Manchesters reached the opposing trench, but there was no cover from the German artillery and machine guns, and they were driven out again with serious casualties. Those who could retired to their trenches, which were subjected to intense enemy bombardment. The attack was over by 12.00. In this hastily planned attack the 23rd Manchesters had lost 9 officers and 192 other ranks (ORs); Lt-Col Maxwell was among the casualties, having been the first man over the parapet carrying a rifle and bayonet. He was reported as missing, believed killed. Afterwards, the commander of 153rd French Division told Maj-Gen Reginald Pinney of 35th Division that several of his observation posts had watched the attack of the 23rd Manchesters with admiration; 'It was splendid, as on parade, but they had no chance on the front face of the hill'. Pinney himself wrote 'The best type of Bantams done in'.

Threatened by a German counter-attack, the survivors of the two battalions tried to put their battered trenches into some sort of defensible shape. Luckily no counter-attack followed, and they were relieved that night, going back to the Talus Boisé, which was heavily bombarded with gas shells next morning. Major Leighton Stevens of the Worcestershire Regiment was promoted to command 23rd Manchesters. The battalion returned to hold the front line, suffering a steady trickle of casualties. On 24 July the battalion's positions were heavily shelled and it had to put up the 'SOS' signal calling for immediate artillery support. On 30 July 30th Division attacked Guillemont through 104th Bde's positions, parties of 23rd Manchesters carrying ammunition forward for the Manchester Pals of 90th Bde. This attack also failed, and 23rd Manchesters suffered numerous casualties. 104th Brigade then held the line under continual shellfire until it was relieved. It went back to Happy Valley and then to rest billets west of Amiens on 5 August.

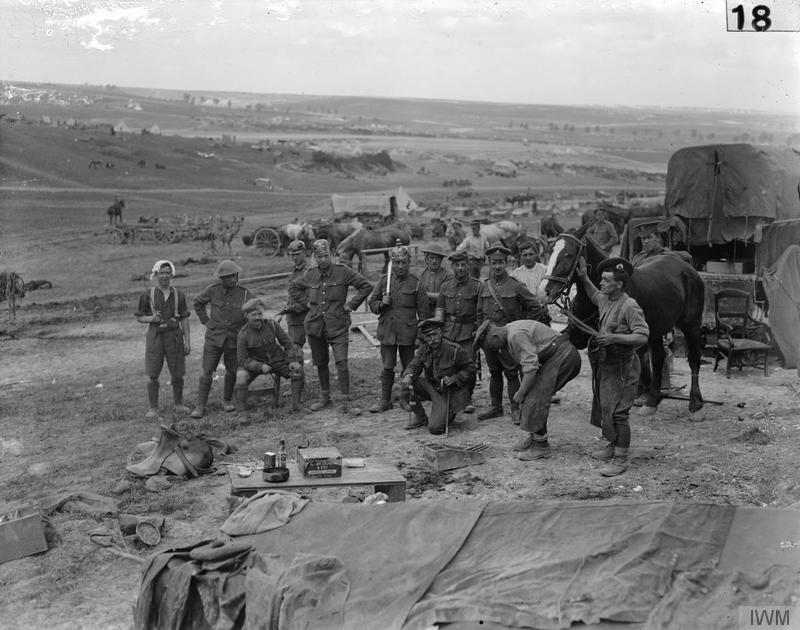
Encampments in 'Happy Valley', July 1916.

On the night of 19/20 August 104th Bde returned to the Maltz Horn Farm trenches, with 23rd Manchesters in the newly captured 'Lonely Trench'. This badly battered position was the extreme right of the British line until 18th and 20th LF took over from the neighbouring French division two nights later. While 105th Bde carried out a further attack towards Guillemont on 21 August, 104th Bde consolidated and slightly advanced its line, 23rd Manchesters digging a new position ('Bantam Trench') in advance of Lonely Trench. The brigade also pushed forward by means of patrols and small raids. Lieutenant M.H. Rose of 23rd Manchesters picked his way over No man's land into the enemy trench without being challenged, and after dark he led 40 men back to raid the trench, bombing dugouts and bringing back a captured machine gun (which was presented to the city of Manchester as a trophy). The battalion was relieved on 22/23 August and went back to Citadel camp in Happy Valley. They returned to the line on 24 August to support an advance towards Falfemont Farm by 17th LF alongside a French attack. The limited attack was a success, and the divisional pioneers (19th Northumberland Fusiliers) linked up 17th LF's new position on the southern slope of Falfemont Farm ridge with 23rd Manchesters' new trench. 35th Division was then relieved on 26 August, 104th Bde going back to Citadel camp, before entraining on 30 August to join Third Army in the Arras area to the north.

=== End of the Bantams ===
35th Division's formation sign after 'de-Bantamisation'.

The 23rd Manchesters never really recovered from the attack of 20 July 1916. By the end of the year the battalion had suffered total casualties of 7 officers killed and 19 wounded, 85 ORs killed, 424 wounded, and 25 missing, the highest loss rate in 35th Division.

As early as August Maj-Gen Pinney was complaining of the poor physique of the reinforcements he was being sent: the 23rd Manchesters' were particularly bad. Pinney wanted a meeting with General Headquarters to discuss the future of the bantams. On 8 December his successor (Maj-Gen Herman Landon) complained that the replacement drafts he had received were not of the same tough physical standard as the original bantams but were undeveloped, unfit men from the towns. A subsequent medical inspection rejected 1439 men of the division and a second inspection removed another batch, bringing the total to 2784. These men were mainly sent to the Labour Corps. Their places were filled with men transferred from disbanded Yeomanry Cavalry regiments; these had to be quickly retrained as infantry and a divisional depot was formed for the purpose. 23rd Manchesters received 171 men of average height while 161 others were 'combed out' as unfit. Original bantams who passed the medical inspection remained in place. The 35th Division was officially 'de-Bantamised' on 22 January 1917 and replaced its 'Bantam Cock' divisional sign with a circle of seven 5s.

=== Arras ===
On arrival at Arras in September 1916, the 23rd Manchesters set about cleaning and strengthening the ramshackle trenches they had taken over from French troops (including raising the firesteps so the bantams could fire over the parapet). Shelling, mortaring, trench raids, mining and gas cloud releases were common on this front; 23rd Manchesters attempted a raid on 15/16 September, but the raiders were held up by uncut barbed wire. By the end of November the battalion was working on railway construction, then in December provided working parties in Arras for 9th (Scottish) Division. On 4 January 1917 the battalion transferred 7 officers and 189 ORs to the Heavy Branch of the Machine Gun Corps (predecessor of the Tank Corps) and during the month received three drafts (totalling 324 men) of average height. On 24 January a further 176 unfit men were transferred out, 13 (Note: Possibly ex-miners.) to 181st Tunnelling Company, Royal Engineers, the rest to 25th Labour Company and 30th Infantry Base Depot.

=== Hindenburg Line ===
35th Division was transferred south at the beginning of February, 104th Bde reaching Naours after a series of marches. Here training in new infantry tactics was carried out. (Note: Following the General Staff training manual SS 143, Instructions for the Training of Platoons for Offensive Action, issued 14 February 1917.) The brigade then entrained on 17 February to take over positions from the French facing Chaulnes at the southern end of the old Somme battlefield. 23rd Manchesters went into the line at Lihons, finding the trenches flooded and almost uninhabitable. Cases of frostbite and Trench foot were common, and the British front and support lines were heavily bombarded on 23 February. On 26 February the battalion was relieved and went back to the Divisional Reserve Camp, where it resumed training. It returned to the line in the Chilly sub-sector in a snowstorm on 6 March. The routine of patrols and raids was resumed. After a further tour of duty at Chilly, the battalion was withdrawn to Rosières on 16 March to begin preparations for a diversionary attack to assist a French attack planned for the next day.

However, the German retreat to the Hindenburg Line (Operation Alberich) began in this sector on 16 March. The battalion followed up, occupying cellars at Maricourt on 17 March, then moving through Chilly (18 March) and Parvillers (19 March), before 104th Bde was attached to 32nd Division to work on road repairs across the area devastated by the Germans.

After three weeks of roadbuilding, 35th Division was shifted towards St Quentin, where the Hindenburg Line ran in front of the town. On 11 April it took over newly dug trenches at Maissemy facing the German positions. The positions were not completely settled, and there was considerable patrolling and raiding. In the early hours of 16 April 23rd Manchesters and 20th LF sent a large raiding party into the village of Pontruet under cover of an artillery and machine gun barrage, only to find the village abandoned. The Manchesters then did another week of roadmaking before returning to the line behind Bihecourt on 23 April. Next day the neighbouring 59th (2nd North Midland) Division attacked, and 23rd Manchesters established a post at 'Lone Tree' on the high ground north of Pontru. On 25 April the battalion sent a patrol to a crater the Germans had blown in the crossroads at Ste Helene and waited for the German night outpost to arrive. Having ambushed the German party, the patrol obtained identifications of the enemy units and got away without casualties. The place was afterwards known as 'Fisher Crater' after the officer who led the patrol. A larger raid on 27 April was less successful. After a spell out of the line, the 23rd Manchesters returned to carry out another raid on 5 May, against the woods north of Pontru that 59th Division had been unable to capture. An attacking party of 5 officers and 159 ORs went out against the north-west end of the wood at 02.30 under cover of an artillery barrage, while a second group of 1 officer and 30 ORs with Lewis guns and grenades staged a diversion at the south-west end. The diversion achieved its aim and the main party entered the wood against only slight resistance. They bombed all the dugouts and shelters, took prisoners, and withdrew at 03.15, leaving 17th LF to occupy the wood. The wood was named after Lt Hugh Somerville, who led the party and was awarded the Military Cross. Somerville Wood was fought over several times in the following days. 23rd Manchesters were relieved on 15 May and went back to camp behind Vermand.

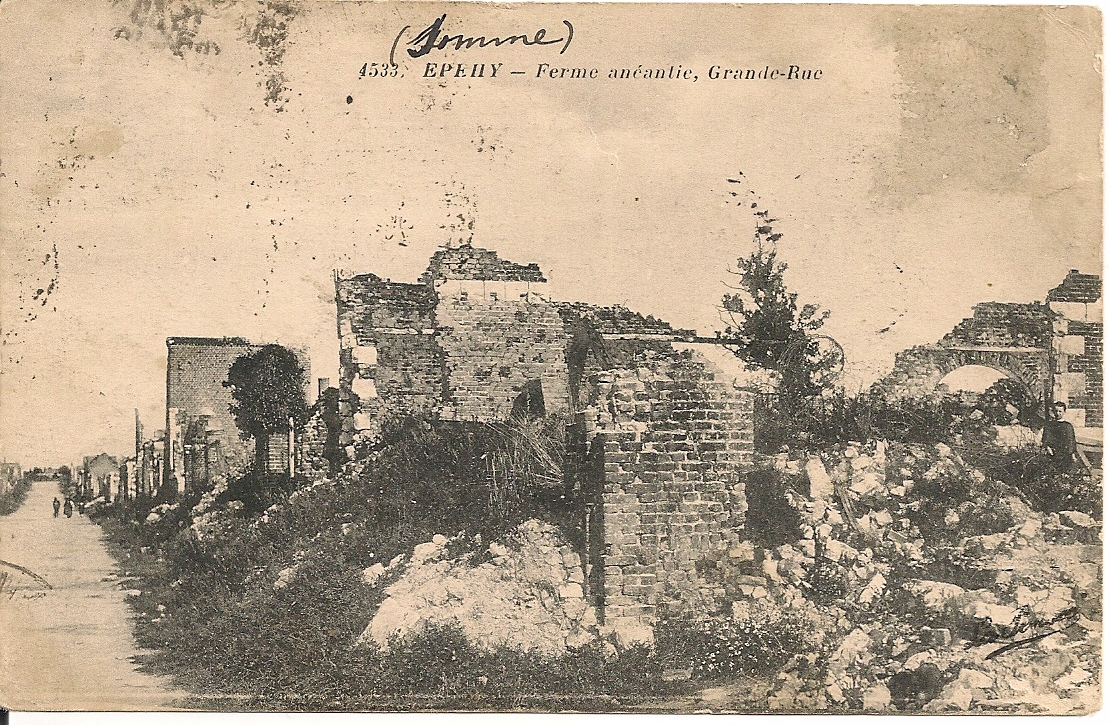
The ruins of Épehy.

On 21 May the battalion marched to billets in Péronne, then camped outside the battered town, providing working parties. On 2 June 35 Division shifted a few miles north to Gauche Wood sector near Villers-Guislain, where the defences were not continuous trenches but a line of detached posts facing the Hindenburg Line. While out of the front line battalions worked on wiring and improving the chain of outposts and in digging a 'Brown Line' behind. It was a quiet sector, but raiding was common, the 23rd Manchesters being attacked on 30 June. On 2 July the battalion moved into divisional reserve at Templeux-la-Fosse, where it spent two weeks training. When it returned to the front, 35th Division had moved to Épehy, where the front line positions sloping down towards the Hindenburg Line along the St Quentin Canal had to be strengthened. Both sides carried out raids. On 29 July 23rd Manchesters raided 'Hawk Trench' an enemy advanced post: no live Germans were found in it after the short intense British barrage.

Part of 35th Division was taken out of the line to prepare for an attack on a disputed piece of high ground known as the 'Knoll'. After 105th and 106th Bdes had captured the Knoll, 104th Bde's role would be to make a diversionary attack on Hawk Trench and 'Canal Trench'. The two battalions chosen (23rd Manchesters and 17th LF) were relieved on the night of 4/5 August and went to Gurlu Wood to train for the attack. The division attacked the Knoll on 19 August with heavy artillery support and captured its objectives in 15 minutes. That night the 23rd Manchesters and 17th LF went into the line, and early on 21 August the attacking parties formed up to launch their planned raid at 04.25. Unfortunately, the enemy launched a counter-attack on the Knoll at 04.00, and in the exchanges of shellfire 23rd Manchesters' parties suffered severe casualties before they set off. To keep the raid secret, the artillery had not been firing to cut the enemy wire, relying on the barrage in front of the attackers to do this. However, the wire was thicker than anticipated and the attackers were delayed while cutting through it, so that the barrage had already lifted off the enemy trenches before the attackers reached them. The Germans were able to man the parapet and a close-range fight broke out with rifles and bombs. The Manchesters and Fusiliers fought their way into the first trench and attacked the second, bombing the dugouts, but did not have time to finish the job before being recalled at 04.55. Afterwards 104th Bde took over manning the strongpoint known as the 'Birdcage'. Unfortunately, the British heavy artillery left for other duties, and without its support 106th Bde were unable to hold the Knoll against a heavy German counter-attack on 30 August.

23rd Manchesters remained in the line, improving positions at the Birdcage, until 6 September. It then spent most of September providing working parties behind the lines. At the end of the month it marched to Péronne and entrained for Hauteville, west of Arras. Here the division began training in preparation for a move to Ypres Salient where the Third Ypres Offensive had been raging for two months.

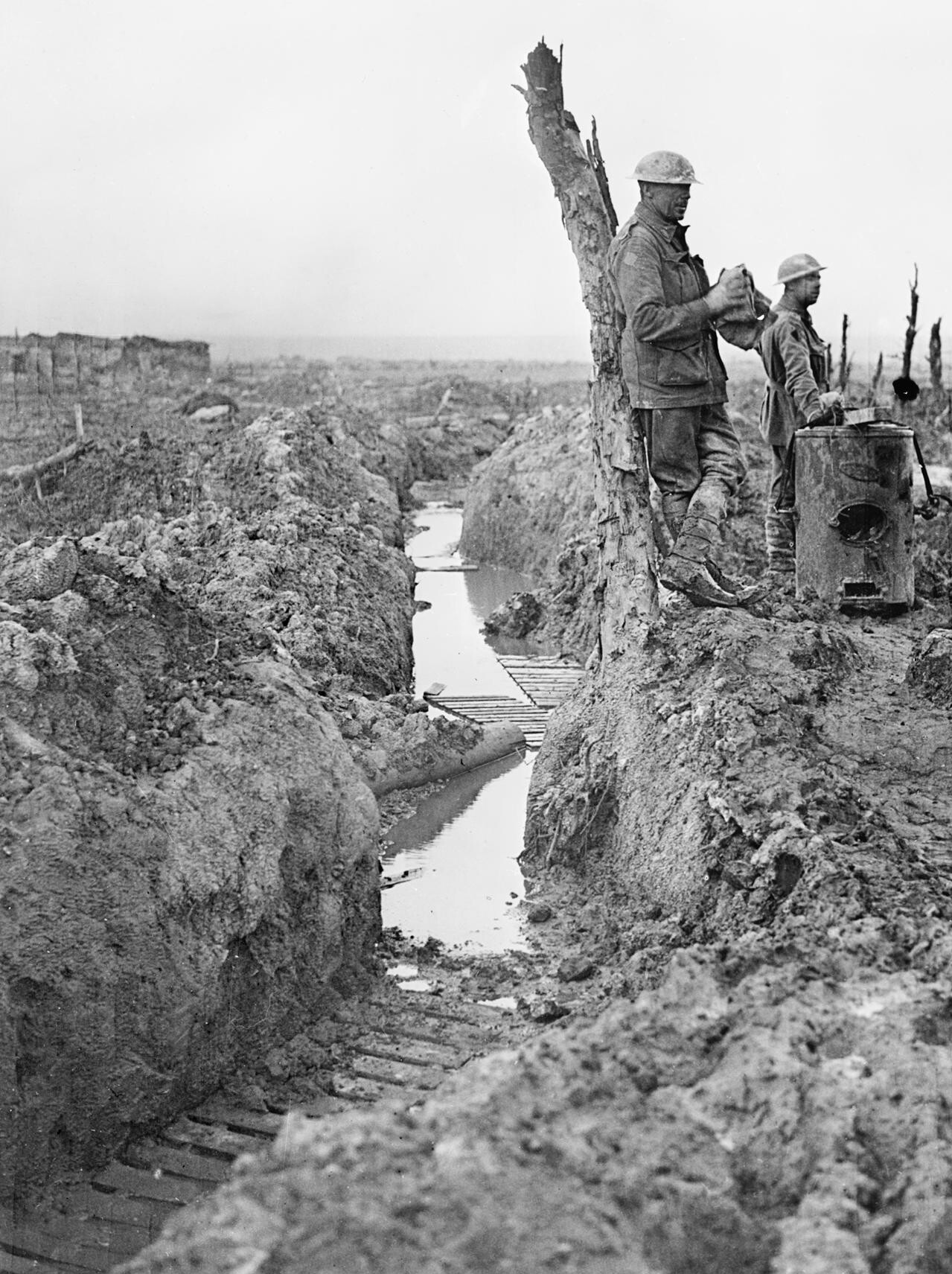
A typical waterlogged trench in the 1917 Ypres offensive.

=== Ypres ===
On 13 October 104th Bde entrained for the Salient and three days later it took over line east of Langemarck. The ground was covered with water-filled shellholes, movement was by duckboard tracks across the mud, and positions were frequently shelled with Mustard gas, bombed at night, or strafed by aircraft in daylight. The brigade was relieved after only two days, and went back to rest billets to be briefed on the coming operation. Fifth Army was preparing for a final attempt to gain the high ground (the Second Battle of Passchendaele), and 35th Division was tasked with a preliminary advance into the wreckage of Houthulst Forest to protect the left flank of the projected attack. 104th Brigade took up positions at 'Aden House' on 20 October and lay out among shellholes next day, before forming up on tapes at 02.00. In the 'Action of 22 October 1917', 23rd Manchesters attacked towards 'Angle Point' at 05.30. The battalion was on the right of the brigade's line, but could not gain touch with the neighbouring 34th Division. However, following a slow creeping barrage (100 yards (91 m) every 8 minutes), the battalion advanced about 400 yards (370 m) and reached the first objective with few casualties. From then on they met stubborn resistance with rifle and machine gun fire from both flanks, including from some huts on their left that had been missed by 18th LF. The fire was so intense that all the officers and many of the non-commissioned officers in the advance were killed or wounded. No further progress was possible, and a Company Sergeant Major brought the 50 survivors of the attacking companies out of the line. After being relieved they went back to 'Egypt House', a group of former German pillboxes intended for the battalion HQs but actually occupied by overflowing field dressing stations. After dark the battalion went back to 'Pascal Farm', and reported losses of 8 officers killed, 5 wounded and 1 missing, 20 ORs killed, 115 wounded and 55 missing. Some of the wounded later died, and many of the missing were dead: a total of 10 officers and 66 ORs died as a result of the attack.

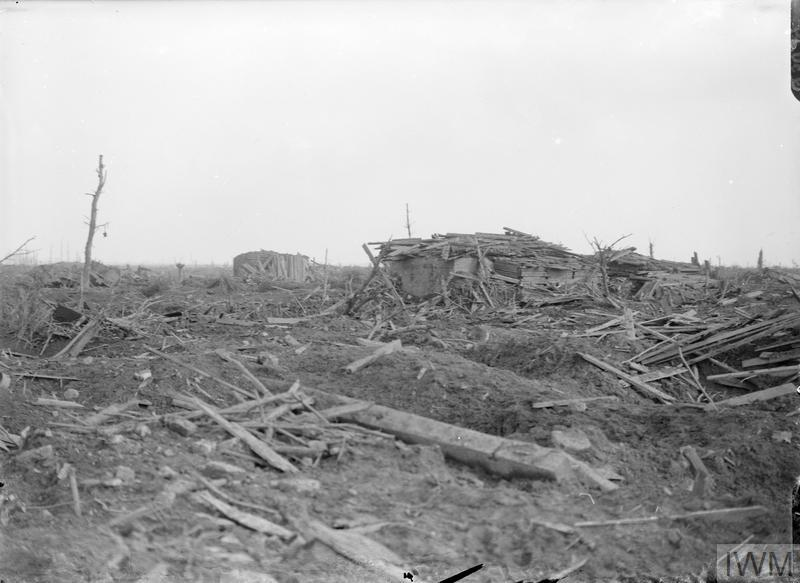
The ruins of Poelcapelle, 1917.

The survivors of 23rd Manchesters went back to De Wippe Cabaret on 23 October, and then to Elverdinge on 30 October, where their camp and working parties were shelled and they suffered further casualties. Meanwhile, other elements of 35th Division were still fighting in the last Passchendaele attack. The battalion entrained for Privett Camp at Proven on 3 November, where it was joined by the rest of the division as it was relieved. When 35th Division went back into the line in the Poelcappelle sector 104th Bde took its turn, with 23rd Manchesters in the front line trenches from 20/21 to 22/23 November. Then it went into divisional reserve at a collection of Nissen huts known as 'Kempton Park', which was still in range of German high-velocity guns. Here the battalion provided working parties for the Royal Engineers. By the time it went back to Polecapelle on 4 December, the trenches were dry and the line was quiet, but the cold weather meant that units had to be relieved after short spells. The battalion was rested from 11 December to 7 January 1918, then began rotating between Poelcapelle and Kempton Park. On 27 January a post held by 23rd Manchesters was raided by the enemy under cover of fog, and a sergeant and three men were captured, one of whom escaped when the raiders were fired on by the adjacent post.

== Disbandment ==
By early 1918 the BEF was suffering a manpower crisis. Brigades were reduced from four to three battalions, and surplus war-formed battalions were broken up to provide reinforcements for others. One of those selected for disbandment was the 23rd Manchesters, which ceased to exist on 16 February 1918. Most of the personnel were distributed as reinforcements to other battalions of the Manchesters: 2nd (Regular) Bn (7 officers and 150 ORs), 11th (Service) Bn (12 officers and 250 ORs) and 12th (Duke of Lancaster's Own Yeomanry) Bn (12 officers and 250 ORs).

=== 12th Entrenching Battalion ===
The remainder of the battalion, including the warrant officers, signallers and HQ under Lt-Col Stevens, were formed into No 12 Entrenching Battalion at II Corps Reinforcement Camp. No 12 Entrenching Bn also included the 'residues' of the 16th Cheshires, 14th Gloucesters and 20th LF, all former Bantam battalions of 35th Division that had been disbanded at the same time. The Entrenching battalions were to be used for constructing defences behind the front line, but were available to be drafted as reinforcements to frontline units where required. Lieutenant-Col Stevens did not stay in command of 12th Entrenching Bn for long: on 13 March he took over command of 18th LF and remained with 35th Division; later in the war he became a brigade commander.

When the German spring offensive was launched on 21 March 1918, 12th Entrenching Bn was ordered up from working on defences near Frières-Faillouël to occupy positions along the Crozat Canal behind the hard-pressed III Corps while the Royal Engineers prepared the bridges for demolition. By daylight on 22 March III Corps had fallen back over the canal and the bridges had been destroyed or damaged; 12th Entrenching Bn and the dismounted 4th Hussars were now in the front line, holding the canal bank from Quessy to Mennessis under the command of 18th (Eastern) Division. The following morning the Germans managed to force a crossing of the canal to the right of 12th Entrenching Bn, and began rolling up the line. Fighting went on until evening with mixed up units defending their positions: 12th Entrenching Bn was able to regain some of its lost ground, but the enemy now had a substantial bridgehead between Quessy and Tergnier. The 12th Entrenching Bn and 4th Hussars were relieved during the night, but owing to fog the process was not complete at daybreak on 23 March and they were still near the front line when the enemy attacked. The front line was overwhelmed and 12th Entrenching Bn was involved in heavy fighting. By the time it was extricated it had lost 10 officers and about 300 ORs. The battalion then spent the next few days retiring behind the French troops who had taken over the front line. It attached itself to 18th (E) Division's 54th Bde under Brig-Gen Lionel Sadleir-Jackson. When the retirement threatened the capture of some French artillery at Babœuf, two (Cheshire) companies of 12th Entrenching Bn took part in Sadleir-Jackson's effective counter-attack, which drove the enemy clean out of the village and some way back. 18th (E) Division was then relieved and sent to the Amiens sector, where at Gentelles on 1 April the survivors of 12th Entrenching Bn were absorbed into the 7th Royal West Kents.

=== Casualties ===
During its service, the 23rd Manchesters had lost 18 officers and 122 ORs killed, 33 officers and 680 ORs wounded, and 1 officer and 90 ORs missing. Among the survivors many became casualties later in 1918 while serving with other units, a number of whom are nevertheless identified on their gravestones and memorials as belonging to 23rd Manchesters.

== Insignia ==
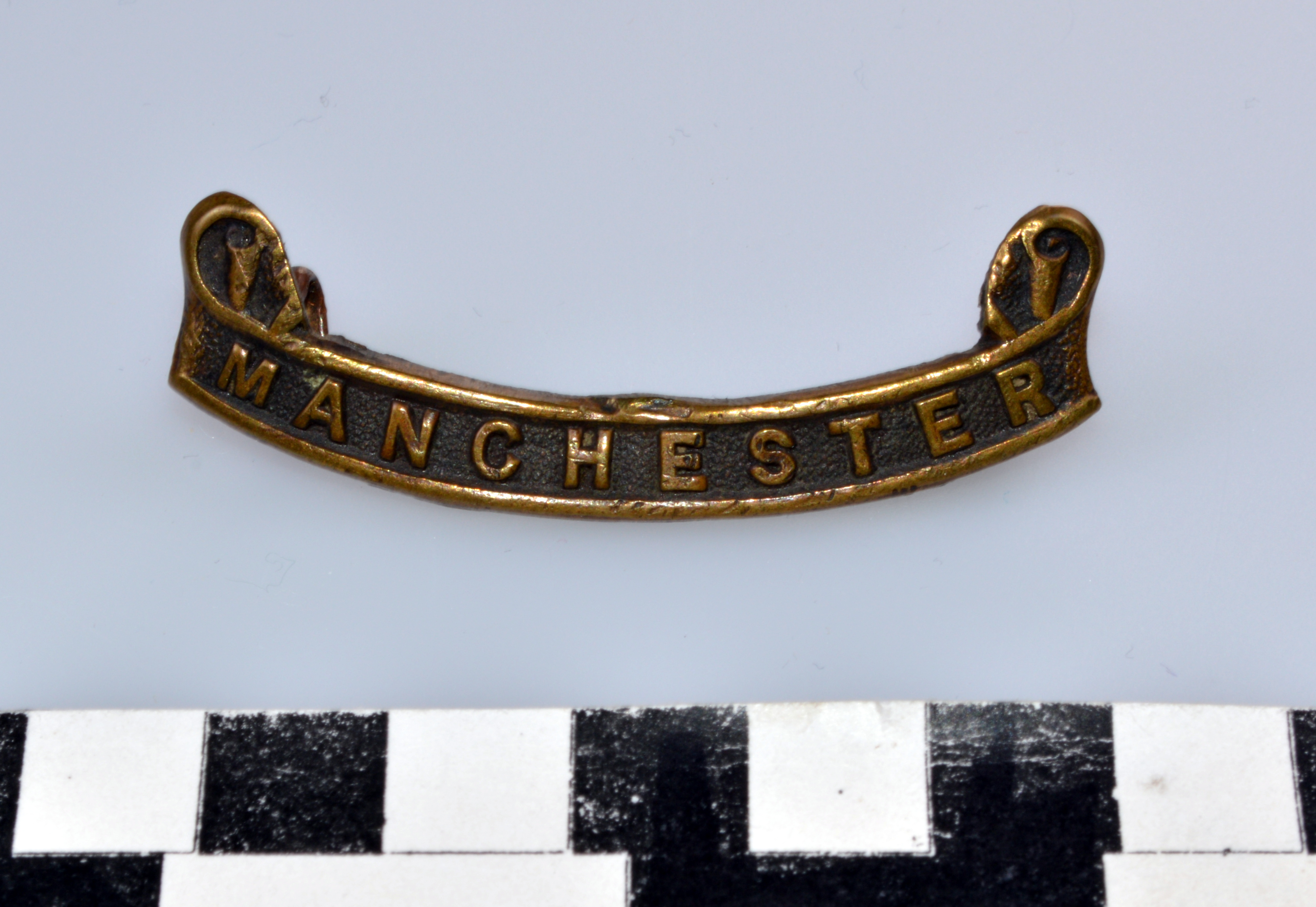
The lower scroll of the Manchester City battalions' unique shoulder title.

Although the Manchester City battalions wore the standard Manchester Regiment cap badge, they had a unique design of brass title worn on the shoulder straps. Above a scroll curving upwards at the end and inscribed 'MANCHESTER' was the battalion numeral ('8' for the 8th City Battalion), overall another scroll inscribed 'CITY' curving down at the ends behind the lower scroll. The brass had a bronze finish. As soon as the battalion landed in France it adopted a horizontal bar of regimental ribbon (green, with a central vertical yellow stripe) worn on both upper sleeves (the other battalions of 104th Bde wore plain coloured bars). The original divisional sign for 35th Division was a bantam cock; later this was replaced by a circle of seven conjoined '5's.

== Memorials ==
Lieutenant-Col Eustace Maxwell's body was never found. As an Indian Army officer with no known grave he is commemorated on the Neuve-Chapelle Indian Memorial. Thirty-seven of his men who died on 20 July 1916 and have no known grave are commemorated on the Thiepval Memorial to the Missing of the Somme. A few others from that day have marked graves in Flatiron Copse Cemetery at Mametz. Of those killed in the action of 22 October 1917, 74 have no known grave and are listed on the Tyne Cot Memorial to the missing of the Ypres Salient.

After the war the Kitchener battalions were granted a King's Colour. Those of the eight City battalions were laid up in the Manchester Regiment Chapel in Manchester Cathedral with an explanatory bronze plaque.
