= 15th (Service) Battalion, Sherwood Foresters (Nottingham) =

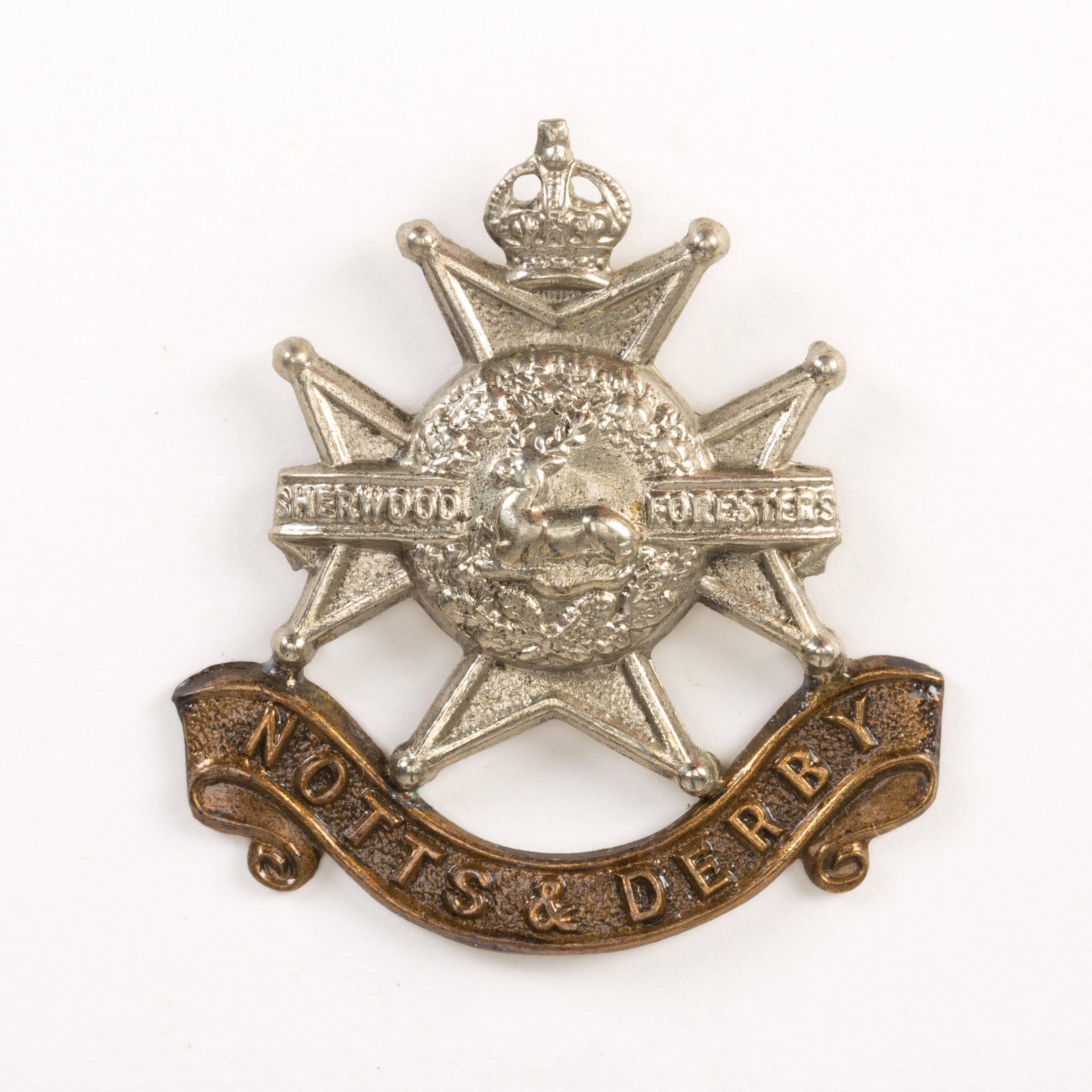
- Cap badge of the Sherwood Foresters
- Active: 12 February 1915–24 April 1919
- Allegiance: United Kingdom
- Branch: New Army
- Type: Bantam battalion
- Role: Infantry
- Size: One Battalion
- Part of: 35th Division
- Garrison/HQ: Nottingham
- Nickname: Nottingham's Bantams
- Patron: Mayor of Nottingham
- Engagements: Battle of the Somme; German retreat to the Hindenburg Line; Battle of Passchendaele; German spring offensive Aveluy Wood; Hundred Days Offensive

The 15th (Service) Battalion, Sherwood Foresters (Nottingham) ('15th Sherwoods') was a 'Bantam' infantry unit recruited as part of 'Kitchener's Army' in World War I. It was raised early in 1915 and served on the Western Front from early 1916, first seeing action at the Battle of the Somme. The Bantam concept did not survive the losses of the Somme, and had to be abandoned when the battalions became filled with reinforcements who were not simply undersized but actually unfit for service. In 1917 the 15th Sherwoods became a conventional infantry battalion and saw further action during the German retreat to the Hindenburg Line and subsequent actions. It suffered severe casualties at the Battle of Passchendaele and during the German spring offensive of 1918. It then took part in the final advance to victory in Flanders. The battalion was disbanded in 1919.

== Background ==
Alfred Leete's recruitment poster for Kitchener's Army.

On 6 August 1914, less than 48 hours after Britain's declaration of war, Parliament sanctioned an increase of 500,000 men for the Regular British Army, and the newly-appointed Secretary of State for War, Earl Kitchener of Khartoum issued his famous call to arms: 'Your King and Country Need You', urging the first 100,000 volunteers to come forward. This group of six divisions with supporting arms became known as Kitchener's First New Army, or 'K1'. The flood of volunteers overwhelmed the ability of the army to absorb and organise them, and by the time the Fifth New Army (K5) was authorised on 10 December 1914, many of the units were being organised as 'Pals battalions' under the auspices of mayors and corporations of towns up and down the country.

However, a large number of otherwise medically fit volunteers were turned away because they did not meet the minimum height requirement of the prewar Regular Army, of 5 feet 3 inches (160 cm). Alfred Bigland, the Member of Parliament for Birkenhead, persuaded Kitchener that this pool of potential manpower should be tapped, and he was given authority to raise a battalion of 'Bantams' (named after the small but pugnacious fighting cock). Three Bantam battalions were quickly raised at Birkenhead for the Cheshire Regiment, many of them coal miners who had travelled long distances to enlist, and the scheme spread to other areas. The War Office (WO) authorised each military district to recruit a battalion, attached to whichever regimental depot had sufficient capacity. By the end of the year an entire division (later numbered 35th Division) composed of Bantam battalions was being formed.

== Recruitment and training ==
The Bantam battalion for No 6 Recruiting District of Northern Command, (covering Lincolnshire, Leicestershire, Rutland, Staffordshire, Nottinghamshire and Derbyshire) was assigned to the Sherwood Foresters (Nottinghamshire and Derbyshire Regiment). The 15th (Service) Battalion, Sherwood Foresters (Nottingham) was raised by the Mayor of Nottingham and a recruitment committee on 12 February 1915, the first 18 men enlisting at the Mechanics' Institute in Nottingham four days later. The recruitment target set by the WO was 1350 to form four service companies and two depot companies to supply reinforcements. The men were billeted on local civilians, and the Mayor launched an appeal to supply the uniforms. Lieutenant-Colonel Hepworth Hill, commanding officer (CO) of the 1st Battalion, West India Regiment, when the war broke out, was appointed CO of the new battalion on 1 March.

On 21 June the service companies left for a tented camp at Masham in North Yorkshire where the 15th Foresters joined other Bantam battalions in 105th Brigade of 35th Division. Here it found that many of the recruits were not mature men of stocky build but under-age boys, and others were physically unfit for service, a problem faced by all the later Bantam battalions. However, when these were discharged, the depot companies at Nottingham still had 500 recruits to fill the ranks.

In August 35th Division moved by rail to Salisbury Plain for final intensive training, with the infantry at Tidworth Camp. 15th Sherwood Foresters was officially taken over by the military authorities on 27 August. Lieutenant-Col Hill was replaced as CO by Lt-Col Robert Gordon on 11 November. In December the division received orders to prepare for service in Egypt, and all ranks were issued with tropical uniforms. It was unkindly said that the bantams on Salisbury Plain in their oversized pith helmets resembled overgrown mushrooms. However, the division's destination was shortly afterwards changed to the Western Front and the pith helmets were exchanged for caps and gas masks. Embarkation for France began at the end of January 1916 and on 1 February 15th Sherwood Foresters boarded two trains at Tidworth for Folkestone, and landed at Boulogne the same day, with a strength of 29 officers and 892 other ranks (ORs) under the command of Lt-Col Gordon, with Lieutenant William Crellin (a 23-year-old Regular officer commissioned into the Sherwood Foresters on 14 February 1912) as adjutant. By 6 February the division had completed its concentration east of Saint-Omer.

=== 19th (Reserve) Battalion ===
The battalion's depot companies were amalgamated with those of the 16th (Chatsworth Rifles) and 17th (Welbeck Rangers) battalions of the Sherwood Foresters on 18 August 1915 at Brocklesby in Lincolnshire to form the 19th (Reserve) Battalion as a Local Reserve to provide reinforcements for the three pals battalions. The 19th Battalion moved to Ripon in North Yorkshire and joined 19th Reserve Brigade. In January 1916 it was at Harrogate and in July at Durham. On 1 September 1916 the Local Reserve battalions were transferred to the Training Reserve (TR) and the battalion was absorbed into other battalions of 19th (Reserve) Bde.

== Service ==
Over the next month 15th Sherwoods was billeted in various towns in the St Omer area, where the division continued training, with particular emphasis on 'bombing' and machine guns. From late February 105th Bde was attached to the more experienced 38th (Welsh) Division and its units went into the line in the Neuve-Chapelle sector alongside Welsh units for instruction in Trench warfare. On 7 March 15th Sherwoods were attached to 10th (Service) Battalion, South Wales Borderers (1st Gwent), at Le Touret. The Right Half battalion went into the trenches with them 7–10 March, followed by Left Half 10–14 March. The Bantams were each provided with two sandbags to place on the firestep so that they could stand on them to see over the parapet of the trench. The unit suffered its first casualties: three ORs wounded. On 14 March the battalion returned to billets behind the line at Merville, where it provided working parties and continued musketry training. 35th Division now took responsibility for its own section of the line, with 105th Bde taking over the trenches in the Laventie sector on 26 March. 15th Sherwoods and 15th Cheshires were the right and left battalions in the front line and appear to have been issued with steel helmets. The front line and communication trenches had been badly damaged by winter weather and in some places were flooded, and much work was required each night to repair them. All the front line companies sent patrols out into No man's land on the night of 27/28 March to examine the German barbed wire. Apart from some shelling and sniping the sector was quiet. 15th Sherwoods and 15th Cheshires were relieved on 30 March (handing over the steel helmets to the incoming battalions) and over the following weeks the Sherwoods alternated between the front and support lines and reserve billets. While in the line the battalions carried out continual repairs to shell-damaged trenches; while in billets they supplied working parties for the Royal Engineers (REs). On 12 April 105th Bde was relieved and went into divisional reserve, with 15th Sherwoods billeted at 'Cul de Sac', 2 miles (3.2 km) north of Sailly. On 19 April the brigade took over the Ferme du Bois trenches near Vieille-Chapelle with 15th Sherwoods in the right front sector. Heavy rain meant considerable labour to repair the trenches. The battalion alternated with 14th Glosters and when not in the line was billeted at Laventie or Paradis.

Both sides carried out trench raids. At 19.20 on the evening of 30 May the Germans laid down a heavy bombardment on the fire and support trenches held by 15th Sherwoods, who were due to be relieved by 14th Glosters that night. The British artillery promptly opened up in reply but the Sherwoods' trenches were almost obliterated. Captain R.W. Ainsworth, commanding the Sherwoods' right company, ordered his men to clear to the flanks to minimise casualties. At 20.15 the bombardment briefly ceased, then intensified to the flanks. At 20.30 a breathless runner arrived at 14th Glosters' Battalion HQ with the message 'Send reinforcements, the Germans have broken through'. 105th Brigade HQ ordered the Glosters to send a company up to 'Lansdown Post' and to occupy the reserve line with the rest of the battalion; they also had the Lewis gunners and the HQ details of 15th Sherwood Foresters who had already left the line for the relief. The left company of the Sherwoods attempted to reoccupy the line at 20.45, but were prevented by the bombardment. At 23.15 two platoons of the Glosters went forward to reoccupy the front line, and 18th Lancashire Fusiliers began to work along the line from the right, while the left company also made progress. By 23.30 the breach was closed; large sections of the line had been demolished and the Germans had entered it (they left behind a store of bombs when they retired back to their own line) and casualties had been heavy. W Company, which had lost all its officers, was relieved, but the rest of the battalion and two companies of 14th Glosters spent the rest of the night repairing trenches. The planned relief was successfully carried out the following night. During May 15th Sherwood Foresters had lost 12 ORs killed, 3 officers and 29 ORs wounded, and 2 officers and 236 ORs missing. Raiding by both sides continued during June.

=== Somme ===
The BEF had been preparing for that summer's 'Big Push' (the Battle of the Somme), which was launched on 1 July. 35th Division entrained on the night of 2/3 July to join Fourth Army in the Somme sector, with 15th Sherwoods billeted at Sus-Saint-Léger, then at Beauval. From 10 July it began a series of marches up to the front. 35th Division was in reserve for the Battle of Bazentin Ridge on 15 July, but 15th Sherwoods was not called upon. Next day the battalion took over the trenches on the eastern side of Trônes Wood, facing Maltz Horn Farm, with French troops to the right. The battalion was heavily bombarded on 18 and 19 July, including tear gas and other gas shells. On 20 July W and X Companies of 15th Sherwoods attempted to capture Maltz Horn Farm and Arrow Head Copse in conjunction. with a French attack. A preliminary bombardment was carried out for 30 minutes, but the artillery observers were unable to see its effect (The French cancelled their attack because of the difficulty of providing artillery support). The two Sherwood companies advanced in four waves at Zero (05.00) having already lost considerable casualties from enemy shellfire. On the right the first two waves of Z Company crossed the empty British front line trench (evacuated during the German counter-bombardment) and managed to reach the enemy front trench at Maltz Horn Farm. Here they were met by intense rifle and machine gun fire from a concealed second trench, which also swept No man's land and prevented the following waves from crossing. These two waves joined the two companies of 23rd Manchester Regiment (104th Bde) who were re-occupying the British front line. The remnant of Z Company was soon forced out of its small gains. W Company's left attack on Arrow Head Copse fared even worse: illuminated by the rising sun the attackers were an easy mark and were shot down from the concealed positions at Maltz Horn Farm. The survivors took cover in shellholes; a number of men initially reported as 'missing' were able to get back after dark. Following the failure of the first attack, 105th Bde ordered a second attack at 11.35 by 23rd Manchesters. This also failed. The French then warned of signs of a German counter-attack, and the survivors of the two battalions prepared to defend their positions, together with the other two weak companies of Sherwoods holding the left of the line with a company of the divisional pioneer battalion, 19th Northumberland Fusiliers. Lieutenant-Col Gordon advised 105th Bde that both the attacking battalions should be relieved, pointing out that the Sherwoods had already endured four days in the line under gas shelling before making that attack, and the Manchesters had come up through the bombardment and been thrown into an attack without any reconnaissance. The Manchesters had no senior officers left, and his own Sherwoods only had one effective officer per company. His recommendation was followed, 15th Sherwoods going back to bivouacs in Talus Boise that night; the whole of 105th Bde was relieved next day. 15th Sherwoods had lost 10 officers and 39 ORs killed, 9 officers and 146 ORs wounded, and 36 ORs missing.

On 24 July the battalion was back in the reserve trenches at 'Silesia Trench', which it consolidated and deepened, while Z Company formed the garrison of the Bricqueterie and turned it into a strongpoint. After short spells in the line, the brigade went back to bivouacs in Sand Pit Valley at the end of the month. On 10 August it went by train to Méricourt and marched to 'Citadel Camp'. Here it continued training (particularly for the reinforcements received) but also provided large working parties for the REs. On 20 August the battalion marched back to the Old British Line, and three days later took over the Maltz Horn Farm trenches. 35th Division had taken over the attacks towards Guillemont. A planned attack on a strongpoint opposite 'Arrow Head Copse' by 15th Sherwoods and 14th Glosters on 23 August was called off when the British heavy artillery failed to damage it. The assaulting party of 15th Sherwoods was already moving into position to begin the attack when it was postponed at 17.27, three minutes before Zero; the men were caught by rifle fire and bombs at their jumping-off line, and suffered several casualties. The raid was completely cancelled at 18.00. 35th Division discharged smoke to assist the neighbouring attacks but took no further part, although its units were under constant shellfire, and casualties mounted. 15th Sherwoods were relieved that evening, the relief taking place under heavy shellfire. The whole of 35th Division was then relieved on 26 August, 15th Sherwoods going back to Sand Pit Valley, before entraining on 30 August to join Third Army in the Arras area to the north.

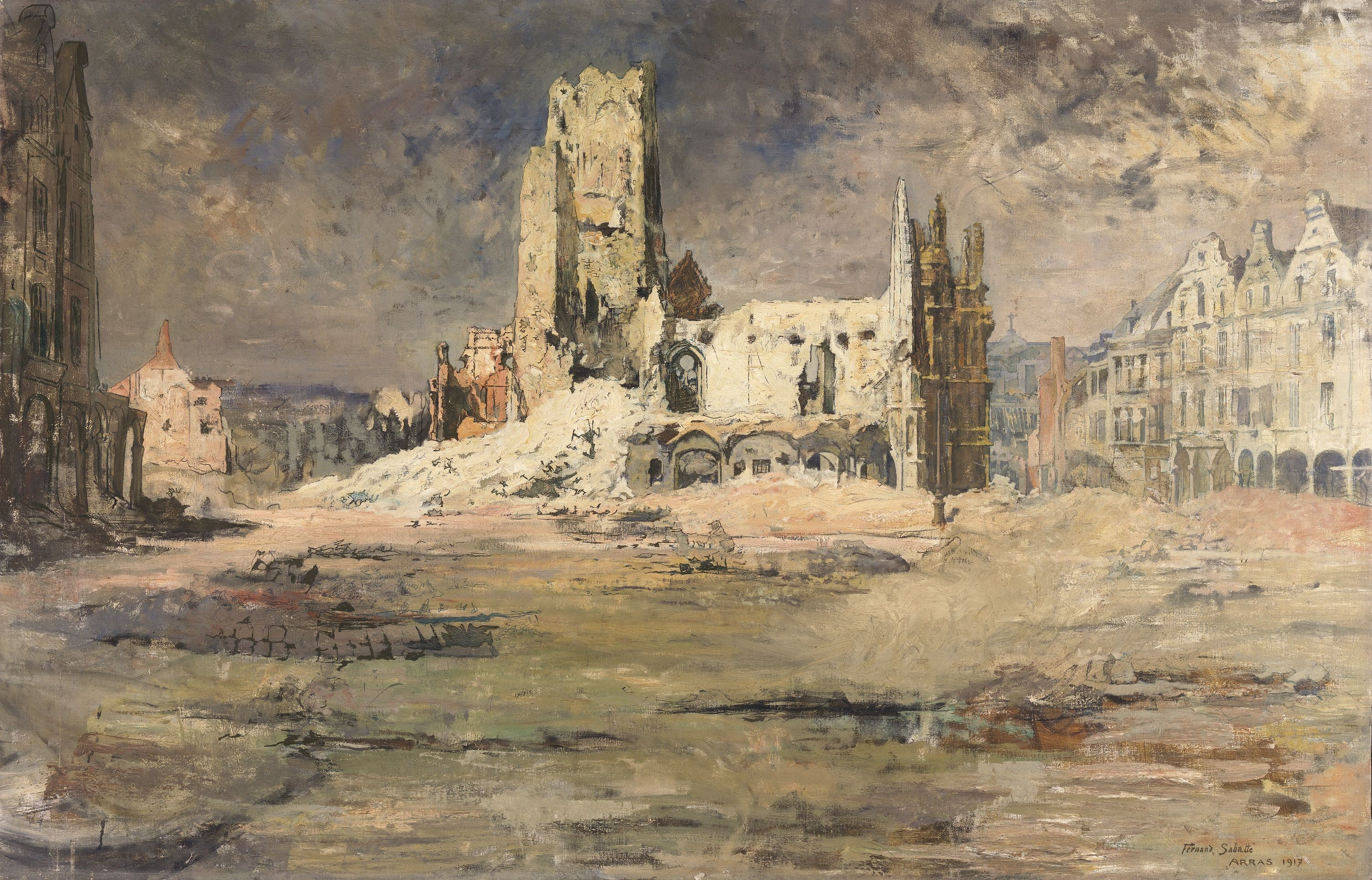
The ruined belfry in Arras 1916, by Fernand Sabatté.

On arrival at Arras on 3 September 15th Sherwoods went into the line outside the town, and were not relieved until 28 September when the battalion went into reserve billets in the town. The sector was quiet, but on 16 September the battalion swept the enemy trenches with rifle and Lewis gun fire in support of a raid by 104th Bde. The town itself was under intermittent shellfire and the battalions had to supply large working parties to clean and strengthen the ramshackle trenches the division had taken over from French troops (including raising the firesteps so the bantams could fire over the parapet). The trenches then had to be constantly repaired as they collapsed under winter rain. Shelling, mortaring, mining and gas cloud releases were common on this front. Parties from X and Y Companies 15th Sherwoods carried out a raid on the evening of 28 October opposite 'Clarennce' and 'Cuthbert' craters. The raiding part consisted of three bombing squads, each with a clearing squad, followed by a demolition party from 204th (Empire) Field Company, RE, and an intelligence-gathering party, all protected by a covering party while the rest of the battalion carried out a demonstration. The raiders had undergone special training from a sergeant-major of the Army Gymnastics School. The raid brought back a prisoner having done considerable damage to the enemy positions. On 28 November the battalion's positions were raided after two days of heavy bombardment: the sentry party was outnumbered and outranged by German grenades, so they gave ground slowly and fell back to the next sentry group. The support company was rushed up and the raiders were held up at a bombing block in the trench. A raid had been anticipated, and all the spare men at battalion HQ (cooks, signallers, storemen etc) quickly manned the communication trenches until the reserve company came up to man the reinforce the front parties, which had already thrown out the raiders. For part of September the second-in-command, Major Crellin (the former adjutant), was in temporary command; during part of November Lt-Col J.F. Clyme was in command. After a long spell at the front, 35th Division was relieved at the beginning of December and went to rest billets until the end of the year, with 15th Sherwoods at Dainville and Beaufort.

=== End of the Bantams ===
35th Division's formation sign after 'de-Bantamisation'.

By the end of 1916 15th Sherwoods had suffered total casualties of 13 officers killed, 15 wounded and 3 missing, 100 ORs killed, 492 wounded, and 78 missing. After the Maltz Horn Farm attacks the commander of 35th Division, Major-General Reginald Pinney had written 'The best type of Bantams done in'. and in August he was complaining of the poor physique of the reinforcements he was being sent. Pinney wanted a meeting with GHQ to discuss the future of the bantams. On 8 December his successor (Maj-Gen Herman Landon) complained that the replacement drafts he had received were not of the same tough physical standard as the original bantams but were undeveloped, unfit men from the towns. A subsequent medical inspection rejected 1439 men of the division and a second inspection removed another batch, bringing the total to 2784. These men were mainly sent to the Labour Corps. Their places were filled with men transferred from disbanded Yeomanry Cavalry regiments; these had to be quickly retrained as infantry and a divisional depot was formed for the purpose (it is not clear how many of these 15th Sherwoods received). Original bantams who passed the medical inspection remained in place. The 35th Division was officially 'de-Bantamised' on 22 January 1917 and replaced its 'Bantam Cock' divisional sign with a circle of seven 5s.

=== Hindenburg Line ===
15th Sherwoods spent January 1917 at Dainville training the reinforcement drafts and providing working parties. 35th Division moved to the training area around Flesselles at the beginning of February, with 15th Sherwoods going to Saint-Vaast-en-Chaussée. Here training in new infantry tactics was carried out. (Note: Following the General Staff training manual SS 143, Instructions for the Training of Platoons for Offensive Action, issued 14 February 1917.) Lieutenant-Col Gordon was invalided on 19 February and Maj Crellin became acting Lt-Col. On 21 February the battalion took over trenches from the French at Chilly at the southern end of the old Somme battlefield, finding the trenches flooded. Cases of frostbite and Trench foot were common in the division, and the British front and support lines were heavily bombarded on 23 February. From 6 to 12 March the battalion was training and refitting in divisional reserve, then provided working parties and cleared the mud-filled communication trenches. The German retreat to the Hindenburg Line (Operation Alberich) began in this sector on 16 March. On the evening of 17 March 15th Sherwoods took over the support line and battalion HQ of 14th Glosters, who had occupied the German front line. Next day the battalion took over the cautious pursuit, moving up to the old German support line, but 35th Division was then withdrawn and 15th Sherwoods was put to work to repair the Chaulnes–Nesle railway across the area devastated by the Germans. Lieutenant-Col R.N.S. Gordon resumed command on 23 March

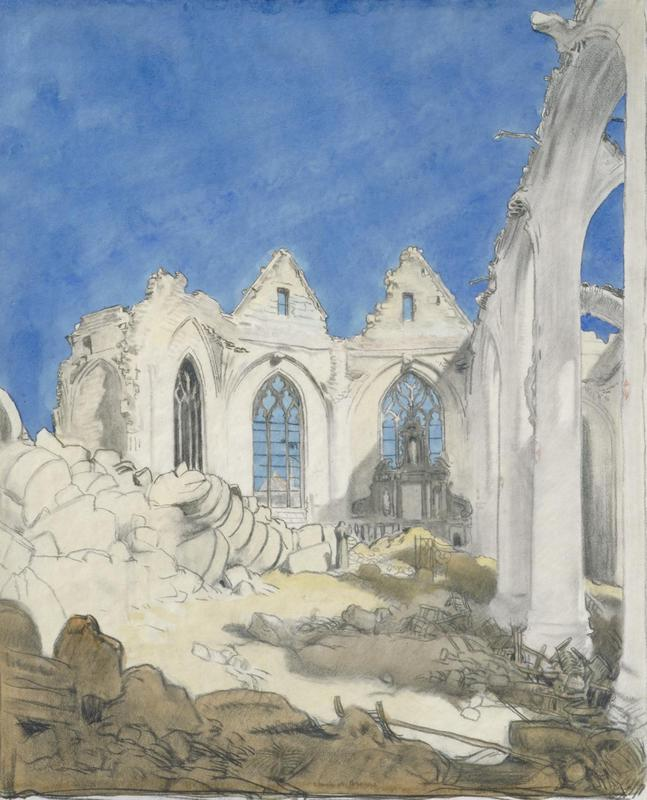
The ruins of Péronne, by Sir William Orpen.

After three weeks of rail and road repairs, 35th Division was shifted towards St Quentin, where the Hindenburg Line ran in front of the town. 15th Sherwoods dug at new defensive line south of Fresnoy-le-Petit, and then took over the outpost line from 21 April. The positions were not completely settled, and there was considerable patrolling and raiding while new outposts were established. When not in the line the battalion was in divisional reserve at Tertry, working on road repair. In May 15th Sherwoods began alternating with 14th Glosters at Tertry or in the line at Gricourt. On the night of 9/10 May 15th Sherwoods (operating under the codename 'Purity') carried out an operation against a German outpost at Les Trois Sauvage Farm, which 35th Division had already attacked twice. Two platoons each from W and X Companies went out, X Company providing the assaulting and covering parties to attack the ruined farmhouse from the north west (left), W Company to establish new outposts to the south west (right). The rest of W and X Companies would be in support, while Z Company would supply working parties to consolidate each outpost. The assaulting and covering parties on the left established themselves round a crossroads in No man's land and then the assaulting party closed up to the farm using the new tactics, with bombers to the right and Lewis guns to the left. They got within 40 yards (37 m) of the farm before they were challenged, and were then held up by a thick belt of wire. Fighting broke out, with rifles, Lewis guns and rifle grenades being used in the bright moonlight. As casualties rose and ammunition ran short, it was obvious that the farmhouse could not be assaulted, and the parties withdrew. Some new outposts were, however, established, and the battalion began consolidating the new line. The operation had cost 4 ORs killed, 13 wounded and 2 missing. Lieutenant-Col Gordon was finally invalided to England on 12 May 1917 and Maj Crellin was promoted to Lt-Col to take over permanent command of the battalion. 15th Sherwoods carried out another raid on Le Trois Sauvage on 15/16 May, with the object of destroying enemy outposts, but again found the wire round the farm impassable. The battalion left for rest in the ruins of Péronne on 23 May.

=== The Bird Cage and The Knoll ===
On 2 June 35th Division shifted a few miles north to the Gauche Wood sector, where again the defences were not continuous trenches but a line of detached posts facing the Hindenburg Line. 15th Sherwoods alternated with 14th Glosters at Villers-Guislain. While out of the front line battalions worked on wiring and improving the chain of outposts and in digging a 'Brown Line' and a 'Green Line' behind. It was a quiet sector, but raiding was common. On 4 June Lt-Col Crellin was awarded a Distinguished Service Order (DSO) in the 1917 Birthday Honours. On the night of 1/2 July the division went into reserve, with 15th Sherwoods at Villers-Faucon. When it returned to the front a week later 35th Division had moved to Épehy, where the front line positions sloping down towards the Hindenburg Line along the St Quentin Canal had to be strengthened and the outposts linked up. Among 15th Sherwoods' responsibilities was 'the Bird Cage' at the head of a deep salient into No man's land, connected back to three quarries and a sunken road in the main line. On the night of 12/13 July the Germans raided the Bird Cage, first putting down a heavy barrage on the sunken road and all approaches at midnight. When this lifted at 01.15 enemy troops could be seen in front of the wire to the right of the Bird Cage, and rifle and machine gun fire was opened on them. The German seem to have been caught by the British counter-barrage and sent up flares, calling down their own barrage once more. This ended at 02.30. The battalion's casualties amounted to 23 ORs. After repairing their trenches with the aid of 19th Northumberland Fusiliers, the battalion was relieved on 15/16 July and went back to camp at Aizecourt-le-Bas for a week's rest. It then went into support in the Lempire sector with Y Company working for 180th Tunnelling Company, RE.

Although the British line was on the higher ground, it was overtopped by a feature known as 'The Knoll' that the Germans retained. On 1/2 August 105th Brigade was taken out of the line to prepare for an attack on this disputed position, practising over a full-scale replica of the Knoll trenches laid out at Aizecourt. The date was set for 15 August, but was delayed until 19 August to allow three Heavy Artillery Groups to be brought up to support the operation. While the artillery stockpiled ammunition and registered their guns, other preparations for the operation included the provision of battle HQs for the brigade and battalions, with buried communication cables, dugouts for the additional troops and the trench mortars, and new forming-up trenches for the assaulting troops. The battalions moved up to Lempire on 17–18 August. 105th Brigade held the line with 16th Cheshires and attacked at Zero (04.00 on 19 August) with 15th Sherwoods (left) and 15th Cheshires (right). The Sherwoods went over in three waves: Y and Z Companies formed the first two (assaulting) waves, three platoons of W Company formed the third wave tasked with digging a new trench in front of the Old German Line, and X Company in reserve provided carrying parties. The German trench was virtually destroyed by the British artillery and the wire was completely cut: the assaulting wave met little or no opposition. The moppers-up from Y Company dealt with the Germans in the dugouts. The assaulting companies began returning to billets with their prisoners and wounded at 05.00 while W Company began the new trench and part of Z Company formed a bombing block at the end of the captured section of trench. Carrying parties of 16th Cheshire were taking forward the stores needed to consolidate and hold the captured ground. 15th Sherwoods' casualties were 27 killed, 51 wounded and 5 missing. That night 15th Foresters and 15th Cheshires were relieved by 14th Glosters who successfully defended the Knoll on 21 August. Unfortunately, the British heavy artillery left for other duties, and without its support 106th Bde were unable to hold the Knoll against a heavy German counter-attack on 30 August.

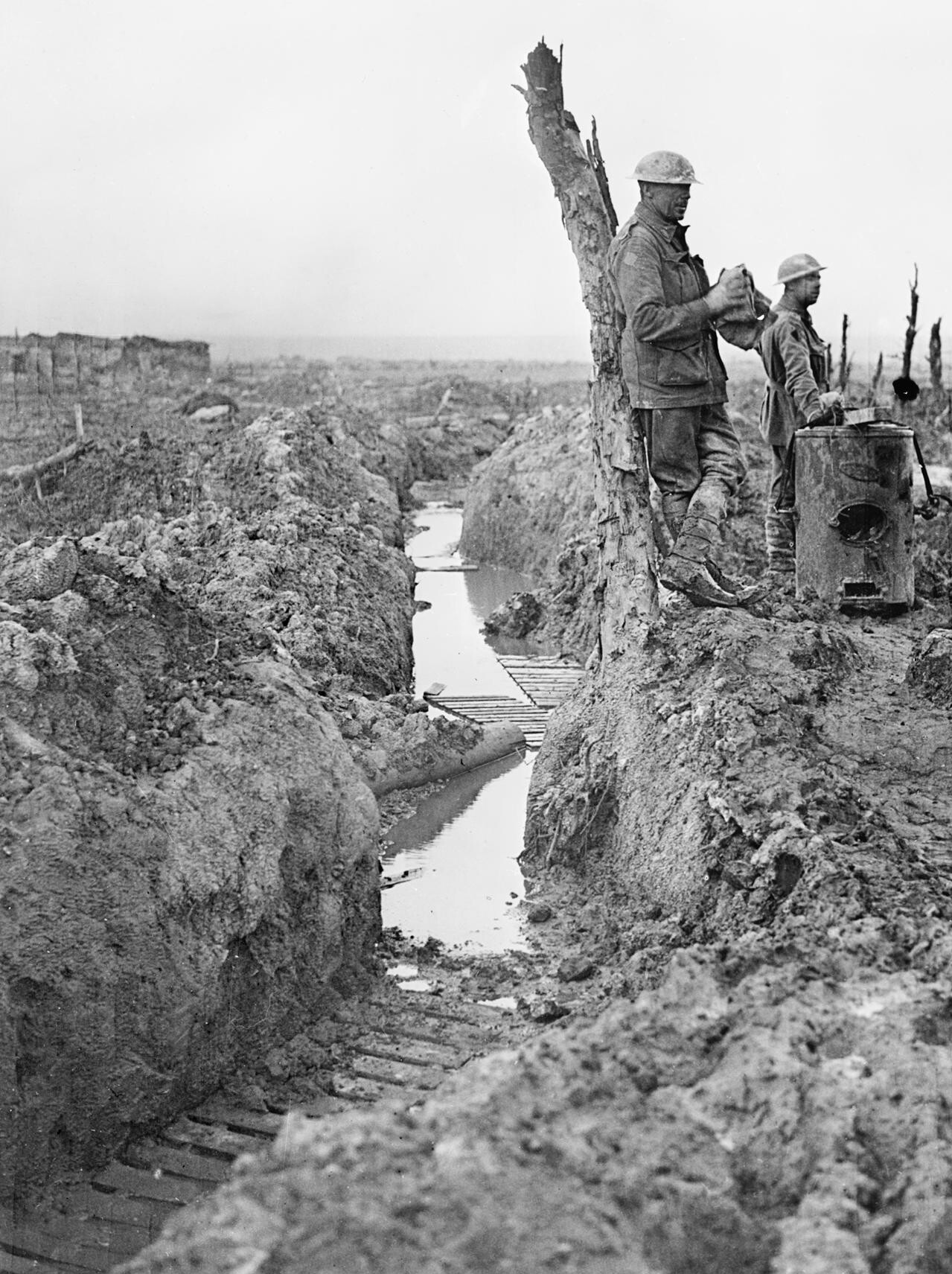
A typical waterlogged trench in the 1917 Ypres offensive.

=== Passchendaele ===
15th Sherwoods spent most of September providing working parties in and behind the lines. On 1 October the battalion went by lorry to Péronne and on 2/3 October entrained for Arras. Here the division began training at Warlus in preparation for a move to the Ypres Salient where the Third Ypres Offensive had been raging for two months. On 13 October 35th Division entrained for the Salient and three days later 105th Bde took over support line at Elverdinge. Fifth Army was preparing for a final attempt to gain the high ground (the Second Battle of Passchendaele), and 35th Division was tasked with a preliminary advance into the wreckage of Houthulst Forest to protect the left flank of the projected attack. The ground was covered with water-filled shellholes, movement was by duckboard tracks across the mud, and troops were frequently shelled with Mustard gas, bombed at night, or strafed by aircraft in daylight. 15th Sherwoods' officers reconnoitred the area they were to attack, and the battalion provided working parties to prepare forward gun positions, 105th Brigade took up positions on the Division's left on 20 October, with 15th Sherwoods in brigade support. At 02.00 on 22 October the leading infantry formed up on tapes in No man's land to avoid the inevitable enemy barrage on their trenches when the battle opened. The men lay out in rain, their rifles becoming clogged with mud. The 'Action of 22 October 1917' was launched at 05.35, with the infantry following a slow creeping barrage (100 yards (91 m) every 8 minutes). Keeping as close as possible to the barrage 14th Glosters on the left reached its first objective without much difficulty, but 16th Cheshires on the right were badly held up by fire from pillboxes in front. As 14th Glosters moved on towards their second objective the gap between the two battalions became worse. At 08.00 X Company of 15th Sherwoods under Capt Fleming struggled up through the woods to fill the gap and form a defensive flank for the Glosters' right company with two platoons. Another company supported the Cheshires. About 16.30 the enemy launched a determined counter-attack: the Glosters and Sherwoods held firm, supported by a defensive barrage, but the left of the Cheshires crumbled, and the supporting Y Company of the Sherwoods was partly surrounded, falling back about 100 yards (91 m) before halting to reply; they were eventually driven back to the original line. The CO of 14th Glosters gave permission for his right company and Capt Fleming's X Company to echelon back to reduce the dangerous angle, with another platoon of Foresters extending the line. By the end of the day 105th Bde had stabilised its front, but only 14th Glosters was on its objective. 15th Cheshires took over the line that night, though X Company of the Sherwoods remained in the line with the other three in support. These troops threw back another counter-attack at 05.30 next morning (23 October). 15th Sherwoods was relieved by 106th Bde on the night of 23/24 October, having suffered casualties of 1 officer and 15 ORs killed, 1 officer and 160 ORs wounded, 1 officer and 20 ORs missing.

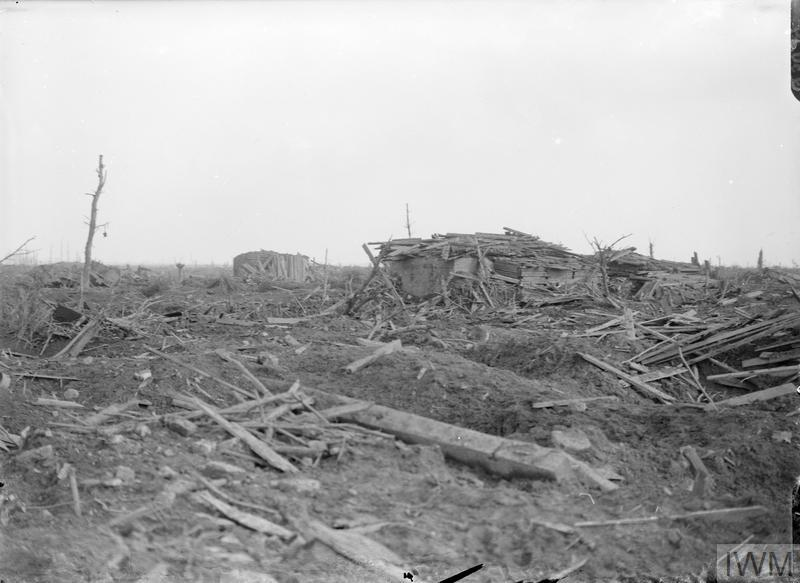
The ruins of Poelcapelle, 1917.

15th Sherwoods went back to Larry Camp at Elverdinge where it rested and refitted until 29 October when it returned to the division's front line. Early next day the Canadian Corps further down the line attacked Passchendaele, and the battalion was heavily bombarded and suffered a number of casualties. X Company's snipers, however, hit a number of Germans seen running about in the nearby woods. The battalion was relieved on 1 November and after its units had refitted 35th Division entrained for Proven. It went back into the line in the Poelcappelle sector on 23 November with 15th Sherwoods in reserve at a collection of Nissen huts known as 'Kempton Park'. Over the following days the battalions rotated between the front, support and reserve lines at Poelcappelle and Langemarck. Life in the Salient was tough, improving defences was hard work in frozen mud, and the troops had to be regularly rotated, each relief entailing a long march along duckboard tracks.

=== Winter 1917–18 ===
On 9–11 December 15th Sherwoods moved by rail and road to 'School Camp' at Poperinghe where it rested and trained until the new year. Some leave was given: in the absence of Lt-Col Crellin, Maj W.A. McClelland was in command, but he and another officer were killed on 18 January 1918 while the battalion was working on the support line, and the adjutant, Capt K.W. Morrell, had to take temporary command. The infantry and engineers had much work in repairing trenches after heavy snow and then a thaw. The battalion took over the left front trench from 21 January. During its relief by 17th Lancashire Fusiliers on 24 January a German incendiary shell entered a captured pillbox being used as a company HQ: 2 officer and 2 ORs of the Sherwoods were killed, 2 other officers and 2 ORs were wounded, and the company commander of the Lancashire Fusiliers was killed.

Because of the severe manpower shortage being suffered by the BEF, infantry brigades were reduced to three battalions and the surplus war-formed battalions disbanded to provide reinforcements to the others. In the resulting reorganisation 16th Cheshires and 14th Glosters were both disbanded, and 105th Bde was brought up to establishment by the addition of 4th (Extra Reserve) Bn, North Staffordshire Regiment. 15th Sherwoods received a draft of 4 officers and 100 ORs from the 17th Sherwoods (Welbeck Rangers) who had been disbanded from 39th Division.

=== Operation Michael ===
On 9 March 1918, 35th Division became part of GHQ Reserve, with 15th Sherwoods training at Chauny Farm Camp. When the German Spring Offensive (Operation Michael) opened on 21 March, the division was ordered to move south. 105th Brigade entrained at Roesbrugge on 23 March, beginning to arrive at Méricourt-l'Abbé, south west of Amiens, that evening. After they detrained, the battalions marched through the night to relieve the hard-pressed 21st Division. 15th Sherwoods reached Curlu Wood, and at 12.00 on 24 March were ordered to counter-attack. Y and Z Companies immediately went forward with 15th Cheshires on their right and checked the German advance. The enemy advanced in close formation, and it was reported that one of the Sherwoods' Lewis gun teams annihilated an entire wave of 60 men. However, the Sherwoods could not get in touch with any friendly troops to the left, and about 16.30 the enemy outflanked the two companies, very few of whom survived the attack. Luckily, the company that had been left to assist the detraining at Méricourt now arrived in time to shore up the left. At 17.00 the battalion was ordered to withdraw, which it did successfully, taking up a new position on the Curlu–Maurepas road with 15th Cheshire to the right and 104th Bde to the left. That evening two companies of 4th North Staffords arrived from Méricourt station in support. At 10.30 next morning (25 March) the enemy renewed their attack (the First Battle of Bapaume) with a heavy barrage all along the line, apparently from the rear, and managed to push into Maricourt Wood, threatening 105th Bde's left flank. Units began withdrawing, and finding both flanks 'in the air' and in danger of being isolated, 15th Sherwoods fell back to a defensive line in front of Maricourt village. Here it held the enemy off, despite them being round the left flank, until 20.30 when the battalion was relieved. The situation elsewhere was critical, and that night 35th Division was ordered to pull back to the Albert–Bray-sur-Somme road. The orders reached 105th Bde at 22.00 and despite the confusion of straggling units that formed part of its line, it completed the move by 01.00 on 26 March. 15th Sherwoods took up position on this line and placed outposts in front.

35th Division had been ordered to prepare for retirement across the River Ancre, but to delay as long as possible to allow the artillery and stores to cross first. 15th Sherwoods were warned at 10.00 that the enemy were approaching and they manned the outpost line alongside 15th Cheshires; once again the left flank was open. Fighting went on for hours, with no support on the left apart from a few tanks that arrived to help. The division began its retirement at 14.00; 15th Sherwoods received its orders at 15.30. 105th Bde passed through the rearguard at Morlancourt at 16.00 and were across the river by 18.00. But Third Army HQ tried to countermand the retirement, and soon after 19.00 the tired 105th Bde began recrossing the Ancre to regain the high ground beyond Morlancourt. 15th Sherwoods and 4th North Staffords were ordered to attack. Brigadier-General Arthur Marindin, commanding 105th Bde, complained that this attack with tired troops who were short of ammunition had little chance of success. VII Corps HQ concurred, and the attack was cancelled. 15th Sherwoods were stopped as they were recrossing the bridge at Ville-sur-Ancre; unfortunately the recall order did not reach the North Staffords, who crossed over and formed up for the attack. Finding themselves alone, the North Staffords prepared for defence before the order was finally received and they withdrew at 01.30 next morning. They rejoined 15th Sherwoods, who were disposed along the railway line from Buire Halt to Dernancourt, with outposts along the near river bank and posts on the far side hidden among the rushes and trees. On 27 March the Germans advanced against Dernancourt, but were broken up by fire from the artillery and the outposts along the river: 15th Sherwoods recorded 'the day passed without incident'. That afternoon 105th Bde was relieved and went into support, with 15th Sherwoods in the quarry behind Buire. After the confusion over the retirement orders the divisional commander had been removed on 27 March and Brig-Gen Marindin was temporarily commanding; Lt-Col Crellin of 15th Sherwoods briefly took over 105th Bde until a more senior battalion commander returned from hospital. The battalion had returned to the front line on 28/29 March, but reported 'no incident worthy of record'. It was relieved by Australian troops on the morning of 31 March and went to billets in Lahoussoye. The BEF's 'Great Retreat' was over and the first phase of the German offensive was definitively halted on 5 April. Since 24 March the 15th Sherwoods had lost 12 officers and 458 ORs and had been reduced to two composite companies: 'Captain Morrell's' and 'Lieutenant Morgan's'. Lieutenant-Col Crellin was awarded a Bar to his DSO and the adjutant, Capt Graham Callow, also received a DSO.

=== Aveluy Wood ===
15th Sherwoods received a draft of 350 reinforcements at the beginning of April and on the night of 6/7 April, 35th Division marched south through the rain to occupy the front line trenches in Aveluy Wood, which it held for the next two months. The men worked on improving the trenches and shelters, and active patrolling was conducted every night when the battalion was in the front line, which sometimes led to clashes with enemy patrols and casualties. The battalion was billeted in Hédauville when not in the front line, though it was temporarily shelled out of the village on 15–16 April. While the second phase of the German offensive (the Battle of the Lys) continued further north, Third Army contested possession of Aveluy Wood on a smaller scale. 35th Division put in a brigade-sized attack on the evening of 22 April 1918 with 15th Sherwoods (left) and 15th Cheshires (centre) attacked alongside 19th Durham Light Infantry (DLI) of 104th Bde and units of 38th (Welsh) Division further right. The intention was to capture the remaining high ground inside the wood not already held by the British. After 3 minutes' bombardment of the wood's edge from 19.20 the barrage began creeping forward and then the infantry attacked at Zero (19.30). At first 15th Sherwoods' advance went well, then the right of the battalion ran into a strongpoint near the edge of the wood that had not been suppressed by the artillery. Containing three machine guns this post also prevented the left of 15th Cheshires from advancing. 19th DLI had been caught by German artillery on the start line and were then silhouetted against the setting sun and suffered heavy casualties. After 3 hours' fighting 15th Sherwoods held a diagonal line with the right flank angled back to 15th Cheshires on the start line. The Sherwoods lost 5 officers and 112 ORs in this operation. It was relieved on 23/24 April and went back to Hédauville, where it resumed work on the support and reserve lines. From early May the battalion rotated between the forward area, training at Herrisart, and billets in Bouzincourt, where it worked to strengthen the 'Purple Line' defences and the 'Old French Line'. From 25 May the shelling on both sides became worse, and part of 35th Division made an attack on 1 June; a second attack, by 105th Bde on 5 June, was called off at the last minute. The division began to be relieved, 105th Bde marching on 16 June to Puchevillers to rest until the end of the month. On 30 June the division entrained for the north, joining Second Army and taking over the line around Mont Kemmel, which had recently been fought over and was still under shellfire. 15th Sherwoods relieved the 358th French Infantry Regiment in the reserve position and over following weeks rotated with the rest of 105th Bde in the reserve, support and front line positions before the division went into reserve on 9 August.

=== Hundred Days Offensive ===
Further south the Allied Hundred Days Offensive had been launched on 8 August, and by the end of the month there were signs that the Germans were pulling back. A proposed relief by 105th Bde on the night of 29/30 August was cancelled when the Germans were found to have abandoned Bailleul. Instead, on 4 September the brigade relieved 120th US Infantry Regiment, who had been holding the line in the Canal Bank sector. The German defence now relied upon artillery: by 15 September, patrols had found that the actual defence line was 1,000 yards (910 m) away, so the whole division advanced its outpost line, meeting virtually no opposition. Y Company of 15th Sherwoods raided the 'Spoil Bank' beside the Ypres–Comines Canal and the dugouts beyond, taking a few prisoners.

The Allies launched a coordinated series of offensives on 26–29 September. Second Army's attack (the Fifth Battle of Ypres) began on 28 September. After resting at School Camp 15th Sherwoods completed its assembly for the attack about midnight. Zero was at 05.30, and the battalion led by X (right) and W (left) Companies advanced behind a strong barrage with 4th North Staffords on the right and 104th Bde on the left. The plan allowed 50 minutes to cover 1,500 yards (1,400 m) to reach the first objective at the 'Caterpillar', where the barrage would pause for 50 minutes to allow consolidation. Y and Z Companies would then pass through to the second objective behind the creeping barrage. Although heavy rain began to fall shortly after Zero and te ground was badly putted from previous fighting, everything went according to plan, the Germans showing little inclination to fight and many surrendering. The battalion had reached and consolidated all its objectives by 08.30. In the afternoon 41st Division then passed through the battalion's position to continue the advance. At 04.30 next morning 105th Bde received orders to continue the attack, 15th Sherwoods assembling an hour later in 'Battle Wood' as brigade reserve. This time things did not go so well: 15th Cheshires lost its way in the mist crossing the wasteland that had been fought over so many times before, and the brigade found itself attacking Zandvoorde from the west instead of the north-west, and was met by heavy machine gun fire from the ruins which had been thought to be unoccupied. A light creeping barrage called down from the available artillery failed to disturb the dug-in machine gunners, so 4th North Staffs and 15th Sherwoods were ordered to envelop the village from both sides. The turning movement succeeded, but it had taken all day to capture the village. 15th Sherwoods then took up positions on the northern side of Tenbrielen. 106th Brigade continued the attack on 30 September and 15th Sherwoods went into reserve. The battalion had only suffered 14 casualties in the three days of fighting.

On the night of 5/6 October 105th Bde marched up the Menin Road and took over the front line, which consisted of a series of detached posts. These were heavily shelled on 7 October and Lt-Col Crellin was wounded. He died of his wounds the following day at 10th Casualty Clearing Station, aged 25. He was buried at Lijssenthoek Military Cemetery. Major H. Morton took over command with Maj A.S Johnson as second-in-command

35th Division resumed operations on 14 October (the Battle of Courtrai). 105th (left) and 104th (right) Bdes had an awkward attack to make, the objective lying obliquely across the line of advance. To guide them the artillery fired thermite (incendiary) shells to mark the divisional boundary. The planned advance was ambitious at 7–8,000 yards (6.4–7,315.2 m), which meant that the artillery would have to shift position to maintain the barrage in front. 15th Sherwoods were in brigade support and assembled at 03.00 500 yards (460 m)behind 15th Cheshires. At Zero (05.35) the Cheshires advanced behind the barrage and encountered little opposition in reaching the first objective. The Sherwoods then passed through and continued the advance in dense mist, which made direction-keeping difficult, and the battalion got too far to the right. Apart from some gas shelling it only met real resistance when it approached 'Cabin Copse', when it came under fire from field guns firing over open sights before limbering up and dashing away under cover of machine gun fire. The Sherwoods shot down some of the teams and captured two of these guns. By midday 105th Bde was consolidating on its final objective, finding that the low ridges between Wevelghem and Gulleghem, about 0.5 miles (0.80 km) in front, were held in considerable strength. Next day 4th North Staffords passed through to capture the Wevelghem– Gulleghem road, and over the next two days 35th Division closed up to the River Lys. 105th Brigade was in reserve when the Lys was bridged and crossed but on the morning of 19 October it took up the lead, a patrol from 15th Sherwoods reporting that Courtrai was unoccupied.

35th Division resumed its advance on 20 October. (Note: This action does not seem to have been named by the Battles Nomenclature Committee in 1921 or in the subsequent Official History, but the divisional history refers to it as 'The Battle of Sweveghem'.) There was no barrage, but each battalion had a section of field guns attached to it and the troops were ordered to advance as in open warfare. They moved off at 04.45 and 15th Sherwoods advanced from the Beekstraat spur at Zero (05.45) with 15th Cheshires to the right and 4th North Staffords to the left. The leading companies were hindered by machine guns, and when they reached the outskirts of Sweveghem they were held up both by the machine guns and by the Cheshires lagging behind. The field guns now came up and bombarded the village and the Sherwoods fought their way in. The enemy also brought down a heavy barrage, turning the Sherwoods out again, but this was to cover their own retreat and they evacuated the village. At 15.00 the battalion marched through the village to capture some farm buildings on the Kreupel ridge beyond at about 16.00. Next day another division passed through to take up this line and the battalion withdrew to billets in Courtrai where they were welcomed by the people of the liberated city.

35th Division returned to the front on the night of 26/27 October, with 15th Sherwoods in reserve billets in Esscher and at Lock No 6 on the Bossuit–Kortrijk Canal, west of Sweveghem. The battalion took no part in the division's attack up to the River Scheldt at Tiegem on 31 October. It moved back to billets at Marke while the engineers prepared for an assault crossing of the Scheldt. On 4 November the battalion was ordered up to the front line under 106th Bde, establishing its HQ at Otegem and posting Y Company along the river bank where 105th Bde was to attack. Over the next few days the battalion carried out intense patrolling along the west bank of the river. On 6 November Lt-Col Morton went to hospital and Maj Johnson took command. The attack was scheduled for 11 November, but during the night of 8/9 November the Germans pulled back from the river and 105th Bde was ordered to scramble across using any means possible. 15th Sherwoods had no means of crossing ready to hand, but at 07.00 the following morning crossed by ferries and temporary bridges provided by the REs. Its orders were to assemble along the Berchem railway. A general advance was then ordered at 12.00 and the battalion met no opposition in taking up its assigned line 4,000 yards (3,700 m) further on, where it pushed forward outposts. Next day 104th Bde passed through to continue the pursuit eastwards and 15th Sherwoods took up billets at Zandstraat. That night came word that the Armistice with Germany would come into force at 11.00 next morning (11 November), and the division was ordered to make every effort to reach the River Dendre by then. 105th Brigade was at Audenhove when hostilities ended.

=== Post-Armistice ===
On 13 November, 35th Division began a march back to billets in the St Omer area, arriving on 2 December, with 15th Sherwoods billeted at Monnecove outside Bayenghem-lès-Éperlecques. Demobilisation began for key workers, and the first batch of ex-miners from division was sent home on 11 December. During January 1919 8 officers and 229 ORs were demobilised from 15th Sherwoods. At the end of January 1919 trouble broke out among troops awaiting demobilisation at camps round Calais. The division was sent to restore order, and 15th Sherwoods sent a detachment of 16 officers and 300 Ors by lorry to 'Beaumaris Camp' on 28 January. They were posted at bridgeheads along the canal to prevent rioters leaving No 6 Camp. The disturbances had been quelled by 30 January but 105th Bde remained there for two months. By the end of February the battalion had dwindled to 24 officers and 208 ORs. War-formed battalions were granted a King's Colour: 15th Sherwoods received its colour at a parade on 14 March. On 25 March the battalion returned by rail to billets in Monnecove. Demobilisation continued until the units of 35th Division had been reduced to cadres. On 18 April 15th Sherwoods sent 3 officers and 73 ORs remaining with the army to Le Havre and the following day the battalion cadre entrained at St Omer for Dunkirk. It loaded the stores aboard the SS Cluna and the personnel embarked on the Russian ship Viagaitch, arriving at Southampton on 22 April. The battalion. was formally disbanded on 24 April 1919

During its service, the battalion had suffered casualties of 25 officers and 315 ORs killed, 51 officers and 1368 ORs wounded, and 14 officers and 452 men missing.

== Insignia ==
Apart from the Sherwood Foresters' cap badge and 'NOTTS AND DERBY' brass shoulder title the 15th Battalion wore no special badges for most of its service. However, towards the end of World War I it probably began wearing the second version of the 35th Divisional sign with a circle of seven '5s'.

== Battle Honours ==
15th Sherwoods was awarded the following Battle honours:

- France & Flanders
- Somme 1916
- Bazentin
- Ypres 1917
- Passchendaele
- Somme 1918
- Bapaume 1918
- Ypres 1918
- Courtrai

It was the only battalion of the Sherwood Foresters to receive the honours for Bazentin, Ypres 1918 and Courtrai.

== Memorials ==
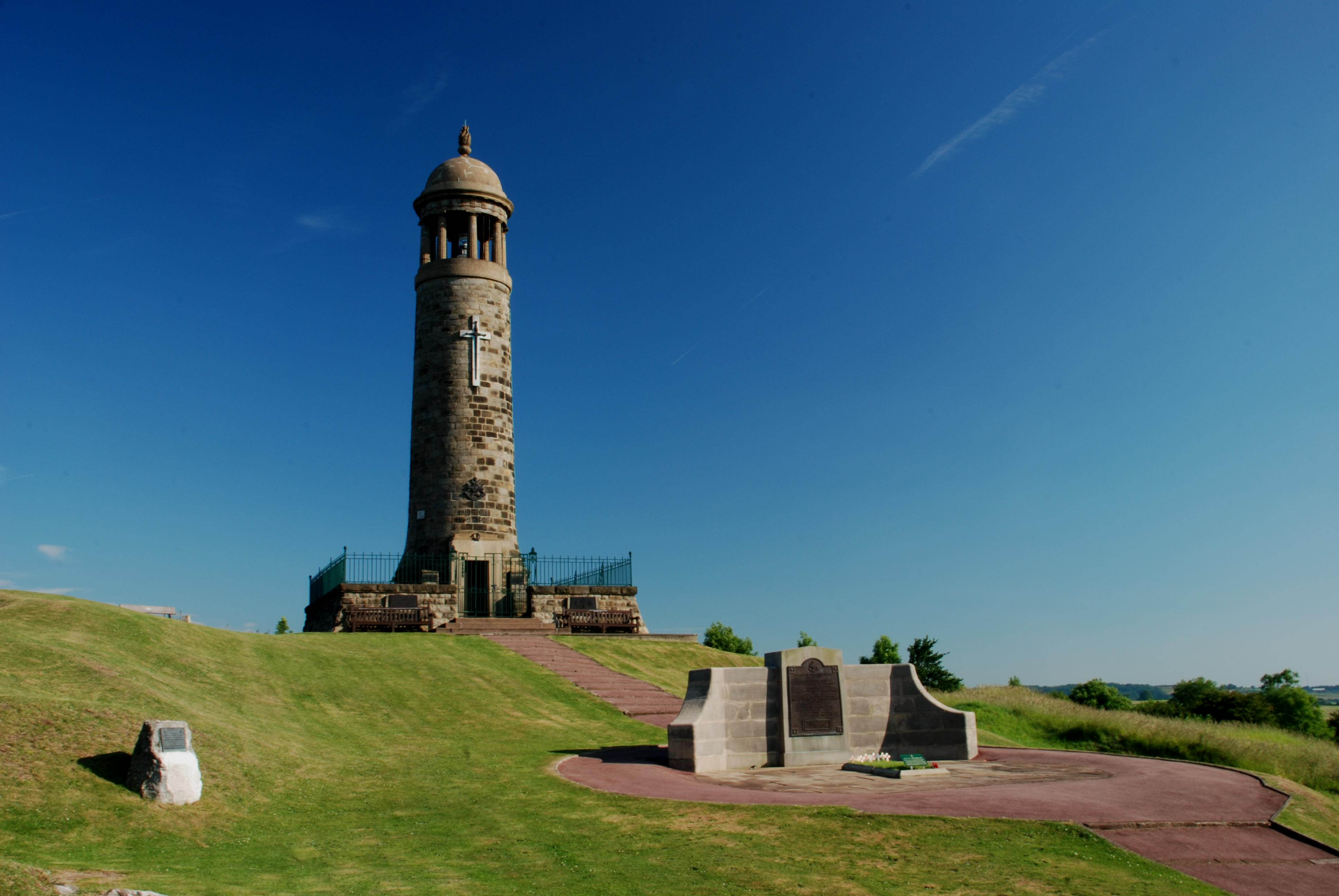
The Sherwood Foresters' memorial at Crich Stand

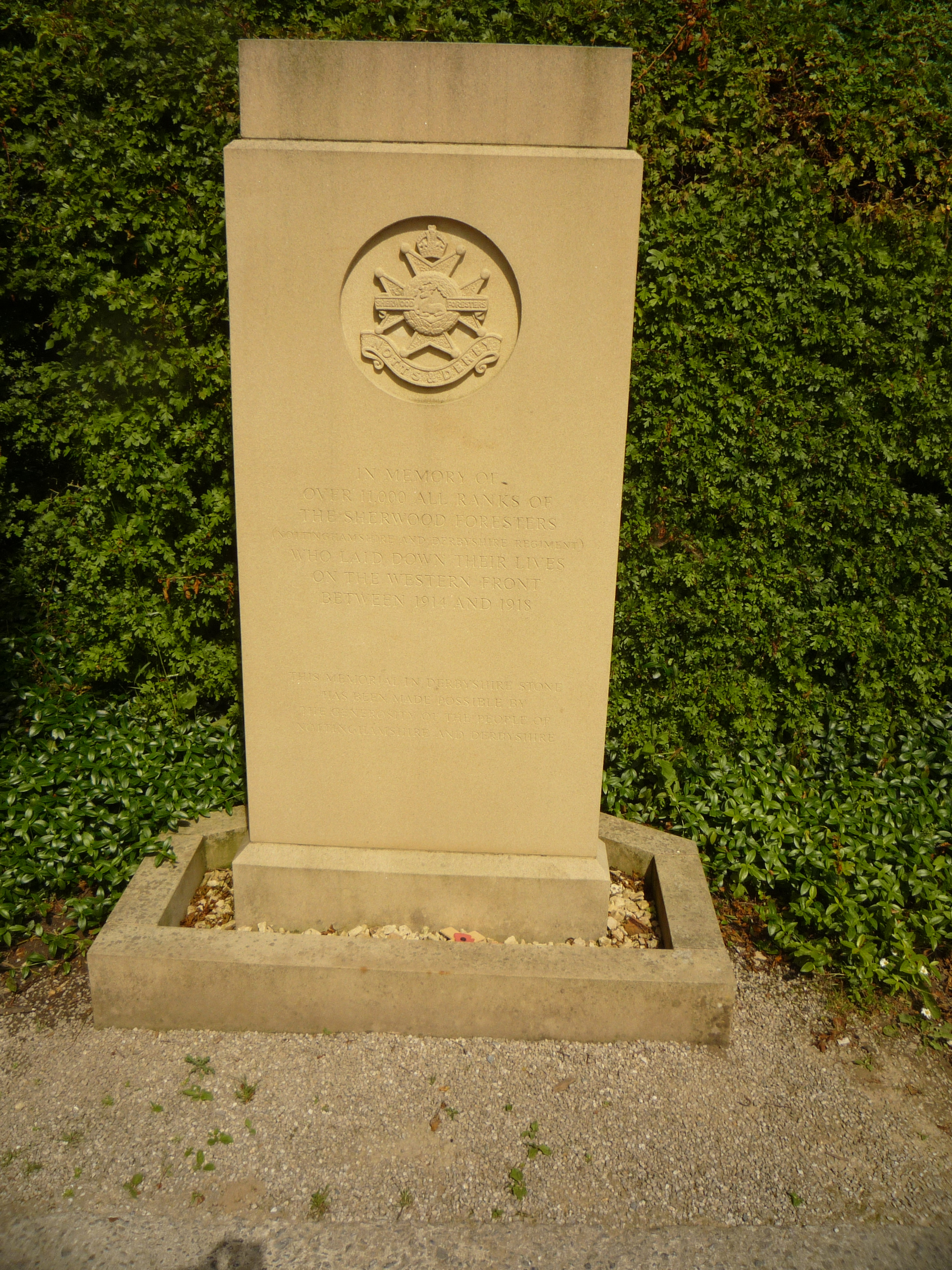
The Sherwood Foresters' memorial at Tyne Cot

The Sherwood Foresters' war memorial, known as Crich Stand, consists of a tower topped by a lantern erected in 1923 on a prominent hillside overlooking the village of Crich, close to the Nottinghamshire–Derbyshire boundary. Bronze memorial plaques referring to the monument on Crich Hill were later placed in a number of town and villages in the two counties, including one at St Peter's Church, Nottingham.

A modern Derbyshire stone memorial to those of the Sherwood Foresters who died on the Western Front was erected behind the Commonwealth War Graves Commission's Tyne Cot Monument in 2009.
