= 1st Anzac Entrenching Battalion =

- Active: 1916–1917
- Country: Australia
- Branch: First Australian Imperial Force
- Role: Infantry training (1916); Tunnelling (1916–1917)
- Engagements: World War I

The 1st Anzac Entrenching Battalion was a First Australian Imperial Force (AIF) battalion of World War I. It was formed in June 1916 with the role of preparing soldiers for combat with the AIF's infantry battalions. From September that year until the battalion's disbandment in October 1917 it was used as a tunnelling unit.

== History ==
The 1st Anzac Entrenching Battalion was formed at La Motte in France on 6 June 1916. Like the other British Empire entrenching battalions, the unit was initially used to hold reinforcement infantrymen for I ANZAC Corps. Soldiers were posted to the battalion after completing initial infantry training in the United Kingdom and further training at the base depots of the AIF divisions in France. The role of the 1st Anzac Entrenching Battalion was to accelerate and improve the training process by providing reinforcement infantrymen with exposure to combat conditions while undertaking engineering works near the front line.

The battalion initially provided all infantry reinforcements for the I ANZAC Corps, but all of its personnel were posted to combat units as part of the response to the heavy casualties suffered by the Australian units involved in the Battle of Pozières between July and September 1916. While it ceased to provide training to infantrymen, the 1st Anzac Entrenching Battalion's headquarters and staff were retained and the unit absorbed the surplus reinforcements for the AIF's tunnelling companies; these comprised 9 officers and 203 other ranks. The battalion subsequently operated as a tunnelling unit on the Western Front alongside Canadian tunnellers. It was disbanded on 20 October 1917.
