= Aveluy Wood Cemetery =

Cemetery located in Somme, in France

Aveluy Wood Cemetery (Lancashire Dump)
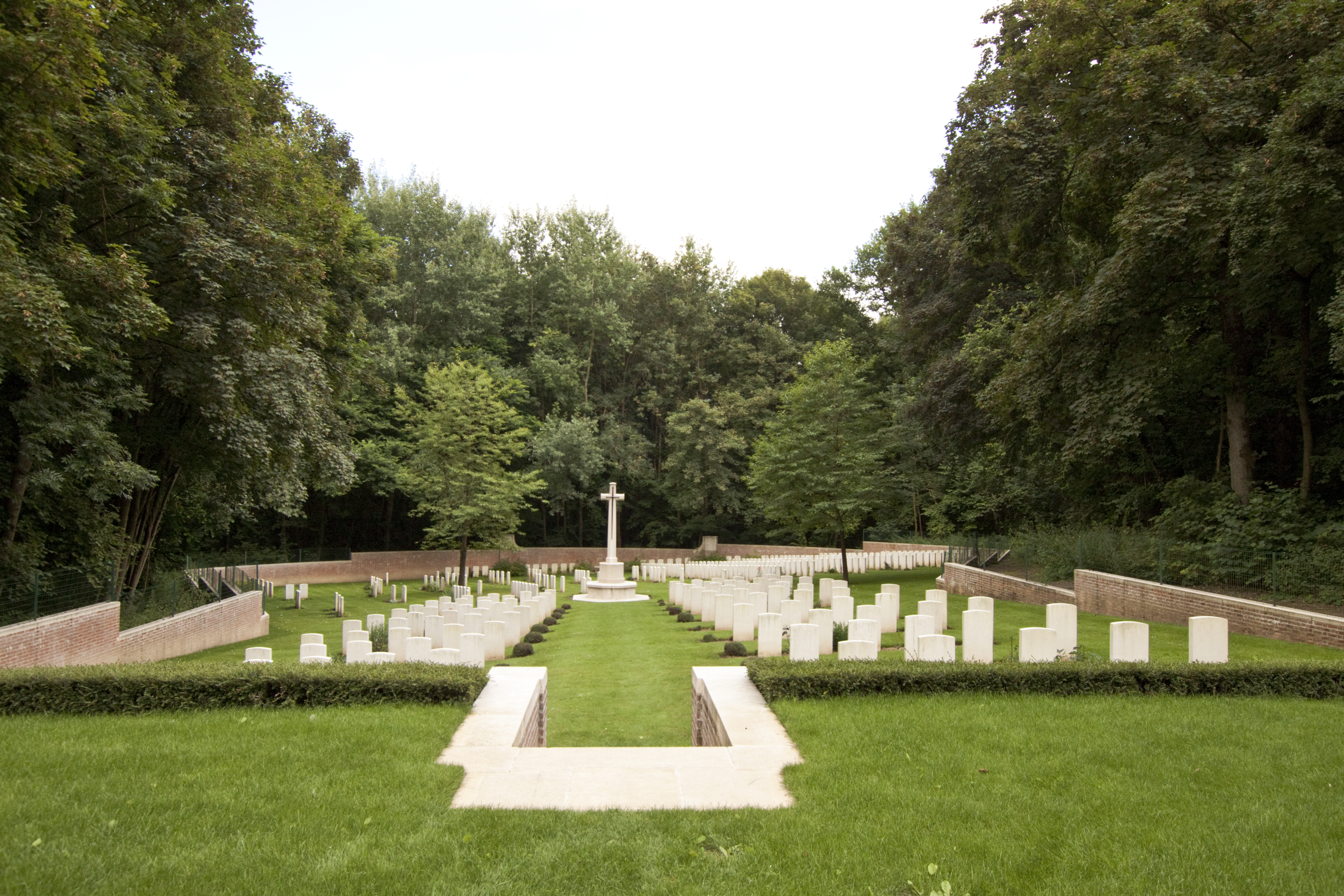

Details
- Established: June 1916
- Location: Mesnil-Martinsart, Somme, France
- Country: British and Commonwealth
- Coordinates: 50.04527°N 2.66027°E
- Type: Military
- No. of graves: 380+ total, 209 identified
- Website: cwgc.org
- Find a Grave: Aveluy Wood Cemetery

The Aveluy Wood Cemetery (also known as the Lancashire Dump) is a cemetery located in the Somme region of France commemorating British and Commonwealth soldiers who fought in the Battle of the Somme in World War I. The cemetery honors mainly those who died on the front near Aveluy Wood and the village of Aveluy from June 1916 to February 1917 and from April to September 1918.

== Location ==
The cemetery is located in Mesnil-Martinsart, near the D50 road and the village of Aveluy, which is approximately 5 km north of the town of Albert, France.

== Fighting around Aveluy Wood ==
The British 32nd and 36th divisions held the area near Aveluy Wood (which they called "Lancashire Dump") from the beginning of the Battle of the Somme on 1 July 1916 to the German retreat to the Hindenburg Line in February 1917. The Germans returned to the wood on the night of 26 March 1918 as part of the final major German offensive in Western Europe, and had taken the area from the 12th Eastern, 47th London, and 63rd Royal Naval divisions by 5 April. The wood was then repeatedly attacked by Allied forces until it was recaptured in August 1918.

== Establishment of the Cemetery ==
=== History ===
The cemetery was begun in June 1916, a few days before the beginning of the First Battle of the Somme. It was used by units and field ambulances until the German withdrawal to the Hindenburg Line in February 1917. The cemetery remained mostly unused until the spring 1918 German offensive, when more graves were added to Row H of Plot I. After the end of the war, Plots II and III were created and filled with graves moved in from Aveluy Wood. In 1923, 124 more graves (Rows I to M of Plot I) were brought in from a wider area. The cemetery was designed by Sir Richard Blomfield.

=== Layout ===
The cemetery is flanked on both sides by low hedges, and is located several steps under ground level. It is fan shaped, with a Cross of Sacrifice located in the middle and a stone bench with the names of the missing inscribed on the sides located in the back.

=== Statistics ===
The cemetery contains a total of around 380 burials, of which 209 are identified and 171 are unidentified. There are special memorials dedicated to 20 soldiers known to be buried among the unknown.

Identified Burials by Nationality
Nation	Number of Burials
United Kingdom	192
Australia	17

Number of Burials by Unit
West Yorkshire Regiment	23	Sherwood Foresters - Notts. & Derbys. Regiment	20
Royal Naval Division	18	Australian units	17
Royal Fusiliers - City of London Regiment	13	Bedfordshire Regiment	11
Duke of Wellington's - West Riding Regiment	7	Royal Welsh Fusiliers	7
King's Own Yorkshire Light Infantry	6	Lancashire Fusiliers	6
Royal Irish Rifles	6	Royal Army Medical Corps	5
Royal Engineers	5	Royal Sussex Regiment	5
Hampshire Regiment	4	5th Bn. London Regiment - London Rifle Brigade	4
Monmouthshire Regiment	3	Northumberland Fusiliers	3
Rifle Brigade	3	York & Lancaster Regiment	3
Cheshire Regiment	2	Dorsetshire Regiment	2
Highland Light Infantry	2	King's Royal Rifle Corps	2
24th Bn. London Regiment - The Queen's	2	Manchester Regiment	2
Royal Field Artillery	2	Royal Garrison Artillery	2
Royal Horse Artillery	2	Buffs - East Kent Regiment	1
Durham Light Infantry	1	East Yorkshire Regiment	1
Essex Regiment	1	King's Own Scottish Borderers	1
Leicestershire Regiment	1	17th Bn. London Regiment - Poplar & Stepney Rifles	1
22nd Bn. London Regiment - The Queen's	1	Middlesex Regiment	1
Royal Dublin Fusiliers	1	Royal Inniskilling Fusiliers	1
Royal Scots	1	Royal West Kent Regiment - Queen's Own	1
Somerset Light Infantry	1	South Staffordshire Regiment	1
South Wales Borderers	1	Suffolk Regiment	1
Welch Regiment	1		
