= Entrenching battalions =

British soldiers from the Cheshire Regiment man a trench during the First World War

Entrenching battalions were temporary units formed in the armies of the British Empire during the First World War. Entrenching Battalions were trained as infantry, but were primarily utilized for manual labour duties such as trench repair, wire laying, road making and assisting tunnellers, pioneers, engineers and signals. The Battalions were also used as pools of men from which drafts of replacements could be drawn by conventional infantry battalions.

== Australian Battalions ==
1st Anzac Entrenching Battalion
Formed in 1916 and provided a reinforcement pool to I ANZAC Corps. After the heavy casualties suffered during the Battle of Pozières between July and September 1916 the battalions remaining manpower was absorbed by the Australian Infantry battalions. The 1st Anzac Entrenching Battalion later absorbed the surplus reinforcements for the Australian tunnelling companies and worked with the Canadian tunnellers at Ypres. The battalion was disbanded in late 1917.

== British Battalions ==
Entrenching battalions were first formed in the British Army in July 1916 and were allocated at Corps level. The practice ceased on the Western Front by autumn 1917, due to manpower shortages, but saw a revival at the start of 1918. The reduction in the number of battalions in an infantry brigade (from four to three) resulted in many (under-manned) infantry battalions being disbanded. Following the disbandment of these infantry battalions in February 1918, the pool of men was used to bring the remaining battalions up to strength, and to allocate any remaining manpower surplus to 25 entrenching battalions. These battalions were put to use in improving the existing defences in anticipation of a German offensive, and could be used as a reserve force if needed.

The entrenching battalions were disbanded in April 1918, with their troops apportioned to infantry battalions to make good the losses suffered following Operation Michael, which began the German spring offensive of 1918. Many of their war diaries from 1918 have survived and can be consulted at the National Archives at Kew though the 1918 war diaries for the 1st, 6th, 7th, 10th, 13th, 15th and 17th Entrenching Battalions have not survived.

The following entrenching battalions were formed:

1st Entrenching Battalion
The Battalion appears to have been stationed in Salonika in 1918.
2nd Entrenching Battalion
The Battalion appears to have been stationed in Salonika in 1918. The unit was commanded by Hubert Carr-Gomm.
3rd Entrenching Battalion
Formed from a number of battalion elements.
4th Entrenching Battalion
Formed primarily from the disbanded 13th Battalion East Yorkshire Regiment, and a small number of former members of 14th Battalion York and Lancaster Regiment (a.k.a. 2nd Barnsley Pals), although many of the 2nd Barnsley Pals were to join the 1st Barnsley Pals.
5th Entrenching Battalion
Formed from the 13th Battalion Cheshire Regiment, 8th Battalion Bedfordshire Regiment, 9th Battalion Suffolk Regiment and 8th Battalion Loyal North Lancashire Regiment.
6th Entrenching Battalion
Formed from the 11th Battalion Kings Own (Royal Lancaster) Regiment.
7th Entrenching Battalion
Formed from the Nelson Battalion, Royal Naval Division, and 8th (Service) Battalion, The South Staffordshire Regiment.
8th Entrenching Battalion
Formed from the 10th and 19th (Service) Battalions of the Royal Welsh Fusiliers.
9th Entrenching Battalion
Formed from the 3rd Battalion, Monmouthshire Regiment.
10th Entrenching Battalion
Formed from the disbanded 8th Battalion East Yorkshire Regiment and 12th Battalion West Yorkshire Regiment. Disbanded on 5 April 1918. These men subsequently joined the 7th Battalion East Yorkshire Regiment and 10th Battalion West Yorkshire Regiment.
11th Entrenching Battalion
Formed on 20 February 1918 from the battalion headquarters and residue of the disbanded 3/10th Battalion, Middlesex Regiment, and the residue of the Household Battalion (a battalion raised from the Household Cavalry). Joined on 16 March 1918 by the residue of the 11th (Service) Battalion, Queen's Own Royal West Kent Regiment (Lewisham), just arrived from Italy and disbanded on the Western Front. The battalion was working under XVII Corps in Third Army when the German spring offensive opened. It manned and improved the 'Purple Line' near Arras, but there was no breakthrough there, and at the end of the month the battalion was moved behind the Amiens sector until the end of the Michael offensive.
12th Entrenching Battalion
Formed from elements of four disbanded battalions of 35th Division: 23rd (Service) Battalion, Manchester Regiment (8th City), 20th (Service) Battalion, Lancashire Fusiliers (4th Salford), 16th (Service) Battalion, Cheshire Regiment (2nd Birkenhead), and 14th (Service) Battalion, Gloucestershire Regiment (West of England). Battalion headquarters of 23rd Manchesters transferred to the 12th Entrenching Bn and the commanding officer until 18 March was Lieutenant Colonel L.M. Stevens, DSO, from that battalion. During the German spring offensive it was engaged in heavy fighting in the defence of the Crozat Canal, after which it was absorbed into 7th Royal West Kent Regiment.
13th Entrenching Battalion
Formed from the 10th (Service) Battalion, Gloucestershire Regiment.
14th Entrenching Battalion
Formed from the 7th Battalion, Kings Own Yorkshire Light Infantry.
15th Entrenching Battalion
Formed from the 8th Battalion, East Lancaster Regiment.
16th Entrenching Battalion
Formed from half of the disbanded 6th Battalion King's Own Yorkshire Light Infantry.
17th Entrenching Battalion
Formed from elements of the 18th Battalion Manchester Regiment. The battalion was with the 49th (West Riding) Division during the Spring Offensive.
18th Entrenching Battalion
Formed from the 12th Battalion, Middlesex Regiment.
19th Entrenching Battalion
Formed from the 10th (Service) Battalion, Royal Dublin Fusiliers, 7th (Service) Battalion, Leinster Regiment and details from the 16th (Irish) Division.
20th Entrenching Battalion
Formed from men of the 3/4th (T.F.) Battalion Queen's Royal Regiment (West Surrey), 8th and 9th (Service) Battalion Royal Dublin Fusiliers, 9th (Service) Battalion Leicestershire Regiment, 10th (Service) Yorkshire Regiment, 10th (Service) King's Own Yorkshire Light Infantry, 14th (Service) Hampshire Regiment and 3rd South African Infantry Regiment.
21st Entrenching Battalion
Formed from the 10th Battalion, Royal Irish Rifles.
22nd Entrenching Battalion
Formed from the 11/13th Royal Irish Rifles.
23rd Entrenching Battalion
Formed from the 14th Battalion Royal Irish Rifles and 11th Battalion Royal Inniskilling Fusiliers.
24th Entrenching Battalion
Formed from the 2/5th (T.F.) Battalion Royal Warwickshire Regiment, the 2/4th and 2/6th (T.F.) Battalions Gloucestershire Regiment.
25th Entrenching Battalion
Formed from the 2/1st Buckinghamshire Battalion, the 2/7th and 2/8th (T.F.) Battalions Royal Warwickshire Regiment. These men subsequently joined the 2/4th Oxfordshire & Buckinghamshire Light Infantry when the battalion was disbanded in April 1918.

== Canadian Battalions ==
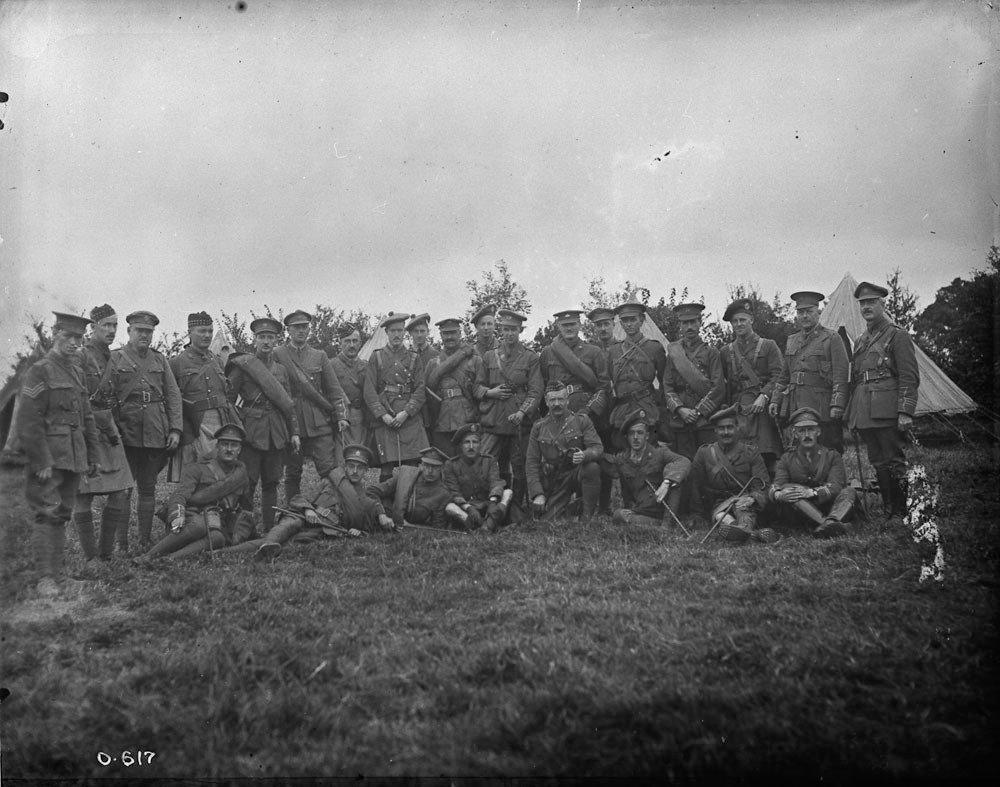
Officers of the 1st Canadian Entrenching Battalion, 1916

The Canadian Expeditionary Force formed four entrenching battalions in July 1916, one for each of the respective divisions. They were disbanded in September 1917 with the creation of the Canadian Corps Reinforcement Camp.

1st Canadian Entrenching Battalion
Attached to the 1st Canadian Division
2nd Canadian Entrenching Battalion
Attached to the 2nd Canadian Division
3rd Canadian Entrenching Battalion
Attached to the 3rd Canadian Division
4th Canadian Entrenching Battalion
Attached to the 4th Canadian Division

== New Zealand Battalions ==
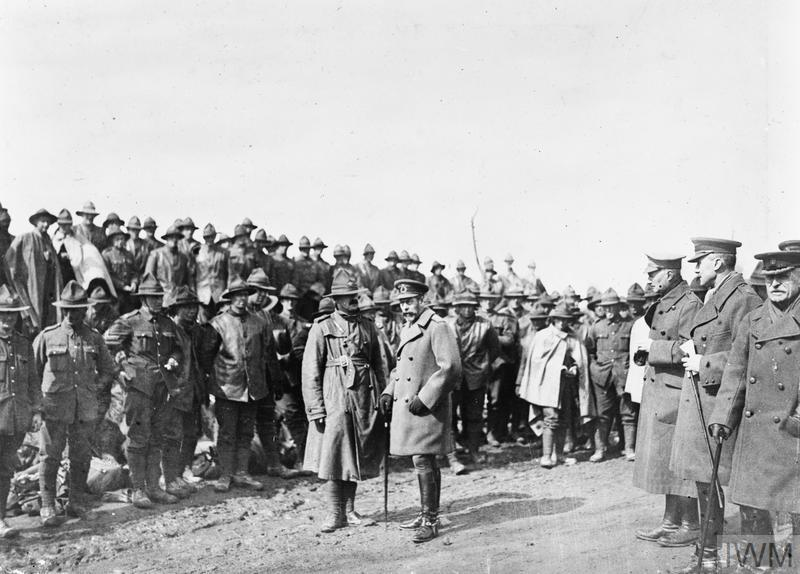
King George V inspecting the 1st New Zealand Entrenching Battalion

The New Zealand Expeditionary Force formed the New Zealand Entrenching Group in February 1918. It consisted of three entrenching battalions with the manpower drawn from men of the disbanded 4th New Zealand Infantry Brigade. Each of the Battalions was attached to one of the remaining three New Zealand Infantry brigades. The Entrenching Battalions were disbanded in October 1918.

1st New Zealand Entrenching Battalion
Attached to the 1st New Zealand Infantry Brigade. Formed from men of the Auckland and Wellington infantry regiments
2nd New Zealand Entrenching Battalion
Attached to the 2nd New Zealand Infantry Brigade. Formed from men of the Canterbury and Otago infantry regiments. Became serious engaged in the Battle of the Lys in April 1918, taking 400 casualties.
3rd New Zealand Entrenching Battalion
Attached to the 3rd New Zealand (Rifle) Brigade. Formed from men of the New Zealand Rifle Brigade
