= Bouquemaison =

- Commune
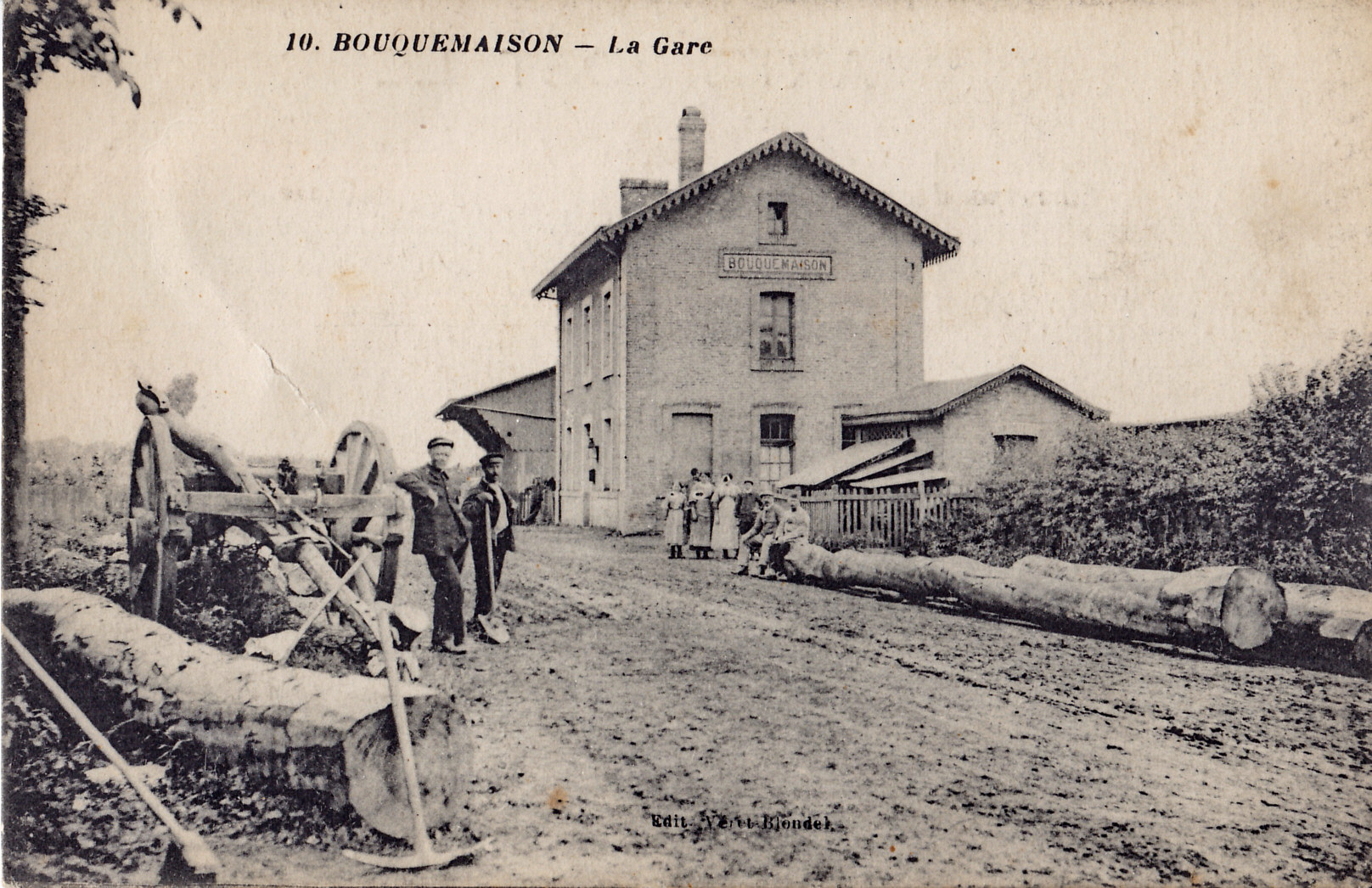
- Bouquemaison railway station in the early 20th century
- Location of Bouquemaison
- Location within France Location within Hauts-de-France
- Coordinates: 50°12′43″N 2°20′17″E
- Country: France
- Region: Hauts-de-France
- Department: Somme
- Arrondissement: Amiens
- Canton: Doullens
- Intercommunality: CC Territoire Nord Picardie

Government
  - Mayor (2024–2026): Brigitte Devillers
- Area^{1}: 7.15 km^{2} (2.76 sq mi)
- Elevation: 143 m (469 ft)
- Highest elevation: 159 m (522 ft)
- Lowest elevation: 95 m (312 ft)
- Population (2023): 493
  - Density: 69.0/km^{2} (179/sq mi)
- Time zone: UTC+01:00 (CET)
  - Summer (DST): UTC+02:00 (CEST)
- INSEE/Postal code: 80122 /80600
- ^{1} French Land Register data, which excludes lakes, ponds, glaciers > 1 km^{2} (0.386 sq mi or 247 acres) and river estuaries.

Bouquemaison (French pronunciation: [bukmɛzɔ̃]; Picard: Bouque-Moaison) is a commune in the Somme department in Hauts-de-France in northern France.

== Geography ==
Bouquemaison is situated on the D196 and D916 road junction, some 26 miles (42 km) north of Amiens.

== Population ==
Historical population
Year	Pop.	±% p.a.
1968	517	—
1975	490	−0.76%
1982	466	−0.71%
1990	460	−0.16%
1999	485	+0.59%
2007	488	+0.08%
2012	543	+2.16%
2017	503	−1.52%
2023	493	−0.33%
Source: INSEE

== See also ==
- Communes of the Somme department
