= Elverdinge =

Village in West Flanders, Belgium

Coordinates: 50°53′00″N 2°49′00″E

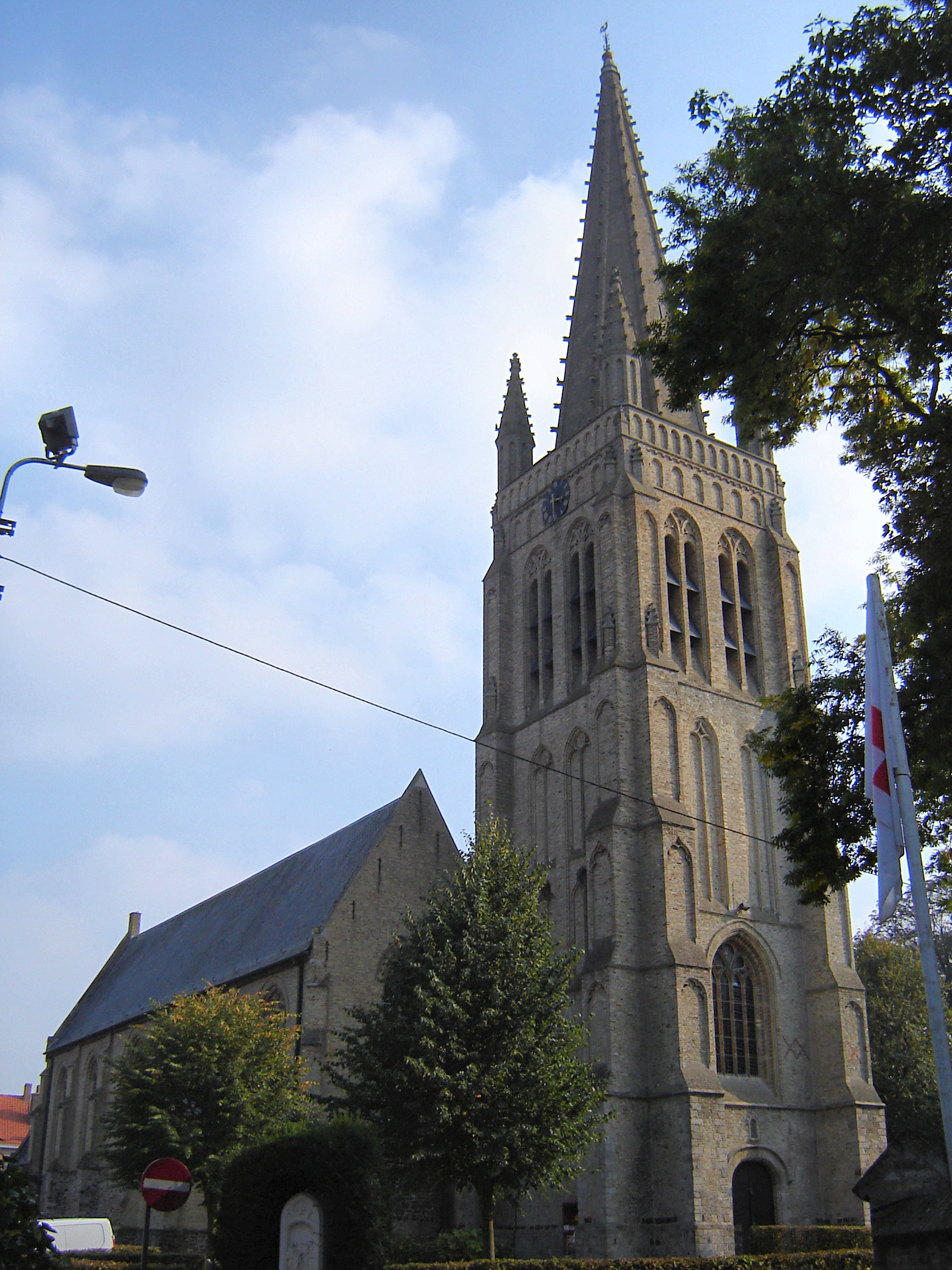
The Saint-Peter and Paul Church

Elverdinge is a village in the Flemish province of West Flanders in Belgium. The village is part of the municipality of Ypres (Dutch: leper).

In World War I, the village was part of the Ypres Salient, a bulge in the front lines around Ypres in WWI, created in late 1914 after the front stabilised and the Allied and German armies dug in around the town.

There are 5 Commonwealth War Graves Commission Cemeteries in Elverdinge:

- Bleuet Farm Cemetery
- Canada Farm Cemetery
- Ferme-Olivier Cemetery
- Hagle Dump Cemetery
- Hospital Farm Cemetery.
