= Villers-Guislain =

- Commune
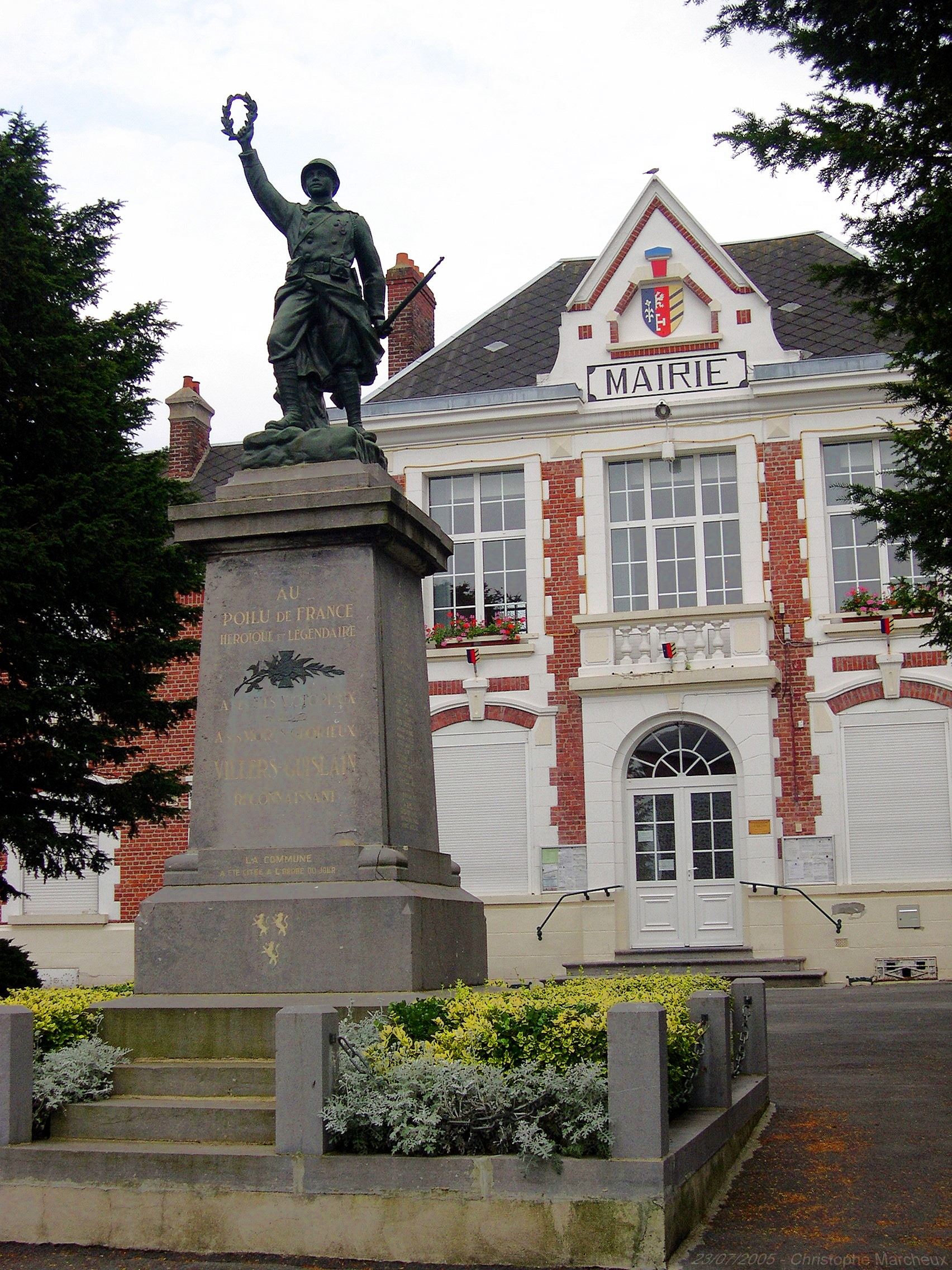
- The town hall in Villers-Guislain

- Coat of arms
- Location of Villers-Guislain
- Location within France Location within Hauts-de-France
- Coordinates: 50°02′27″N 3°09′23″E
- Country: France
- Region: Hauts-de-France
- Department: Nord
- Arrondissement: Cambrai
- Canton: Le Cateau-Cambrésis
- Intercommunality: CA Cambrai

Government
  - Mayor (2020–2026): Gérard Allart
- Area^{1}: 11.27 km^{2} (4.35 sq mi)
- Elevation: 136 m (446 ft)
- Highest elevation: 141 m (463 ft)
- Lowest elevation: 86 m (282 ft)
- Population (2023): 684
  - Density: 60.7/km^{2} (157/sq mi)
- Time zone: UTC+01:00 (CET)
  - Summer (DST): UTC+02:00 (CEST)
- INSEE/Postal code: 59623 /59297
- ^{1} French Land Register data, which excludes lakes, ponds, glaciers > 1 km^{2} (0.386 sq mi or 247 acres) and river estuaries.

Villers-Guislain (French pronunciation: [vilɛʁ ɡilɛ̃]) is a commune in the Nord department in northern France. The graveyard at Gauche Wood contains the casualties who died during the Battle of Épehy when British troops were deployed between Gouzeaucourt and Villers-Guislain.

== Heraldry ==
Arms of Villers-Guislain	The arms of Villers-Guislain are blazoned : Tierced per pale 1: Azure, a ?fleur de? lys argent; 2: Gules, a demi- doubleheaded eagle and a demi-cross potenty argent, both issuant from the dexter line of division; 3: Or, 3 fesses azure.

== See also ==
- Communes of the Nord department
