= Aveluy =

- Commune
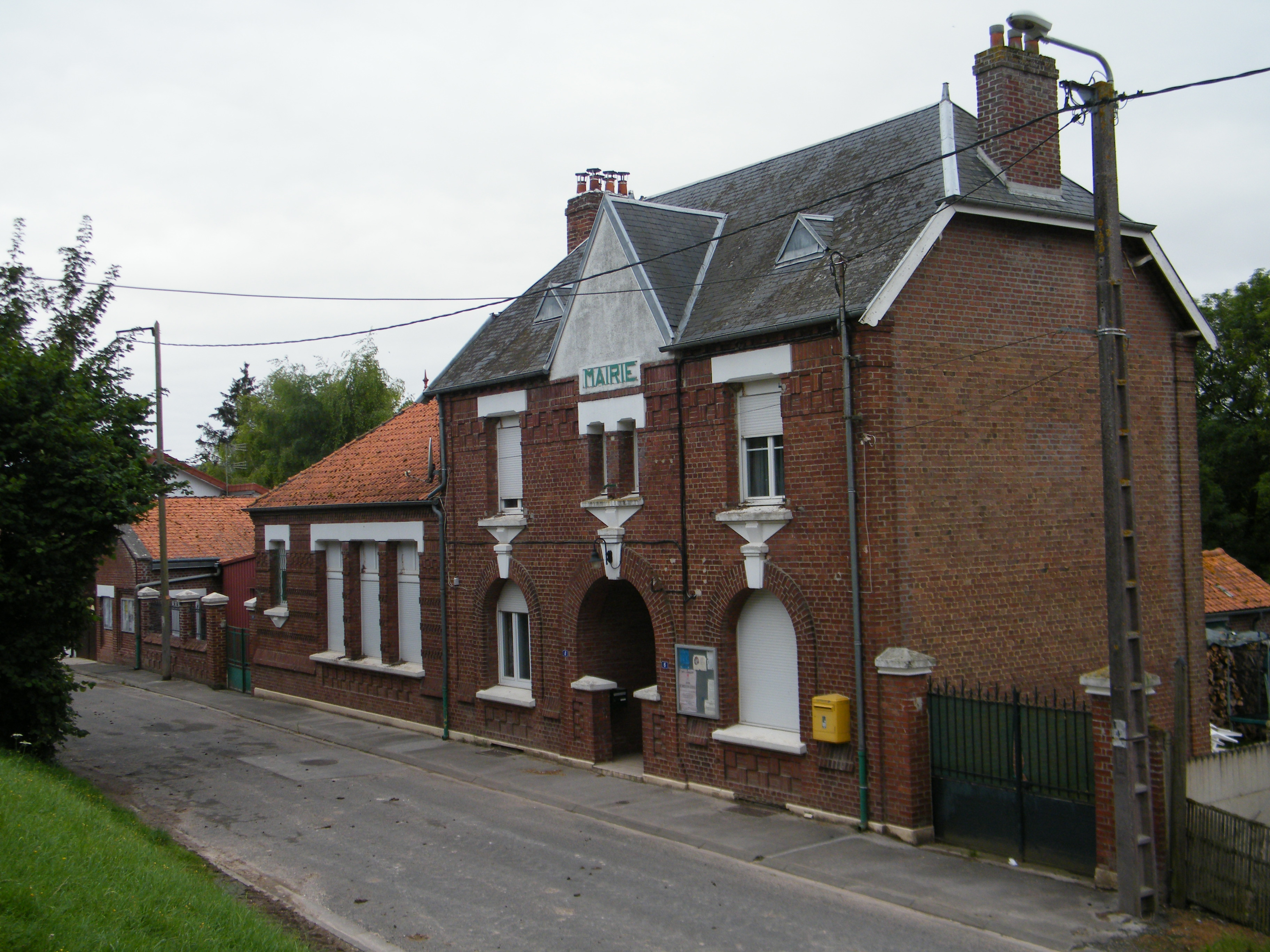
- The town hall and school in Aveluy
- Location of Aveluy
- Location within France Location within Hauts-de-France
- Coordinates: 50°01′27″N 2°39′32″E
- Country: France
- Region: Hauts-de-France
- Department: Somme
- Arrondissement: Péronne
- Canton: Albert
- Intercommunality: CC Pays Coquelicot

Government
  - Mayor (2020–2026): Christophe Buisset
- Area^{1}: 6.64 km^{2} (2.56 sq mi)
- Elevation: 72 m (236 ft)
- Highest elevation: 129 m (423 ft)
- Lowest elevation: 57 m (187 ft)
- Population (2023): 540
  - Density: 81/km^{2} (210/sq mi)
- Time zone: UTC+01:00 (CET)
  - Summer (DST): UTC+02:00 (CEST)
- INSEE/Postal code: 80047 /80300
- ^{1} French Land Register data, which excludes lakes, ponds, glaciers > 1 km^{2} (0.386 sq mi or 247 acres) and river estuaries.

Aveluy (French pronunciation: [avlɥi]) is a commune in the Somme department in Hauts-de-France in northern France.

== See also ==
- Communes of the Somme department
