= Joseph Stones =

British Army soldier

Joseph William Stones
- Born: 1892; Crook, County Durham
- Died: 18 January 1917 (aged 24) near Arras, France
- Military career
- Allegiance: United Kingdom
- Branch: British Army
- Rank: Lance Sergeant
- Unit: Durham Light Infantry
- Conflicts: First World War: Western Front

Lance Sergeant Joseph William Stones (1892 – 18 January 1917) was a British soldier during the First World War who was executed for shameful casting away his arms in the presence of the enemy. He later became the first Briton so executed to have his name added to a war memorial.

== Background ==
Stones was born and grew up in Crook, County Durham, and worked as a miner before the war. When the war began in 1914 he volunteered to join the British Army, but was rejected because he was too short in height. By 1915 the army had lowered its requirements, and Stones joined the 19th Battalion, Durham Light Infantry in 1915. He was commended for his bravery several times, and fought in the Battle of the Somme.

== Night of 26 November 1916 and subsequent military legal proceedings ==
The incident for which he was executed occurred in the trenches near Arras on 26 November 1916. Stones was charged with shameful casting away his arms and appeared before a court martial on Christmas Eve 1916. Stones was defended by Captain Walmington, a 40 year old qualified solicitor. According to his statement at his court martial, his officer, Lieutenant James Mundy, mortally wounded during an encounter with a German patrol approaching the British trenches, ordered him to go for help. Stones was next seen by a Sgt Foster at a battle post about 700 yards from the front line. In evidence Foster testified that Stones was without his rifle and bayonet. He was later described as being 'in a pitiable state of terror.' Stones testified that he was unable to fire his rifle because its safety catch was on and the cover was over the breech, so he had jammed it across the trench and abandoned it to slow down what he took for a German raiding party entering the British line, whilst he withdrew to the rear seeking help. This explanation has been challenged by historian Gordon Corrigan who noted that a rifle placed across a trench does not constitute a barrier, and a far more practical method of slowing the Germans would simply be to open fire on them. Removal of the breech cover takes less than a second.

In spite of Stones' statement as to the order that he had received, and one from his company commander that: "he is the last man I would have thought capable of any cowardly action", he was convicted of "shamefully casting away his rifle" in the face of the enemy, and sentenced to death. The General commanding the 106th (Infantry) Brigade, Brigadier-General H. O'Donnell, upheld the verdict and death sentence, in spite of his doubts about the quality of the evidence presented. On 11 January 1917 the matter was placed before Field Marshal Sir Douglas Haig as the Commander-in-Chief of the British Expeditionary Force, along with the files of 10 other men from the 35th Division whom had been tried and sentenced to death for desertion in the presence of the enemy in the same incident. Haig confirmed three of the death sentences (including Stones'), and effectively pardoned the remaining eight men.

Stones was executed at Roellecourt in France by a firing squad on 18 January 1917, alongside two Lance-Corporals, John McDonald and Peter Goggins, also of the 19th Battalion D.L.I., who had been similarly sentenced to death for abandoning their posts in the same affair. All three were transported to a field in a motor ambulance vehicle manacled and blindfolded, where upon arrival they were escorted from the vehicle and tied to three wooden posts fixed in the earth, and shot simultaneously by three separate firing squads of 12 men each from their regiment. The chaplain who prayed with them before their deaths remarked that he had never met three braver men. Stones' body was buried in the British military cemetery at Saint-Pol-sur-Ternoise.

== Post-war events ==
Like many men executed for desertion in World War 1 in the British Army, Stones became a source of shame for his family, and his name was rarely mentioned. His great-nephew, Tom Stones, only discovered that he existed accidentally while researching his family tree, but later became prominent in the campaign for a Royal Pardon for Stones and the other servicemen executed for desertion during the First World War.

In 1997, Wear Valley Council took the then unprecedented decision to add Stones' name to the war memorial in Crook, after the Minister of State for the Armed Forces, John Reid, announced a government review of the cases of the men executed in World War 1 for desertion. Stones was officially pardoned in 2006 along with the 305 other British soldiers who had been similarly executed in the First World War.

== See also ==
- Harry Farr
- Shot at Dawn Memorial
