= List of memorials at the National Memorial Arboretum =

This is not a complete list of memorials at the National Remembrance Gardens at Alrewas, near Lichfield, Staffordshire.

A full list of the 400+ memorials that are located on the grounds of the National Remembrance Gardens can be found on their webiste.

== List ==
=== 0-9 ===
- 2 Squadron RAF Memorial; No II (AC) Squadron RAF, Shiny Two
- 4th Royal Tank Regiment 1916 - 1993 Memorial Altar
- 8th Army Memorial
- 8 Group Path Finder Force
- 9 Squadron RAF
- 10th Royal Hussars Memorial
- 11th (Prince Albert's Own) Hussars (The Cherry Pickers) Memorial
- 9th/12th Royal Lancers Memorial
- 17th Dogra Regiment Memorial
- 30 Squadron Association Memorial
- 31 Squadron RAF Memorial
- 36th Ulster Division
- 41 Club Memorial
- 45 Commando, 'Baker' Troop
- 47 Squadron RAF Memorial
- 49 Squadron Memorial
- 90 Signals Unit Memorial; TCU
- 214 Squadron RAF Memorial
- 624 (Special Duties) Squadron RAF Memorial
- 1940 Dunkirk Veterans' Association Memorial

=== A-Z ===
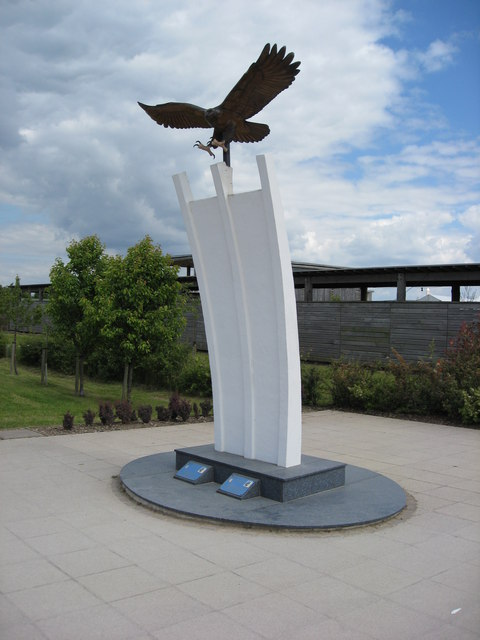

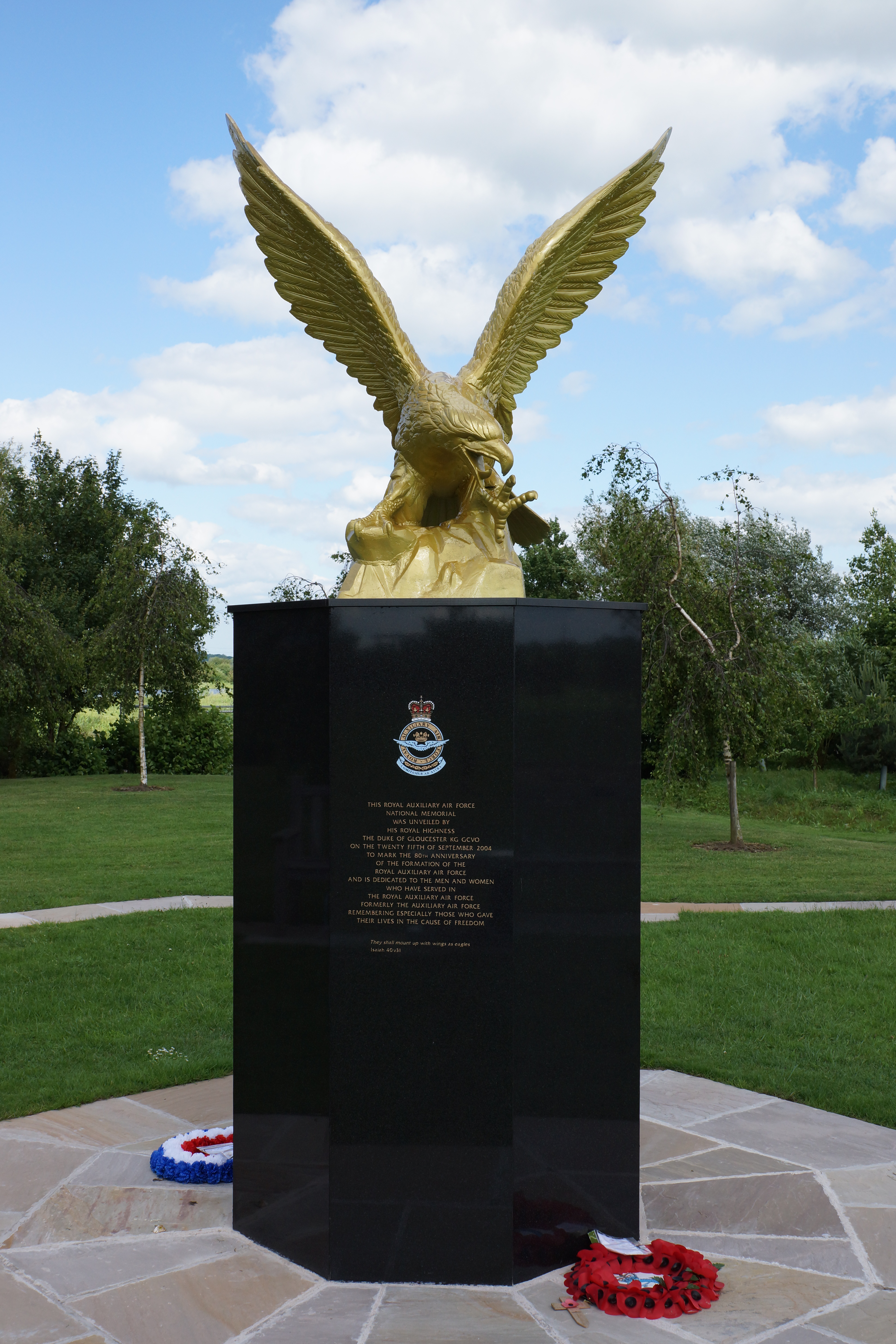

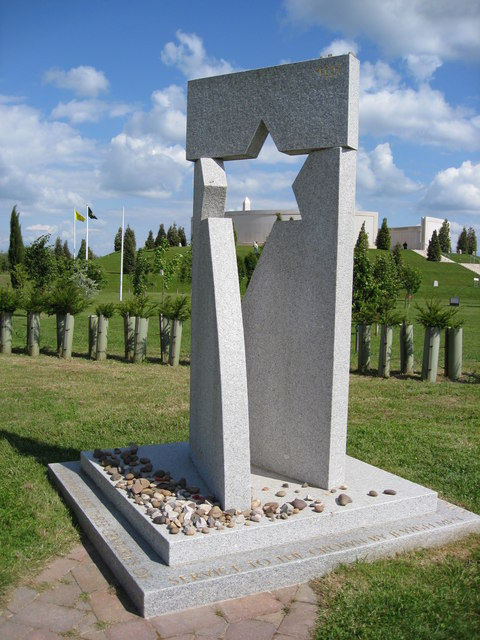

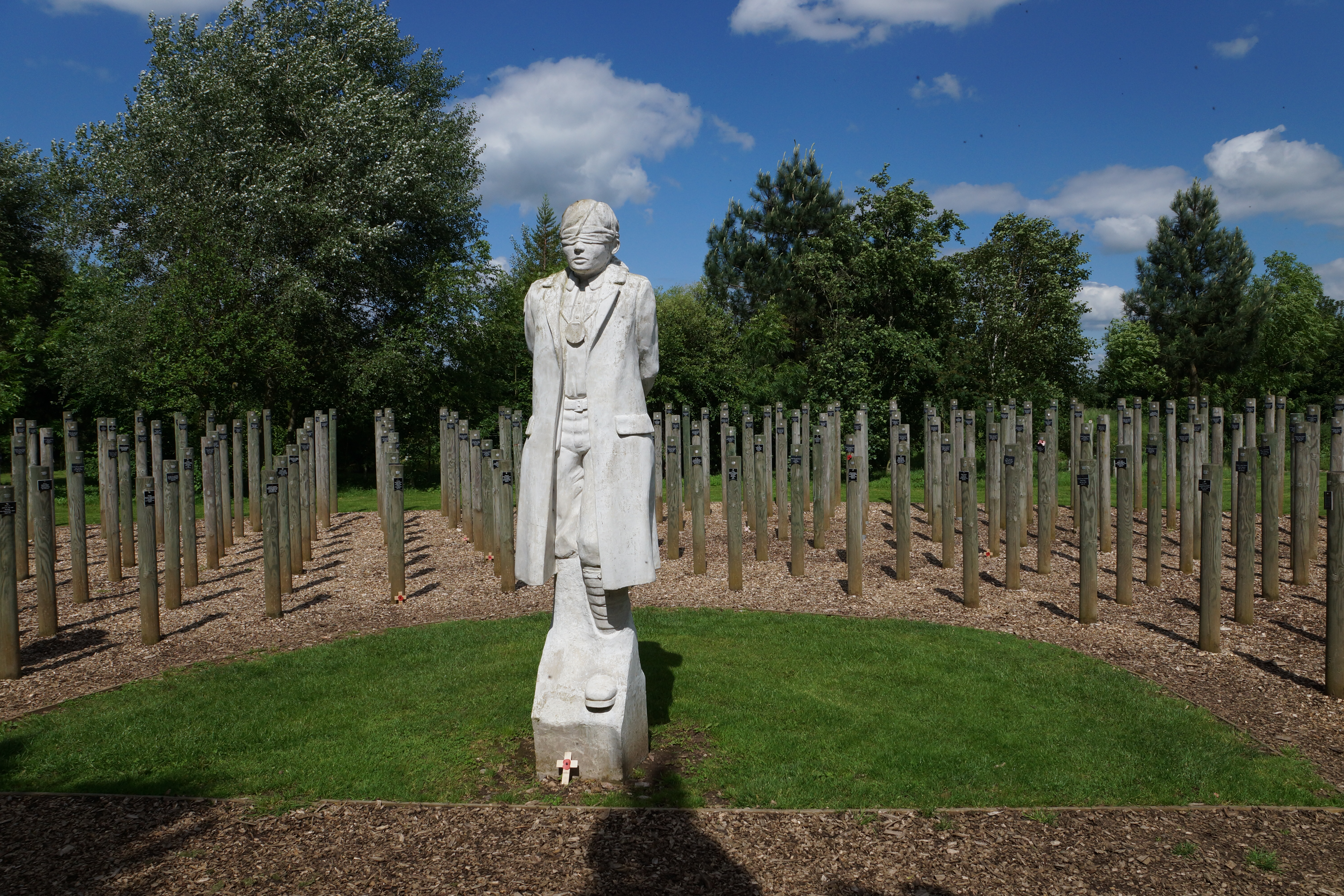

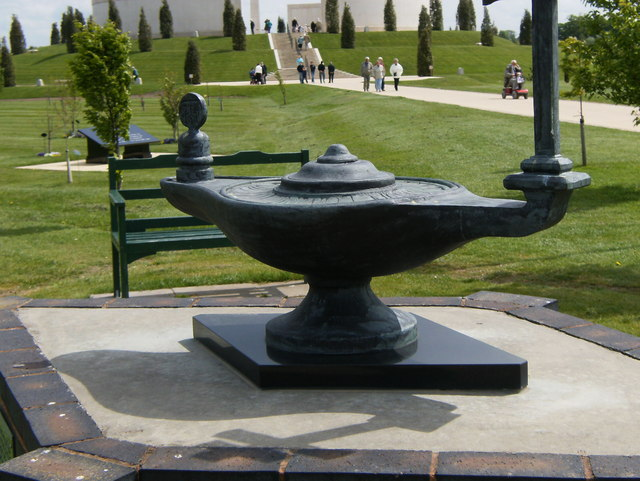

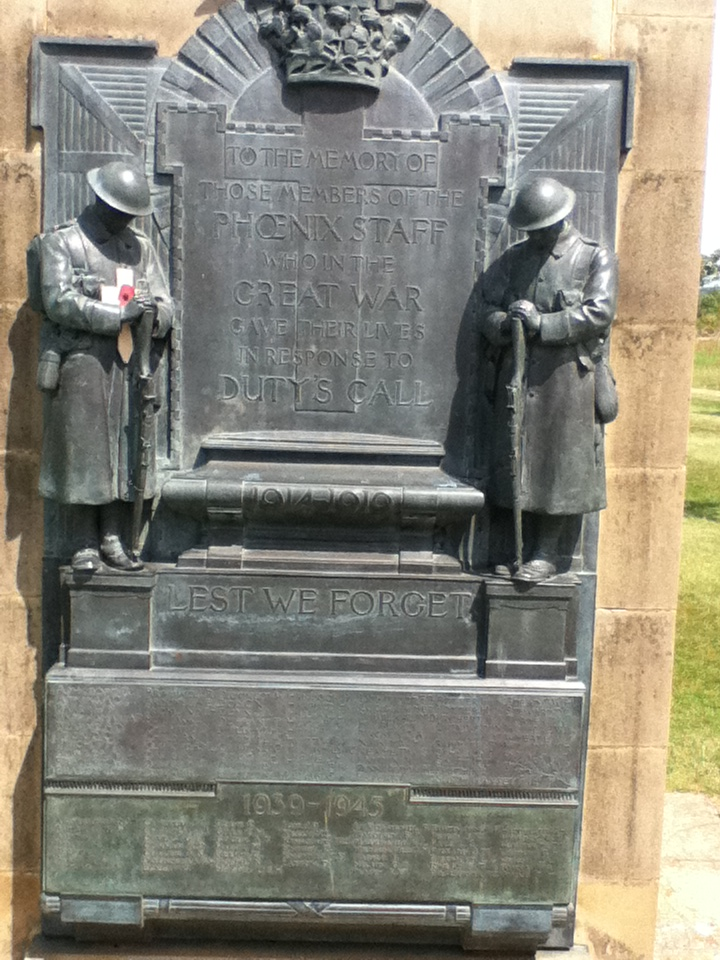

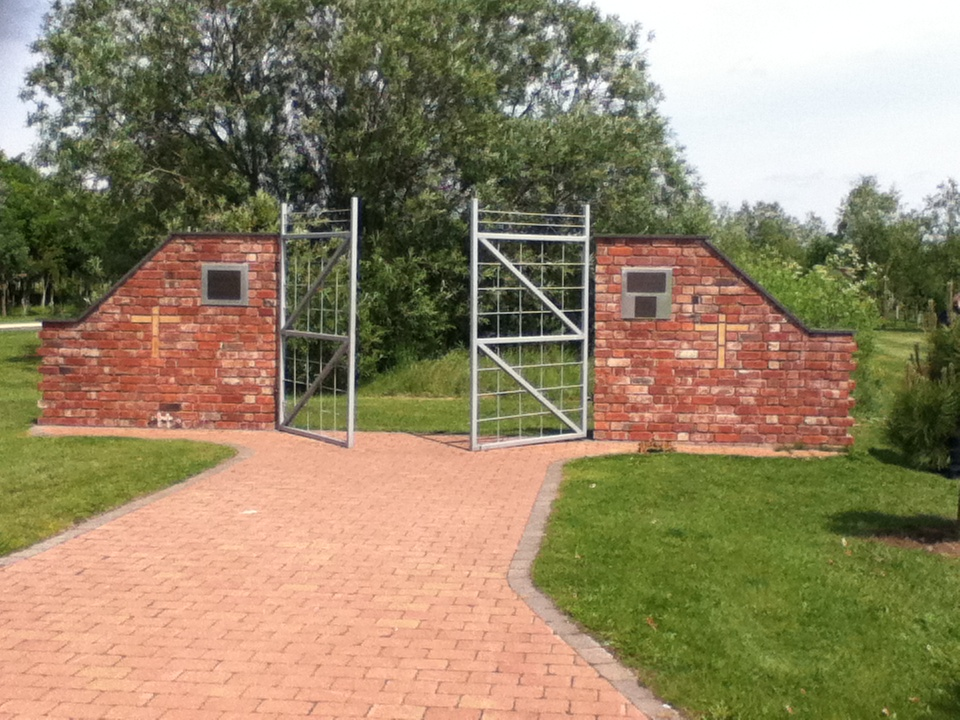

- Adjutant General's Corps Commemorative Garden
- Aguila Memorial (WRNS) (Wrens)
- Air Formation and Air Support Signals Memorial
- Aircrew Association Memorial
- Allied Special Forces Association Grove
- Allied Special Forces Association Sun Room
- Ambulance Services
- Ancient Burial Mound
- Anglo-Japanese Peace Garden
- Arctic Convoys Memorial: Russian Convoys
- Argyll and Sutherland Highlanders Memorial; Royal Scottish Regiment
- Armed Forces Memorial
- Armed Services Wood
- Army Air Corps Memorial
- Army Apprentice National Memorial
- Army Benevolent Fund - The Soldiers' Charity: ABF
- Army Commandos Memorial
- Army Dog Unit (Northern Ireland) Association Red Paw Memorial
- Army Parade
- Army Wood
- Association of Jewish Ex-Servicemen and Women Memorial
- Athel Shipping Line Memorial
- Auxiliary Territorial Service / Ack Ack Memorial
- Auxiliary Territorial Service Statue
- Baluch Regiment Memorial
- Basra Memorial Wall
- Bastion Memorial - The Bastion Memorial commemorates British casualties of the War in Afghanistan (2001–2021).
- Battle of Mirbat Memorial
- Battle of the River Plate Memorial
- Bevin Boys Memorial
- Bidadari Cemetery Memorial
- Birmingham Children's Hospital
- BLESMA - The Limbless Veteran's Orchard.
- Blind Veterans UK (St Dunstan's) Pathway
- Blown Away
- Blues and Royals
- Bomb Disposal Memorial: Explosive Ordnance Disposal
- Boys' Brigade
- Brigade of Gurkhas Memorial
- British Berlin Airlift Memorial
- British German Friendship Garden
- British Korean Veterans Association (BKVA)
- British Limbless Ex-Service Men's Association (BLESMA). The Limbless Veteran's Garden.
- British Nuclear Test Veterans Memorial (BNTV)
- British South Africa Police Memorial
- BRIXMIS Memorial
- Brotherhood of Greek Veterans Chapel (Greek Grove)
- Burma Railway
- Burma Star Memorial
- Cadet Forces' Memorial
- Captain Class Frigates Memorial
- Cardiac Risk in the Young, Dawn, Dusk
- Care of Police Survivors (also known as COPS)
- Castle Class Corvettes Memorial
- Catenian Association, The
- Cavalry Grove (Crescent)
- Celebration of Life Grove (Co-op)
- Changi Lych Gate
- Cheltenham College Memorial

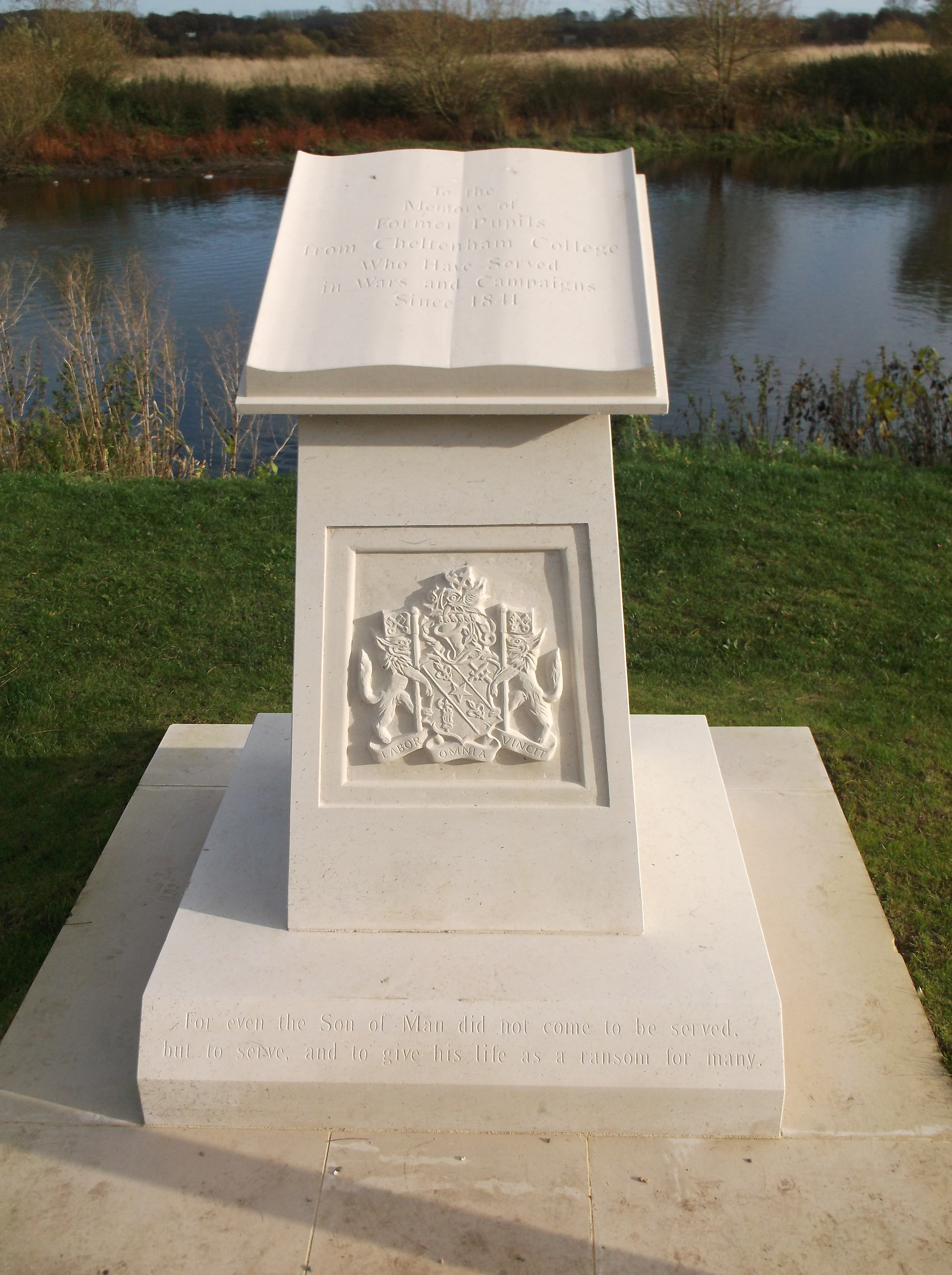
The Cheltenham College Memorial

- Cheshire Regiment Memorial Bench
- Children's Woodland
- Chindit Memorial
- Christmas Truce Memorial; Football Remembers
- Church Lads' and Church Girls' Brigade
- Civil Defence
- Civil Defence George Cross Awards
- Clan, Houston, Scottish Shire, Bullard and King Line Steamers Memorial
- Coastal Command Grove
- Cockleshell Heroes Memorial
- Combined Operations Memorial
- Cyprus Emergency (1955-1959) Memorial
- Defensively Equipped Merchant Ships (DEMS) Memorial
- Devonshire and Dorset Regiment
- Diamond Grove
- Dieppe Raid Memorial
- Douglas Skene Grove
- Duke of Lancaster's Regiment Memorial
- Duke of York's Military School
- Durham Light Infantry Memorial
- Edward's Trust Garden
- Escape Lines Memorial; Home Run
- Essex Regiment Memorial
- Ex-National Servicemen's Memorial
- Far East Air Force Memorial
- Far East Prisoners of War Grove (FEPOW Grove)
- Far East Prisoners of War Memorial Building (FEPOW)
- Fauld Explosion Memorial
- Fellowship of the Services Memorial
- Fire and Rescue Services Memorial
- Fleet Air Arm British Pacific and East Indies Fleets Aircrew Memorial
- Fleet Air Arm Memorial
- Foresters Friendly Society Memorial
- Free Spirit Horse Memorial
- Gallipoli Memorial
- Garden of the Innocents
- GCHQ Memorial
- General Post Office Memorial Garden (GPO)
- George Cross Island Association (Malta) Memorial
- Gibraltar Memorial
- Gift of Life Memorial: Donor Family Network
- Girls Venture Corps Memorial
- Glider Pilot Regiment Memorial
- Golden Grove
- Gordon Highlanders
- Green Howards
- Guinea Pig Club Memorial
- Gulf War 1990-1991 Memorial
- Heroes' Square
- Hiroshima Stone
- HM Ships Glorious, Acasta and Ardent Memorial
- HMS Antelope Garden
- HMS Ardent Memorial
- HMS Argonaut Memorial
- HMS Barham Memorial
- HMS Bruce Memorial
- HMS Bulwark, Albion and Centaur Memorial
- HMS Caledonia Memorial
- HMS Cavalier Memorial
- HMS Cossack Memorial
- HMS Dunedin Memorial
- HMS Formidable Memorial
- HMS Gambia Memorial
- HMS Ganges Memorial
- HMS Glory Memorial
- HMS Hood Memorial
- HMS Kenya Memorial
- HMS Neptune and Kandahar Memorial
- HMS Prince of Wales and HMS Repulse Memorial
- HMS Royal Arthur Memorial
- HMT Lancastria Memorial
- Home Front Memorial
- Home Service Force Memorial
- Hong Kong Volunteer Defence Corps Memorial
- Household Division Memorial
- Hunt Class Destroyers Memorial
- Inner Wheel Grove
- Institute of Quarrying Garden
- Intelligence Corps Memorial
- International Military Music Society
- Iraq / Afghanistan Willows
- Irish Infantry Grove
- Italy Star Association 1943 - 1945
- Japanese Hell Ships Memorial
- Kenya Police Memorial
- Kingfisher Wood
- King's African Rifles Memorial
- King's Royal Hussars Memorial
- King's Shropshire Light Infantry Memorial
- Ladysmith Memorial
- Leonard Cheshire Amphitheatre
- Lichfield and District Garden
- Lichfield Wood
- Life Guards Memorial
- Light Dragoons Memorial
- Light Infantry (The Rifles) Memorial
- Lions Club International Shelter
- Lisbon Maru Memorial - A memorial to the victims of the sinking of the Lisbon Maru ship was unveiled in 2021.
- Loch Class Frigates Memorial
- LST and Landing Craft Memorial
- Malaya and Borneo Veterans Memorial
- Malayan Volunteer Force Memorial
- Masonic Masons (Freemasons) Memorial
- Master Mariners Sundial
- Mediterranean Campaigns of World War 2
- Merchant Navy Association Memorial
- Merchant Navy Convoy Wood
- Mercian Volunteers Memorial
- Mercian Wood
- Military Medallists' Memorial
- Millennium Chapel of Peace and Forgiveness
- Millennium Wood
- Monte Cassino Association Memorial
- Moussey Memorial Seat
- National Association of Memorial Masons
- National Ex-Prisoner of War Association Memorial
- Naval Service Memorial
- Navy Wood
- Neutral Irish Registered Vessels Memorial
- Normandy Veterans Memorial
- Northern Ireland Prison Service Memorial
- Northern Rhodesia Police Memorial
- Not Forgotten Association Memorial
- Nursing Memorial, The
- Nyasaland Police Memorial
- Ocean Fairway Blue Funnel Line Memorial
- Ocean Fairway Elder Dempster Line Memorial
- Oddfellows
- Operation Market Garden: Market Garden Veterans' Association Memorial
- Orange Institution Memorial
- Palestine Police Old Comrades' Association Memorial
- Palestine Veterans' Association Memorial
- Parachute Regiment and Airborne Forces Memorial
- Parachute Squadron Royal Armoured Corps Memorial
- Pegasus Bridge Memorial
- Phantom Memorial
- Polar Bear Memorial: 49th West Riding Division
- Police Service Northern Ireland (PSNI) Memorial
- Polish Forces War Memorial
- Poppy Memorial; 'RBL Never Forget Tribute Garden'
- Popski's Private Army
- Posted - Service Children's Education Memorial
- Prince of Wales's Own Regiment of Yorkshire
- Princess Mary's RAF Nursing Service (PMRAFNS) Memorial
- Quaker Services Memorial
- Queen Alexandra's Royal Army Nursing Corps Memorial
- Queen Alexandra's Royal Navy Nursing Service and the Voluntary Aid Detachment Memorial
- Queen's Lancashire Regiment 1970-2006
- Queen's Own Buffs - The Royal Kent Regiment
- Queen's Own Highlanders Memorial
- Queen's Regiment Memorial
- Queen's Royal Hussars Memorial
- Queen's Royal Lancers Memorial
- RAC Future Forests
- RAF Administrative Apprentices Memorial
- RAF Air Loadmasters' Association Memorial
- RAF Barrage Balloons Memorial
- RAF Benevolent Fund Memorial
- RAF Flight and Air Engineers Memorial
- RAF Locking Memorial
- RAF Medical Services Memorial
- RAF Physical Training Instructors
- RAF Search and Rescue Memorial
- Rail Industry Memorial
- Reconciliation Stone
- Remembrance Glade
- Rhodesian African Rifles and Rhodesia Native Regiment Memorial
- Rhodesian Air Force Memorial
- Roadpeace Wood
- Rotary International Memorial
- Rotary Ridge
- Royal Air Force Boy Entrants Memorial
- Royal Air Force Cranwell Apprentices Memorial
- Royal Air Force Halton Apprentices Memorial Garden
- Royal Air Force Police Memorial
- Royal Air Force Regiment Memorial
- Royal Air Force Servicing Commando and Tactical Supply Wing Association Memorial
- Royal Air Force Wing
- Royal Air Force Wood
- Royal Air Forces Association Remembrance Garden (RAFA)
- Royal and Sun Alliance Memorials
- Royal Army Chaplains Memorial
- Royal Army Dental Corps (RADC) Memorial
- Royal Army Medical Corps (RAMC) Memorial
- Royal Army Physical Training Corps (RAPTC) Memorial
- Royal Army Veterinary Corps (RAVC) Memorial
- Royal Artillery Garden
- Royal Australian Air Force Memorial
- Royal Auxiliary Air Force Memorial
- Royal British Legion Poppy Field
- Royal Canadian Air Force Memorial
- Royal Corps of Signals Memorial
- Royal Dragoon Guards Memorial
- Royal Electrical and Mechanical Engineers (REME) Memorial
- Royal Engineers (RE) Memorial
- Royal Fleet Auxiliary Memorial
- Royal Fleet Auxiliary Ship 'Sir Percivale' Anchor
- Royal Gloucestershire, Berkshire and Wiltshire Regiment Memorial
- Royal Green Jackets Memorial
- Royal Hampshire Regiment Memorial
- Royal Hong Kong Police Memorial
- Royal Indian Navy and Indian Army Memorial
- Royal Leicestershire Regiment Memorial; Leicestershire Tigers
- Royal Logistic Corps Memorial
- Royal Mail Association Memorial
- Royal Malaysia Police Memorial
- Royal Marines Association Memorial
- Royal Military Police Association Memorial
- Royal National Lifeboat Institution (RNLI)
- Royal Naval Association Uttoxeter Memorial
- Royal Naval Medical Services Memorial
- Royal Naval Patrol Service Memorial; 'HMS Europa, (RNPS)'
- Royal Naval Review
- Royal Navy Coastal Forces Memorial
- Royal Navy Engineers Benevolent Society Memorial
- Royal Norfolk Regiment, Suffolk Regiment and Cambridgeshire Regiment Memorial; Anglian Regiment
- Royal Norwegian Navy
- Royal Observer Corps
- Royal Regiment of Fusiliers (Original) Memorial
- Royal Regiment of Fusiliers Memorial
- Royal Regiment of Scotland
- Royal Scots Dragoon Guards
- Royal Tank Regiment
- Royal Ulster Constabulary George Cross Way: RUC GC Way
- Royal Welsh Regiment Memorial
- Salvation Army Memorial
- Sapper Support
- Scouting Memorial
- Second Tactical Air Force Memorial
- Sensory Play Garden
- Shackleton Association Memorial
- Shaw, Saville and Albion Ltd Memorial
- Sherwood Rangers Yeomanry Memorial
- Shot at Dawn Memorial
- Showmen's Guild of Great Britain

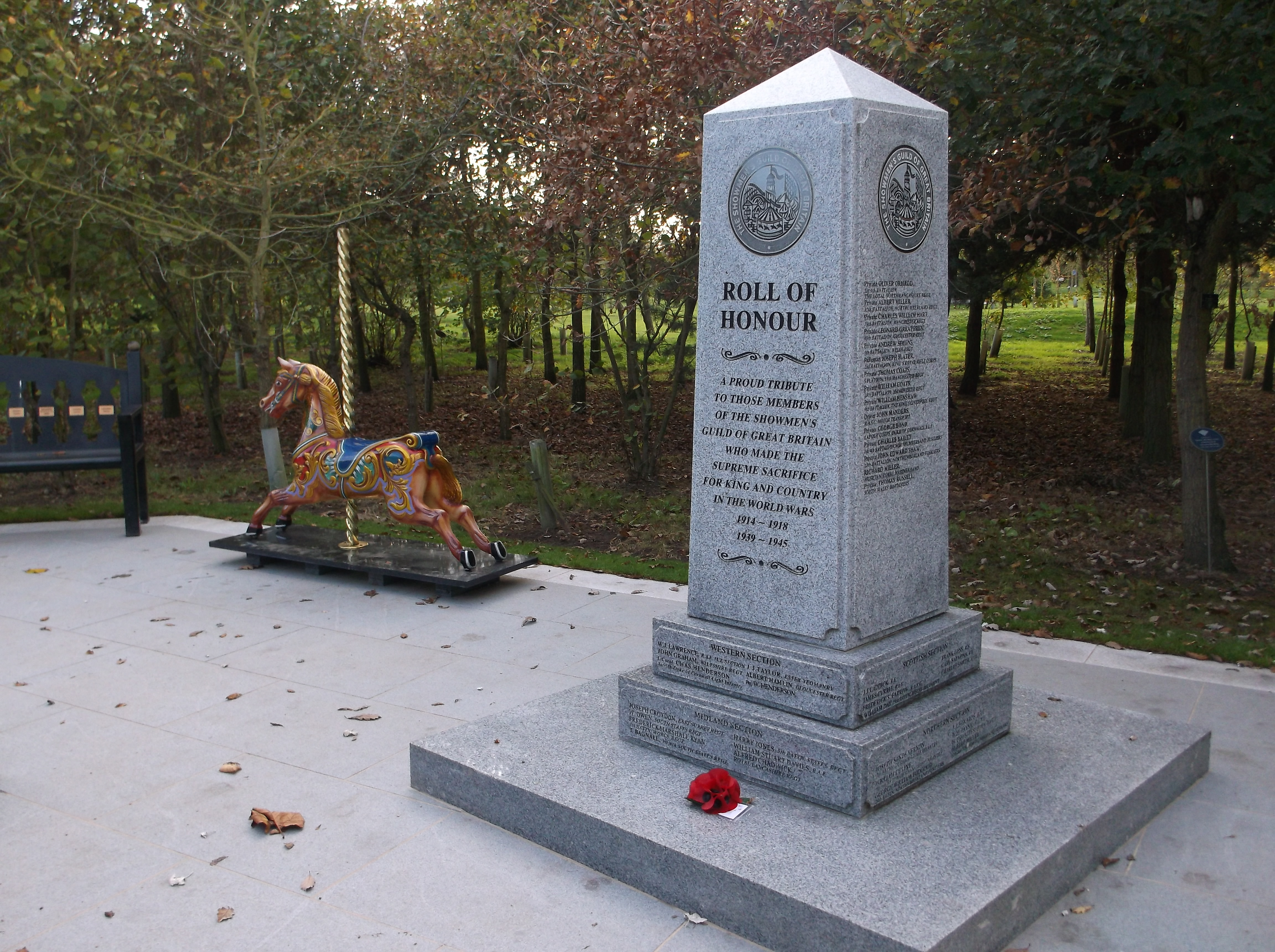
The Showmen's Guild of Great Britain memorial

- Shrievalty Avenue
- Shropshire Yeomanry Memorial Plinth
- Sikh Memorial
- Small Arms School Corps Memorial
- Soldiers, Sailors, Airmen and Families Association (SSAFA) Memorial
- Soroptimist International
- South Atlantic Medal Association memorial and the Antelope Garden; 'Falkland Islands Campaign Memorial'
- Special Constabulary Memorial
- Spiritualists' National Union Memorial
- St John Volunteers Memorial
- Staff Sergeant Phil Currass Memorial
- Staffordshire Regiment Memorial
- Staffordshire Yeomanry Memorial
- Stillbirth and Neonatal Death Charity Memorial (SANDS)
- Stirling X9-Y, 299 Squadron Memorial
- Submariners Association Memorial
- Suez Maru Memorial
- Suez Veterans Association
- Sultan of Oman's Armed Forces Memorial
- Sumatra Railway
- The Beat (Police Memorial Avenue)
- The Fisgard Association Memorial
- The London Scottish Regiment Memorial
- The National Memorial To The Evacuation (The British Evacuees Association)
- The Royal Antediluvian Order of Buffaloes Memorial
- Tobruk Memorial
- TOC H Memorial
- Ton Class Minesweepers Memorial
- Townswomen's Guild
- Trefoil Guild Memorial
- TS Exmouth Memorial
- TS Indefatigable Memorial
- TS Mercury, HMS Worcester, Conway, SATS General Botha, Nautical College Pangbourne Memorial
- TS Vindicatrix Memorial
- Twin Towers Memorial
- Type 21 Frigates Memorial
- Ulster Ash Grove
- Ulster Ash Grove Memorial
- Ulster Defence Regiment CGC Memorial
- Ulster Defence Regiment Memorial
- Ulster Special Constabulary Memorial
- Union Castle Line Memorial
- United Nations Avenue; UN
- Vera Atkins - SOE Memorial
- Victims of Overseas Terrorism
- Victoria Cross Commemorative Paving Stones: WW1 VC Paviours
- War Widows' Memorial
- War Widows' Rose Garden
- War Widows' Wood
- Watersmeet
- Western Front Association Grove
- Western Front Association Memorial
- Women's Auxiliary Air Force (WAAF) Memorial
- Women's Auxiliary Service - The Chinthe Women Memorial
- Women's Institute Memorial Seat: WI Wall
- Women's Land Army and Timber Corps Memorial
- Women's Royal Army Corps Memorial (WRAC)
- Women's Royal Naval Service (WRNS) (Wrens)
- Women's Section Memorial, The Royal British Legion
- Wooden Minesweepers Memorial
- Y Group Memorial
- Yantze Incident Memorial
- Yeomanry Avenue
- YMCA Memorial
- Yorkshire Regiment Memorial
