= Peter Goggins =

British Army soldier

- Born: 1894; South Moor, Durham
- Died: 18 January 1917 (aged 23) near Arras, France
- Military career
- Allegiance: United Kingdom
- Branch: British Army
- Rank: Lance Corporal
- Unit: Durham Light Infantry
- Conflicts: First World War: Western Front

Lance Corporal Peter Goggins (1894 – 18 January 1917) was a British soldier who was executed for desertion during the First World War. His case later became a well publicised example of the injustices of British military discipline during the war, and he was pardoned in 2006.

== Biography ==
Born in South Moor, Durham, Goggins was a miner who joined the 19th Battalion, Durham Light Infantry as a volunteer, although his occupation exempted him from conscription. Prior to serving overseas he had been promoted to the rank of Sergeant but was subsequently demoted after going absent without leave.

On 26 November 1916, Goggins was commanding a position near Arras on the Western Front with L/Cpl John McDonald. Whilst sheltering from a bombardment two British soldiers, fleeing a German raid, ran past their position shouting "Run for your lives; the Huns are on top of you!" Goggins, McDonald and others retreated to a reserve trench some 200 yards (180 m) away. The two men who ran past were probably L/Cpl Hopkinson and Pte Harding. Despite being in charge Goggins subsequently admitted at his trial that he had failed to visit the front line sentries before withdrawing. Both men were subsequently charged with deserting their posts, they were convicted at court martial on 28 December and sentenced to death. Another NCO, L/Sgt Stones, was sentenced to death at a separate court martial several days later for casting away his rifle in the same incident. The sentences were supported by Brigadier-General Henry O'Donnell, who wrote that he had doubts about the quality of the evidence, but felt that the executions were necessary to set an example to other men in the battalion. All three men were executed on 18 January. The chaplain who prayed with them before their deaths remarked that he had never met three braver men.

Goggins' execution had a devastating effect on his family. His wife of six months disappeared soon afterwards, and his mother had a nervous breakdown. He was seldom mentioned by his family, who saw his conviction as a source of shame, and his niece, Marina Brewis, who had simply been told that he died in the war, only learned his true fate years later from a television documentary. On learning the truth she began a campaign for her uncle to be pardoned.

Goggins' case became a well-publicised example of the injustices of the First World War due to the efforts of Marina Brewis, the fact that he had apparently been following orders, and the fact that the triple execution was unique. In 2006, Goggins was finally pardoned along with the other 305 British and British Empire soldiers executed for cowardice during the First World War, under the terms of the Armed Forces Act 2006. His case had been one of those discussed in Parliament during the passage of the Act.

== See also ==
- Harry Farr
- Shot at Dawn Memorial
