= Joseph Stone =

Joseph Stone may refer to

- Joseph Stone, Baron Stone (1903–1986), officer in the British Army, doctor, and royal peer
- Joseph Champlin Stone (1829–1902), U.S. representative from Iowa
- Joseph Stone (set decorator) (1919–1994), American set decorator
- Joseph Stone (screenwriter), screenwriter, see Academy Award for Best Writing (Original Screenplay)

== See also ==
- Joseph Stones (1892–1917), British soldier executed for cowardice
- Joe Stone, Dutch DJ and record producer
