= Henry O'Donnell =

Henry O'Donnell may refer to:

- Enrique O'Donnell, Conde de La Bisbal or Henry Joseph O'Donnell, Spanish general of Irish descent
- Henry O'Donnell (British Army officer), British general
- Henry O'Donnell (rugby union), Australian rugby union player
