= Harry Farr =

British Army soldier (1891–1916)

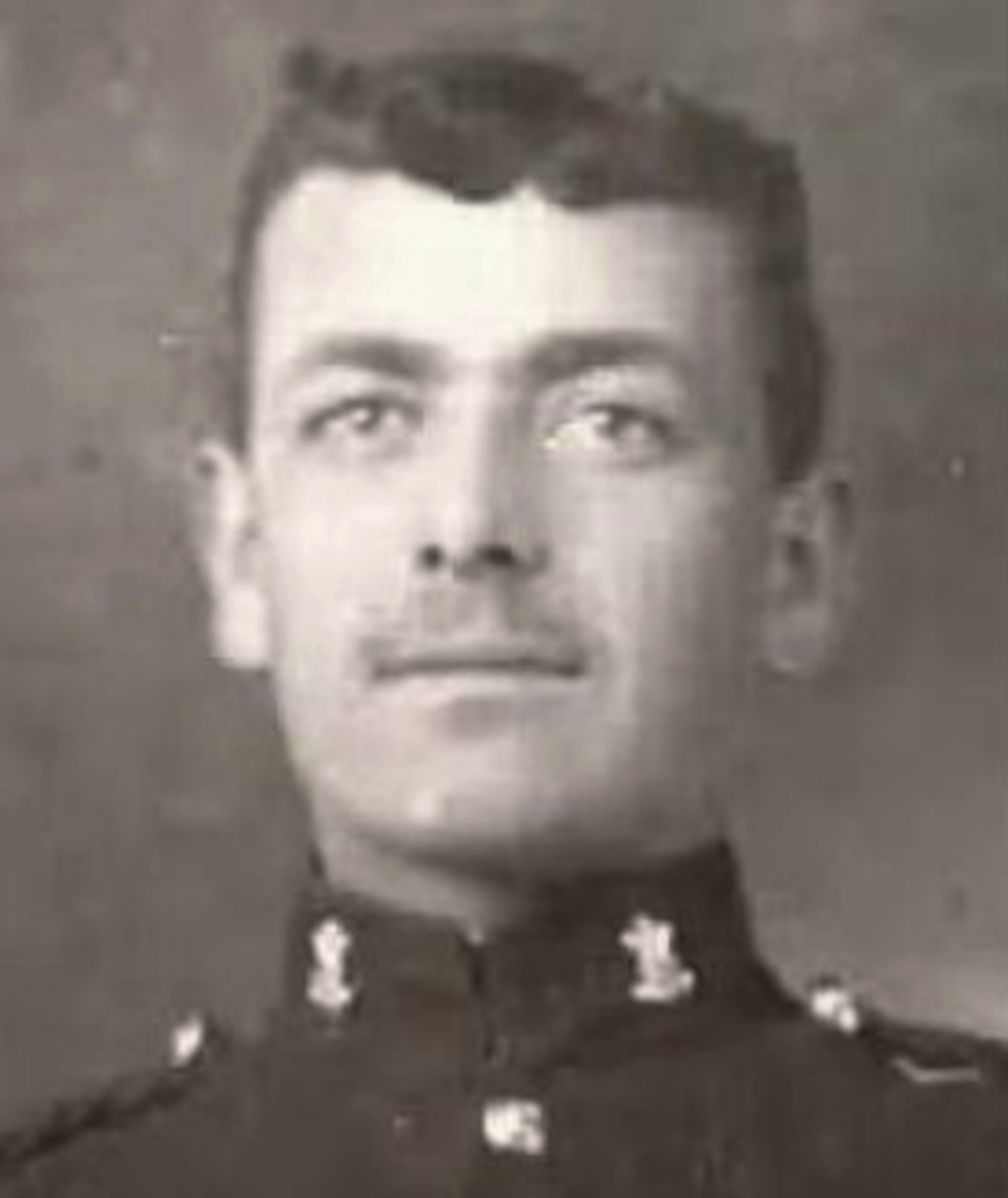
- Portrait of Farr, probably between 1914–16
- Born: 1891
- Died: 18 October 1916 (aged 25); Carnoy, France
- Burial place: Unknown
- Military career
- Allegiance: United Kingdom
- Branch: British Army
- Service years: 1908–1912, 1914–1916
- Rank: Private
- Service number: 8871
- Unit: West Yorkshire Regiment
- Conflicts: World War I; Western Front

Private Harry T. Farr (1891 – 18 October 1916) was a British soldier who was executed by firing squad during World War I for cowardice at the age of 25. Before the war, he lived in Kensington, London and joined the British Army in 1908. He served until 1912 and remained in the reserves until the outbreak of World War I. During the war, Farr served with the West Yorkshire Regiment on the Western Front. In 1915 and 1916 he was hospitalised multiple times for shell shock, the longest period being for five months. On 17 September 1916, Farr did not comply with an order to return to the front line, and was subsequently arrested and charged with cowardice. Unrepresented at his court martial, Farr was found guilty under section 4(7) of the Army Act 1881 and was sentenced to death. He was executed on 18 October 1916.

Farr's family initially suffered from shame and financial hardship following his execution. After discovering details regarding the circumstance of his death—particularly that he suffered from shell shock and did not have a fair trial—his family began a campaign in 1992 to have him posthumously pardoned. They brought a legal case against the Ministry of Defence, which led the government to grant posthumous pardons via the Armed Forces Act 2006, not only to Farr, but to 305 other men who were executed for cowardice, desertion and similar crimes in World War I.

== Early life ==
Harry T. Farr was born in 1891. He was not highly educated and lived in poverty. Before World War I, Farr lived in Kensington. He had joined the British Army on 8 May 1908, aged 17, and served until 1912. He remained in the reserves and worked as a scaffolder. Farr and his wife, Gertrude, had a daughter also named Gertrude or "Gertie", who was a young child when Farr left to fight in World War I.

== World War I ==
At the outbreak of World War I in August 1914, Farr was mobilized with the 2nd Battalion West Yorkshire Regiment. During his time serving in the war, Farr was hospitalised multiple times for shell shock and related symptoms. On 9 May 1915, shortly after Farr's battalion fought in the Battle of Aubers Ridge, he was removed from his position at Houplines and spent five months in hospital in Boulogne to recover from shell shock. His wife Gertrude recalled that while he was in hospital, it was evident he was suffering and nurses had to write letters on his behalf:

He shook all the time. He couldn't stand the noise of the guns. We got a letter from him, but it was in a stranger's handwriting. He could write perfectly well, but couldn't hold the pen because his hand was shaking.

Farr was discharged from hospital and sent back to the front; he was transferred to the 1st Battalion in October. Farr reported himself to the medical station several times over the following months. In April 1916, he suffered a "nervous collapse" and was treated at a dressing station for a fortnight. On 22 July he spent the night at a medical station for the same complaint and was discharged for duty the next day.

=== Desertion ===
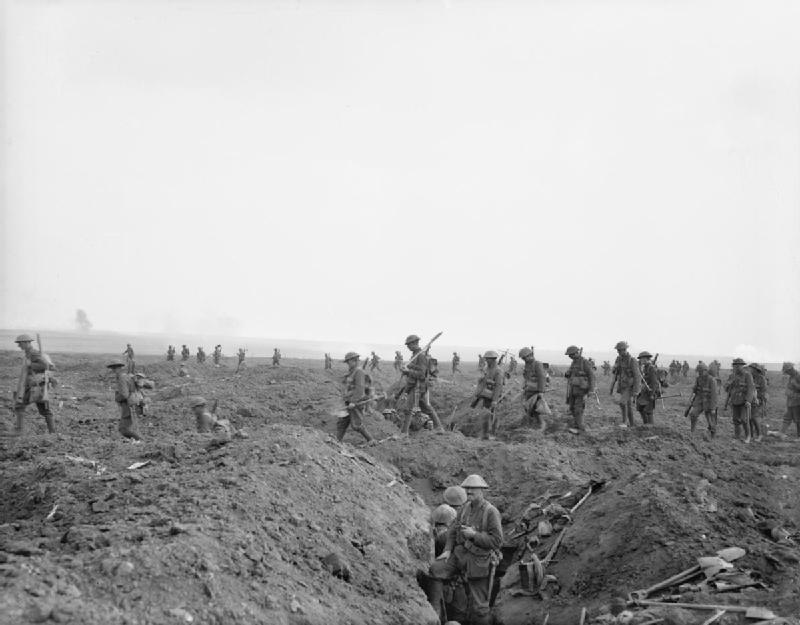
British reinforcements moving up to Flers-Courcelette on 15 September 1916, two days before Farr's battalion would travel there.

On 17 September 1916, Farr's battalion was due to move to the front line of the Battle of Flers–Courcelette as part of an assault on the German 'Quadrilateral'—a fortified area of German soldiers. To reach this position, the battalion travelled through the so-called 'Chimpanzee Valley' near an ongoing British artillery bombardment. On the morning of the 17th, Farr informed the regimental sergeant major, RSM Hanking, that he was unwell and unable to fight. Farr was instructed to seek the help of a medical officer, but Farr did not appear to be physically wounded and the medical officer did not record anything wrong with him. Farr was ordered to report for duty with a ration party transporting goods to the front line at around 8 P.M., but went missing shortly afterwards. That evening, Farr was still not at the front line. Hanking discovered Farr at 11 P.M. that evening at the transport lines with a brazier. He was ordered to join his battalion but said he "could not stand it". Hanking is recorded to have said in response "You are a fucking coward and you will go to the trenches. I give fuck all for my life and I give fuck all for yours and I'll get you fucking well shot". Hanking also threatened to shoot Farr if he did not follow orders, saying "I will blow your fucking brains out if you don't go". Hanking arranged an escort and a corporal to try and force Farr to return to the front. A physical confrontation between the men ensued and Farr escaped, running back to the transport line where he was later discovered.

=== Court martial ===
The following morning, 18 September 1916, Farr was arrested for disobeying orders and was charged with cowardice. Farr later testified that he could not recall any of the events which followed him struggling against the escort and corporal until after he was put under guard. He was taken to Ville-sur-Ancre on 25 September where his court martial was arranged a week later, on 2 October. He was formally accused of 'misbehaving before the enemy in such a manner as to show cowardice'. Farr underwent a medical examination, and was reported to have "satisfactory" physical and mental faculties. The court martial was presided over by Lieutenant-Colonel Frederick Spring, the Commanding Officer of the 11th (Service) Battalion of the Essex Regiment. Farr was unable to call a witness; the medical officer who had previously attended to him was injured and unavailable at the time of the trial. Farr also did not have a "prisoner's friend", (Note: In 10% of courts martial, the accused did not have a "prisoner's friend" to speak on their behalf. A "prisoner's friend" was someone, usually an officer, who was brought into courts martial to help defend the accused.) so he defended himself. The timeline and details of Farr's alleged offence was recounted by four soldiers, including Hanking, and Farr did not deny their account. (Note: The four witnesses who testified against Farr were Sergeant Major Hanking, Commanding Officer Quartermaster Sergeant J. W. Booth, Private D. Farrar, and Lance corporal W Form.) Acting Sergeant Andrews spoke in support of Farr, recounting his past medical complaints of nervousness. Farr was asked why he had not sought any further medical attention since he was arrested; Farr responded that he felt better when he was away from shellfire. Farr's military record prior to his offence was almost entirely faultless. His company commander wrote that, even though Farr did not perform well under fire, "his conduct and character are very good".

The court martial found Farr guilty of cowardice under section 4(7) of the Army Act 1881 and sentenced him to death. From August 1914 to October 1918, the death sentence did not always result in an execution: only 11% of death sentences during this time were actually carried out, and the proportion was even lower for those found guilty of cowardice (3.3%). At the time of Farr's guilty sentence, however, there was scepticism of the army's moral conduct and professionalism from figures like General Sir Douglas Haig; from 1916 onwards, Kitchener's Army brought an influx of volunteers into the army, and senior army officers were not certain how these men would fare on the front line. They believed that firm discipline was necessary to ensure the new volunteers would persist. Furthermore, the psychiatrist Simon Wessely writes that the four soldiers who testified against Farr at his trial had fought in the particularly brutal Battle of Flers–Courcelette on 17 September (the day on which Farr had deserted the front line), and were likely influenced by a sense of "honour"—feeling disappointed that a fellow soldier had let them down. The combination of military honour and the need for discipline may have led to Farr's ultimate death. As Farr's guilty sentence was passed up the chain of command for approval, his sentence did not change. Haig, as the Commander-in-Chief of the British Expeditionary Force subsequently confirmed the execution order. The transcript of the court martial, consisting largely of military terminology, runs to 1,353 words; of these, Farr spoke 445. The whole trial lasted 20 minutes.

=== Execution ===
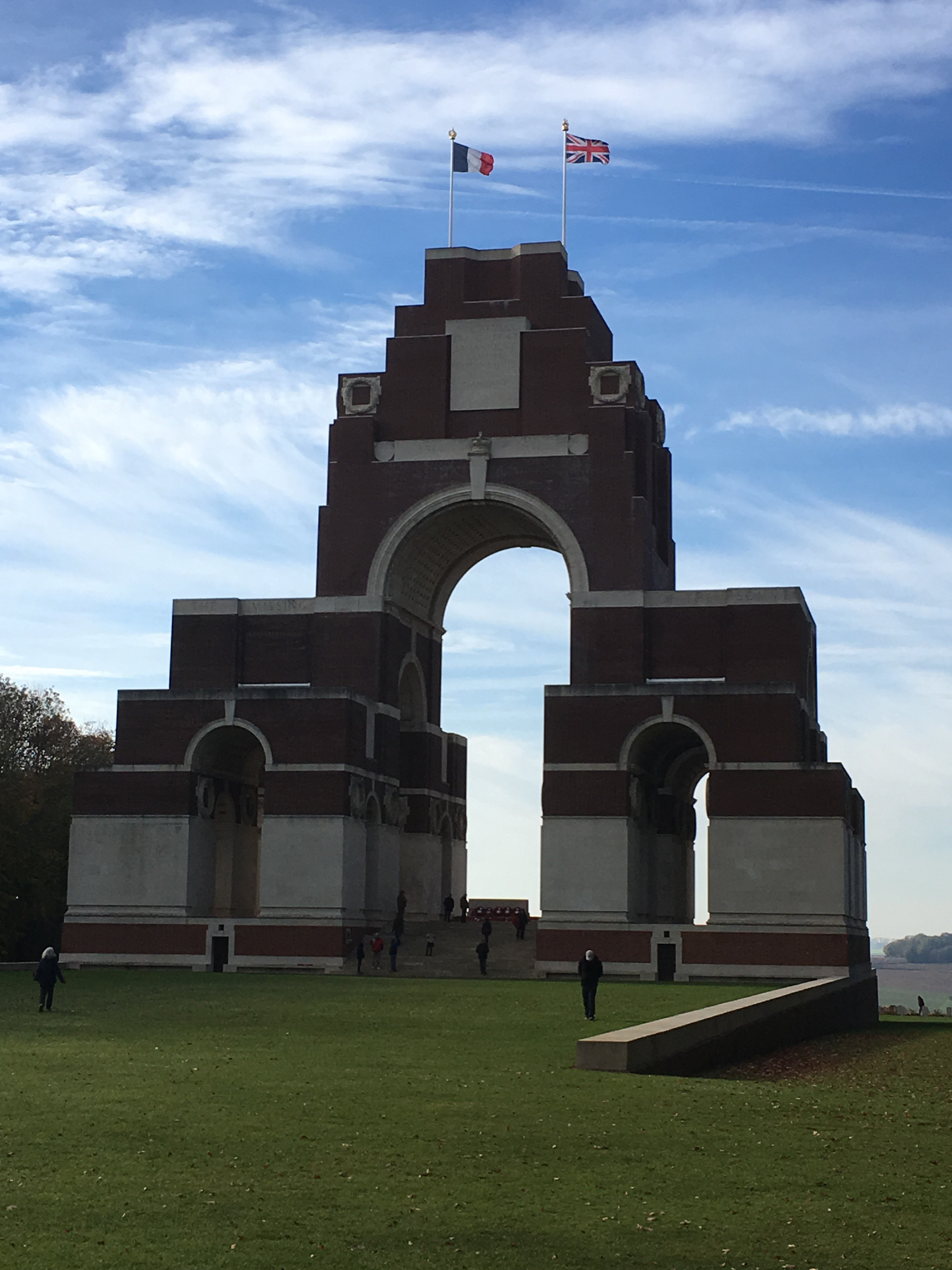
Harry Farr's name appears on the Mémorial de Thiepval, which commemorates men who died in the Battle of the Somme.

At 6.00 A.M on 18 October 1916, Farr was shot at Carnoy by a firing squad made up of 12 men from his own regiment. He is reported to have died immediately. Farr was offered a blindfold but did not wear it, as he wished to look the firing squad in the eye when he was shot. The army chaplain who also attended said that Farr had died with dignity. The chaplain later wrote to Farr's widow, saying "A finer soldier never lived". The location of Farr's grave is unknown, but his name is included on the Thiepval Memorial to the Missing.

== Legacy ==
=== Farr's family after his execution ===
The historian William Philpott describes Farr's death as "Britain's most notorious military execution". After Farr was executed, his widow Gertrude received a telegraph notifying her of his death. It read "Dear Madam, we regret to inform you that your husband has died. He was sentenced for cowardice and was shot at dawn on 18th October". Gertrude and her daughter Gertie could no longer receive a military pension (Note: The families of men who were executed during WWI could not continue to receive military pensions, whereas the families of men who died in service could.) and they were made homeless. They were able to find employment with the family of a lord in their hometown of Hampstead. Gertrude remarried; her second husband was killed during World War II. She suffered from shame at the reason for Farr's execution and she did not reveal the circumstance of his death for decades. She claimed she had hidden the telegraph informing her of his death due to the embarrassment. Farr's father was so ashamed that he refused to say his son's name for the rest of his life. When Gertrude did reveal the truth to Gertie, Gertie was in her 40s. They both continued to keep the circumstances of Farr's death a secret from others. It was only when Janet Booth—Farr's granddaughter—began researching her family tree that Gertrude told her the story of how he had died.

=== Posthumous pardon ===
==== Campaign and legal case ====
After learning about his execution, Booth and other members of Harry Farr's family began a campaign in 1992 to have him pardoned. They had discovered that some documents were being released by the government and, when they got hold of the court martial papers, they learned that Farr had been sent back to the front when he instead appeared to have needed urgent medical treatment. They, and the lawyers supporting Farr's case, believed that he had been suffering from shell shock or another related mental illness like post-traumatic stress disorder at the time of his trial. In 1993, the government refused a posthumous pardon for soldiers like Farr who had been shot for crimes including cowardice and desertion. However, in 2005 a High Court judge—Justice Stanley Burnton—said he believed that the family may have been incorrectly denied a pardon for Farr.

The family brought a legal case against the Ministry of Defence in May 2006. Gertie Harris, Farr's daughter, was invited to speak to Tom Watson, the Minister for Veteran's Affairs at the Ministry of Defence. He was so moved by the story of her father that he committed to finding a solution for the family.

In August 2006, Harris was notified by the Secretary of State for Defence, Des Browne, that the Armed Forces Bill currently going through parliamentary scrutiny would bring about pardons for WWI soldiers. At the time, Harris was 93. The Labour MP Andrew MacKinlay, who had been a campaigner for posthumous pardons, said that it was likely that the government recognised they were going to lose the Farr case, and therefore decided to pardon all soldiers who were executed for cowardice, desertion and related crimes. An official pardon for 306 WWI soldiers was announced by Browne on 16 August. Farr's legal status following his pardon was changed to reflect that he had been a "victim of war".

Farr's pardon, along with that of the 305 other men, was not universally welcomed. Haig's son Dawyck commented that some of the men were true criminals who "had to be made an example of".

==== Shell shock ====
Speaking after the announcement of Farr's pardon, Gertie Harris expressed relief in knowing that her father had been recognised as a victim of the war, rather than a coward. She maintained that he was likely to have been suffering from shell shock at the time of his arrest and execution, saying "From the time he went out until he was executed was two years. I don't think most people could stand a weekend of it - all that death around you. The noise got to him in the end. He was a victim of shell shock who was never given a fair trial".

The general understanding of shell shock at the time of World War I and Farr's death was that it was a weakness of the soldier and could spread between men; following Farr's trial, his commanding officer had written something to his effect, saying Farr was "likely to cause a panic". At his court martial, shell shock was not treated any differently from cowardice. Wessely writes that Farr was very likely experiencing "intense fear" on 17 September 1916, and was probably suffering from an illness like anxiety or post-traumatic stress disorder. (Note: Shell shock and PTSD are not the same diagnoses.) Additionally, neurological research since the beginning of the 21st century has suggested that explosions can lead to brain injury, suggesting that Farr might have been suffering from injury and was not fit to fight. Contemporary understandings of shell shock contributed to the posthumous pardons of WWI soldiers executed for crimes including cowardice and desertion, including Farr, although it is not possible to prove that all 306 men were suffering from the condition.

=== Art and popular culture ===
In June 2001, Farr's daughter Gertie Harris was invited to the opening of the Shot at Dawn Memorial at the National Memorial Arboretum in Staffordshire, which was built to commemorate the WWI soldiers executed by firing squad. From February to June 2014, the National Portrait Gallery in London held an exhibition of portraits of people from WWI. The curator, Paul Moorhouse, chose to include a portrait of Farr to resemble one of the many human experiences of the war, calling Farr "a courageous man". The book Shell Shock by Steve Stahl is in part inspired by the story of Harry Farr.

== See also ==
- Thomas Highgate – the first British soldier to be executed by firing squad in WWI
- Lucien Bersot – a French soldier executed by the French Army
