= Herbert Burden =

World War One deserter

- Born: Herbert Francis Burden; 22 March 1898; Lewisham, London, England
- Died: 21 July 1915 (aged 17); Ypres, Belgium
- Cause of death: Execution by firing squad
- Burial place: Unknown
- Military career
- Allegiance: British Expeditionary Force
- Service years: 1913/4–1915
- Rank: Private
- Service number: 3832 / 11012
- Units: East Surrey Regiment; Northumberland Fusiliers
- Conflicts: World War I: Western Front; Ypres Salient actions; Battle of Bellewaarde Ridge (executed)
- Awards: 1914-15 Star
- Memorials: National Memorial Arboretum

Herbert Francis Burden (22 March 1898 – 21 July 1915) was a soldier in the British Expeditionary Force during the First World War. Born in 1898 in Lewisham, south-east London, Burden is generally accepted as having lied about his age in order to enlist at the age of 16. Having joined the 1st Northumberland Fusiliers, he soon deserted, returned to London and joined the East Surrey Regiment, whom he also soon deserted. Rejoining his old battalion, he was sent to France when the army believed him to be 19 years old. Having already gone absent without leave (AWOL) from his unit on multiple occasions, he left his post once again the following month—he said to see a friend in the neighbouring regiment with whom he had served in 1913—but he was arrested and accused of desertion.

Normally, Burden's age would have spared him from execution (no juvenile offenders had been executed in Britain since 1889). However, since Burden had lied about his age in order to enlist, his superiors were under the impression that he was an adult. Found guilty, Burden was executed by firing squad two days later aged 17.

In 2001 his case, and his image, was the basis for a memorial statue in the National Memorial Arboretum to those who had been unfairly executed by 20th-century standards. Five years later, Burden and the other men were granted pardons by the British government.

== Early life ==
Herbert Burden was born on 22 March 1898, in Silvermere Road, Lewisham, the son of Arthur John Burden of Catford, a gardener, and Charlotte Mary, née Donaldson. Before the war Burden appears to have been employed as a carman, a form of delivery driver, possibly on the docks. (Note: A late 19th-century carman was described contemporaneously as the "driver of any cart, wagon, or other carriage in which coals shall be carried in sacks for delivery to the purchaser or purchaser; thereof, from any ship, lighter, barge, or other craft, or from any wharf [or] warehouse".)

=== Question of wartime identity ===
Precisely establishing Burden's identity has proved somewhat problematic for historians. Service records for a Herbert Francis Burden of the Northumberland Fusiliers have never been found. A large number of records of servicemen from the First World War were lost during the 1940 Blitz of the Second World War, and it may be that Burden's were lost in this way. However, this individual appears to have enlisted around May 1914, before hostilities had broken out. On the other hand, records of a soldier of another regiment—with exactly the same name—have been found, and it is likely that they are the same man who was executed in June 1915. Confusion has stemmed from the fact that the second Herbert Frances Burden joined up after the war began, on 23 November 1915, at Deptford recruiting office. He joined the East Surrey Regiment and was given service number 3832. But he had previously joined the 1st Northumberland Fusiliers, private number 11012; there he was registered as being 19 years and 240 days old and weighed 8 stone 3 pounds (52 kilograms).

Burden lied about his age when he enlisted, as he was 16 years old at the time; (Note: The War Office estimated, for the purpose of service pension provision, that 2,046 boys made a "misstatement" as to their age on recruitment; Richard van Emden has estimated the figure to be—in all capacities—closer to a quarter of a million. John Oakes, on the other hand, has estimated over 360,000; these figures have been disputed by scholars from the University of Kent at Canterbury, who have described them as "unconvincing". Hughes-Wilson and Corns have noted that "young men have always joined the army underage", and that the context of early-19th-century England was that by the age of 18 a boy—who had almost certainly left school at 14—"would regard himself as a man of the world" by 18. Also, although civil registration of births had been required since 1837, this was still not universally adhered to; many people did not possess a birth certificate, and could be "were quite unaware of their true age".) officially, the minimum age was 19. Then in March the following year—when his records would have shown him to have turned 19, he was transferred to the BEF. Attempting to clarify the confusion between the two possible Burdens, two recent scholars have suggested that the two men who joined both the East Surreys and the Northumberland Fusiliers were the same individual. They have suggested that he joined the Fusiliers in May 1914 ("aged 16 years and two months, but lied about his age, saying he was 18 years and two months old") and soon deserted. He returned to London and then enlisted with the East Surreys in November. He was three weeks into his career with this second regiment, based in Dover Castle barracks, when in December 1914 he deserted again. A Court of Inquiry was there on 11 January 1915 to investigate Burden's absence. It declared that

No 11012 Pte H Burden, 3rd East Surrey Regiment absented himself without leave from his Commanding Officer at Shaft Barracks, Dover on the 14th December 1914, that he is still illegally absent for a period exceeding 21 days and that on the 14th December 1914, he was deficient and still is so deficient of the following articles: Ammunition, Equipment, Instruments, Regimental Necessaries or Clothing of No 11012 Pte H Burden, 3rd East Surrey Regiment.

For some reason, Burden returned to his original regiment. No satisfactory explanation, it has been said, exists as to why Burden "joined the Northumberland Fusiliers, deserted, joined another battalion and deserted yet again".

== Military career ==
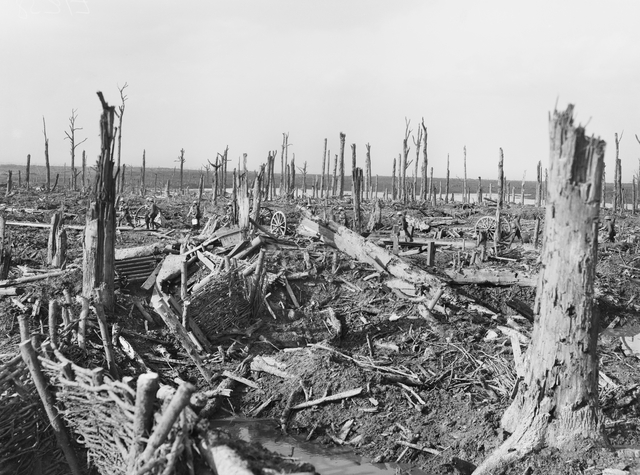
Bellewaarde Ridge a few months after the battle and Burden's execution.

It was with the Northumberland Fusiliers that he travelled to France. His battalion arrived in France in August 1914 although Burden did not join them until March 1915. His battalion fought at the bitterly contested Battle of Bellewaarde in June 1915, in which both the British and German armies had suffered high losses. It is uncertain whether Burden took part as he was recorded as being sick at the time. After he was sentenced his commanding officer reported that Burden had not been in action other than "the usual trench sniping" and a couple of patrols only. Apart from the Bellewaarde assault, which Burden was absent for, his battalion experienced a relatively quiet few months at the front. Only about 50% of the time was spent in the trenches, the remainder being spent resting, training and on working parties in the rear. During his time in the army, Burden breached the army's disciplinary code on multiple occasions, which included seven cases of absence in the UK, one case of absence on active service and three other miscellaneous offences. As he had served on the Western Front before the end of 1915 he was eligible to wear the 1914-15 Star, however, this was forfeited by his conviction for desertion, a detail noted as such in the Medal Roll of the Northumberland Fusiliers.

=== Desertion ===
Burden by now had "undergone the usual nerve-shattering baptism of shelling in the trenches", and having seen friends killed at the Battle of Belwaarde Ridge, was sent to a military hospital. Discharged on the afternoon of 26 June he was with his battalion when they received orders to head towards the front line, where it was detailed to dig trenches. Shortly after this order was received, Burden left his post. He was spotted with the neighbouring Royal West Kent Regiment the following day. Burden later explained that he had gone there to comfort a colleague whom he said he had served with in 1913. Burden said that he had "heard that he had lost a brother [and] I wanted to find out if it were true or not". This could very well have been the case, as the West Kent Regiment had recruited heavily from Burden's home area around Lewisham and Catford. (Note: Indeed, the first British soldier to have been executed in the First World War, Thomas Highgate, was from Catford. The road where he had lived, Brookdale Road, was close to Burden's own house in Dogget Road. Hughes-Wilson and Corns thus conclude that it is perfectly possible that they had known each other as civilians.) Burden was arrested on 28 June.

=== Court-martial and execution ===
[Burden] had an expanded chest measurement of 36 inches (91 centimetres). His complexion was given as "fresh" with dark brown hair and hazel eyes. The doctor described his physical development as "good". (Note: At his court-martial, however, Burden's commanding officer described him as having "an inferior physique". This could be either that he was still a youth, or because he was an "undernourished town-dweller".) He also appears to have had two tattoos, one on his right upper arm and another on his left forearm, of clasped hands and "Love Lilly" respectively.

Within two days of his capture, Burden was court martialled and found guilty of desertion. His sentence was confirmed by the commander of the British Second Army, General Sir Herbert Plumer. He was shot on 21 July 1915, at the age of 17. He was the youngest soldier to be executed by the British Army, although his age was never questioned during the proceedings, and Burden did not raise it himself. (Note: Hughes-Wilson and Corns note, though, that Burden was not the "youngest man knowingly executed by the British Army"; this was one Private William Hunter of the 1st Loyal North Lancashire Regiment. He was one of the only young men facing a capital charge who told the court-martial his true age. This was 18, two years younger than his registered age, "and yet this was not sufficient to reduce his sentence".) Discipline, though, "was still being applied to the standards of the pre-war regular army": every officer who had subsequently to voice an opinion, as part of the confirmatory process, on the merits or otherwise of Burden's death sentence opted to uphold it.

A number of factors have been subsequently raised in mitigation of Burden's circumstance: "his age, the alleged impact of the casualties suffered by his battalion at Bellewaarde Ridge, the fact that he had no defence at his trial as all who could speak for him were killed, and that his absence had been a classic case of AWOL, not desertion". Yet his unsatisfactory record in his few months of active service undoubtedly told against him; "unfortunately, Pte Burden had a bad record". This included at least seven cases of AWOL, in both England and France, and various other disciplinary offences. He also compounded his situation on at least one occasion by going sick the day after being meted out a punishment. In August 1915 the local Catford Journal newspaper reported him as being among nine local men who had recently been killed in action. Burden's name appeared on the roll of honour that was created after the war for St Lawrence's Church, Catford, although he does not appear on the war memorial subsequently erected within the church. Burden is listed on Addenda Panel 60 of the Menin Gate Memorial in Ypres.

== Memorialised ==
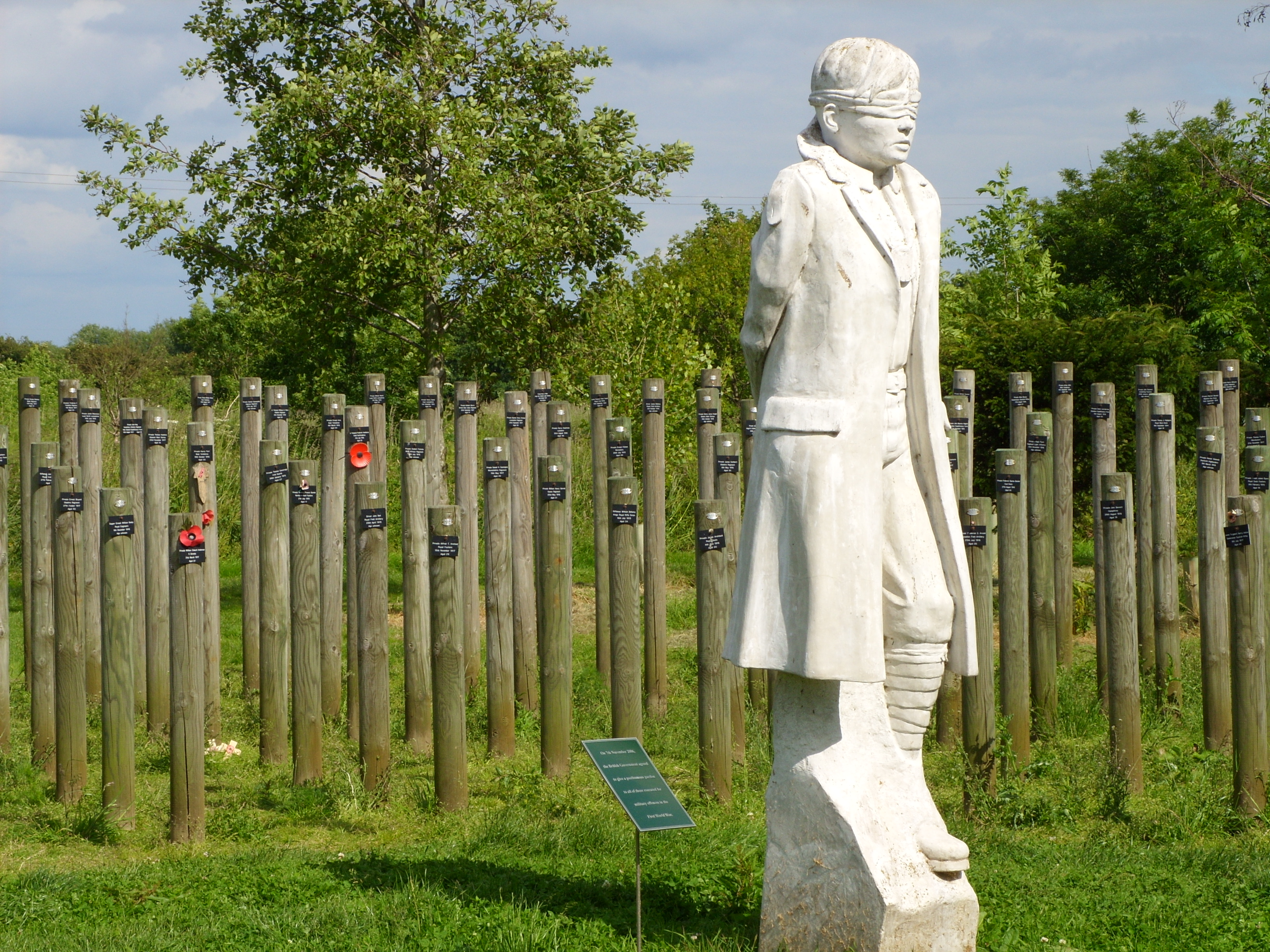
"Shot at Dawn" memorial by Andy de Comyn, based on Herbert Burden

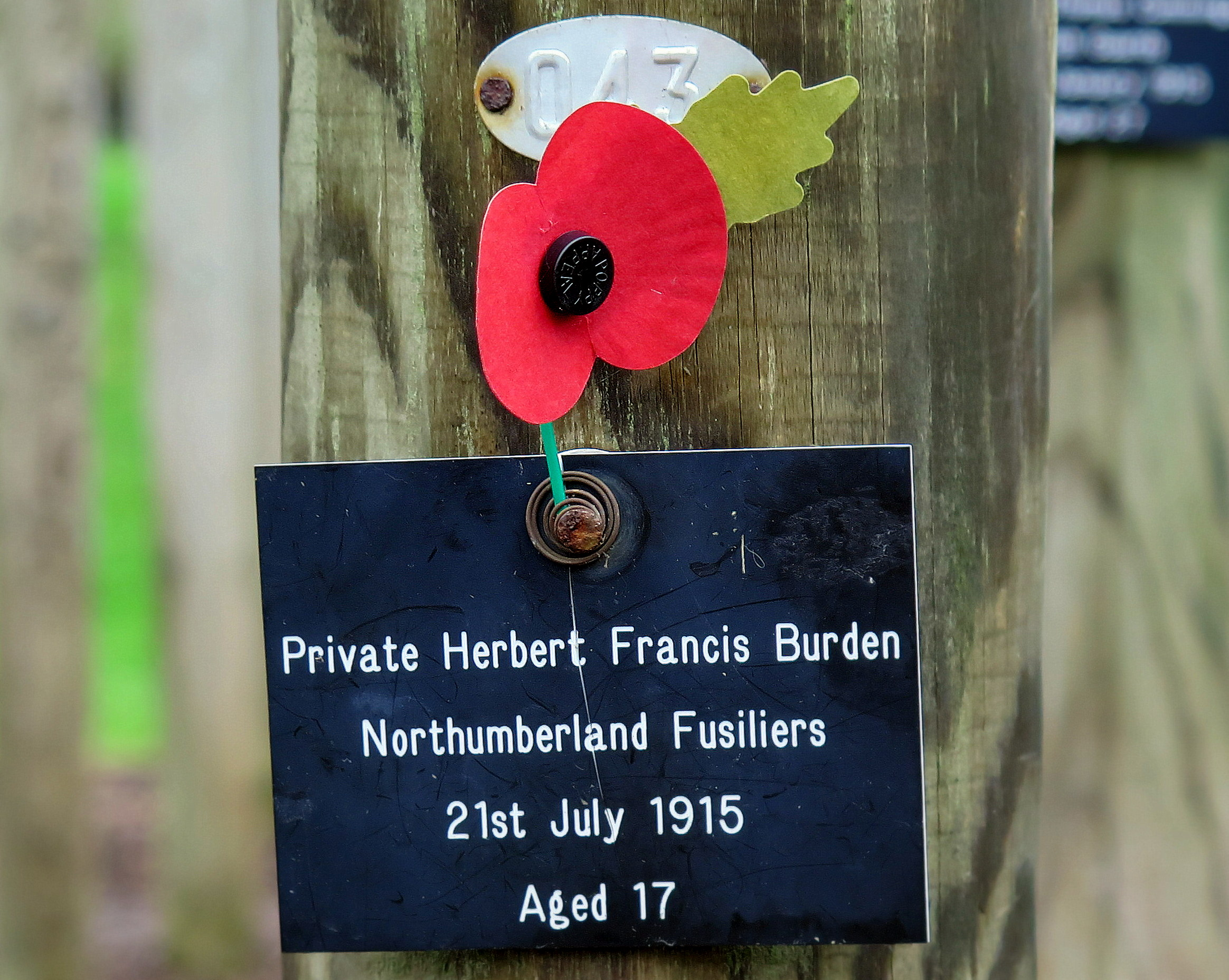
Private Burdens stake

The National Memorial Arboretum in Staffordshire houses a memorial to executed soldiers from the First World War. It consists of a ten-foot-high (3.0 m) statue, created by Andy de Comyn, surrounded by 306 short stakes to represent the number of executed men. The statue itself is based on Burden as he may have stood at the execution post: "bare-headed. blindfolded, a disc pinned over his heart and hands tied behind his back", and the stakes represent those that the condemned man was tied to before being shot. Six trees in front of the statue symbolise the assembled firing squad. The statue was erected at the Arboretum on the 85th anniversary of Burden's execution. It was designed to "represent all those British and Commonwealth soldiers executed for desertion in the First World War".

In 2006 the Secretary of State for Defence, Des Browne, announced that Herbert Burden would receive a parliamentary pardon from the British government, along with over 300 others who had also been executed for various offences—excluding murder—during the war. This was granted after a campaign to recognise that, the Director of the Arboretum said, "over 80 years of medical, psychological, psychiatric and sociological advances gives us advantages denied those who sat on the court-martial boards that passed sentence", and that they were almost certainly suffering from post-traumatic stress disorder, "or shell shock as it was known in 1916". On the other hand, for instance, military historian Correlli Barnett has described posthumous pardons such as these as being "pointless", as the moral compass of late-twentieth-century commentators was fundamentally different from that of officers at the front at the time who had "a different moral perspective". Such opposing views have been described as "part and parcel of the nationwide debate on the workings of military law during the Great War and the legitimacy of the demands for a posthumous public exoneration of the condemned soldiers".

The poet Ian Duhig has memorialised Burden in a poem called The Stake.

== Bibliography ==
- Adolphus, J. L.; Ellis, T. F. (1874). Report of Cases Argued and Determined in the English Courts of Common Law. Court of Queen's Bench. Vol. XI. Philadelphia: T & J. W. Johnson & Co. OCLC 4360713.
- BBC News (21 June 2001). "Tribute to WWI 'cowards'". BBC. OCLC 33057671.
- BBC News (16 August 2006). "Shot at dawn, pardoned 90 years on". BBC. OCLC 33057671.
- Beckett, I.; Bowman, T.; Connelly, M. (2017). The British Army and the First World War. Armies of the Great War. Cambridge: Cambridge University Press. ISBN 978-1-10700-577-8.
- CWGC (2018). "Private Burden, Herbert Francis". Commonwealth Graves Commission.
- Dixon, J. (2003). Magnificent But Not War: The Battle for Ypres, 1915. Barnsley: Pen and Sword. ISBN 978-1-84415-002-1.
- Emden, Richard van (2012). Boy Soldiers of the Great War. London: Bloomsbury. ISBN 978-1-40882-472-6.
- Fenton, B. (16 August 2006). "Pardoned: the 306 soldiers shot at dawn for 'cowardice'". The Telegraph. OCLC 60250404.
- Geograph (2016). "SK1814 : Herbert Francis BURDEN". Geograph.
- Hughes-Wilson, J.; Corns, C. M. (29 October 2001). Blindfold and Alone. London: Orion. ISBN 978-1-47460-319-5.
- Johnson, J. (2015). Executed at Dawn: British Firing Squads on the Western Front 1914–1918. Stroud: History Press. ISBN 978-0-7509-6552-1.
- Kent, G. (2013). On the Run: Deserters Through the Ages. London: Biteback Publishing. ISBN 978-1-84954-637-9.
- McEntee-Taylor, C. (2014). The Battle of Bellewaarde, June 1915. Barnsley: Pen and Sword. ISBN 978-1-78340-052-2.
- Norton-Taylor, R. (15 August 2006). "Executed WW1 soldiers to be given pardons". The Guardian. OCLC 819004900.
- Oakes, J. (2009). Kitchener's Lost Boys: From the Playing Fields to the Killing Fields. Stroud: History Press. ISBN 978-0-75247-576-9.
- Saunders, N. J. (2004). Matters of Conflict: Material Culture, Memory and the First World War. Routledge. ISBN 978-0-41528-054-9.
- Sokolowska-Paryz, M. (2012). Reimagining the War Memorial, Reinterpreting the Great War: The Formats of British Commemorative Fiction. Newcastle-upon-Tyne: Cambridge Scholars Publishing. ISBN 978-1-44383-845-0.
