= Andy DeComyn =

British sculptor (born 1966)

- Andy DeComyn in his studio
- Born: May 15, 1966 (age 60); Worcestershire
- Occupation: Sculptor
- Notable work: Shot at Dawn Memorial

Andy DeComyn is a British artist and sculptor born Worcestershire, England in 1966. He is a practicing public artist whose most notable creation is the Shot at Dawn Memorial which is sited at the National Memorial Arboretum. Other notable works include the Piper's Memorial at Longueval, the ATS Memorial at the National Memorial Arboretum, the SIGINTers Memorial at GCHQ and the Rugeley Miners Memorial.
