= 106th Brigade (United Kingdom) =

Military unit

The 106th Brigade was a formation of the British Army during the First World War. It was raised as part of the new army also known as Kitchener's Army and assigned to the 35th Division. The brigade served on the Western Front.

== History ==
The infantry was originally composed of Bantams, that is soldiers who would otherwise be excluded from service due to their short stature. This became a regular infantry Brigade with the end of the Bantam experiment at the end of 1916, after it was noted that bantam replacements were not up to the physical standards of the original recruits.

The brigade was disbanded in April 1919 at Ripon, the brigade was not reformed in the Second World War.

== Order of Battle ==
The composition of the brigade was as follows:

- 17th (Service) Battalion, Royal Scots (Rosebery)
- 17th (Service) Battalion, West Yorkshire Regiment (2nd Leeds) (left November 1917)
- 19th (Service) Battalion, Durham Light Infantry (2nd County) (left February 1918)
- 18th (Service) Battalion, Highland Light Infantry (4th Glasgow) (disbanded February 1918)
- 4th (Extra Reserve) Battalion, North Staffordshire Regiment (joined November 1917, left, to 105th Brigade, February 1918)
- 12th (Service) Battalion, Highland Light Infantry (joined February 1918)
- 106th Machine Gun Company (joined April 1916, left for division MG battalion February 1918)
- 106th Trench Mortar Battery (joined April 1916)

== Commanders ==
- Brig-Gen H. O'Donnell to 13 May 1916
- Brig-Gen J. H. W. Pollard C.B., C.M.G. from 13 May 1916, to March 1919

== Bibliography ==
- Davson, H.M. (1926). The History of the 35th Division in the Great War. London: Sifton Praed. OCLC 6048597.
- Joslen, H. F. (2003) [1960]. Orders of Battle: Second World War, 1939–1945. Uckfield, East Sussex: Naval and Military Press. ISBN 978-1-84342-474-1.
