= Shot at Dawn Memorial =

War memorial

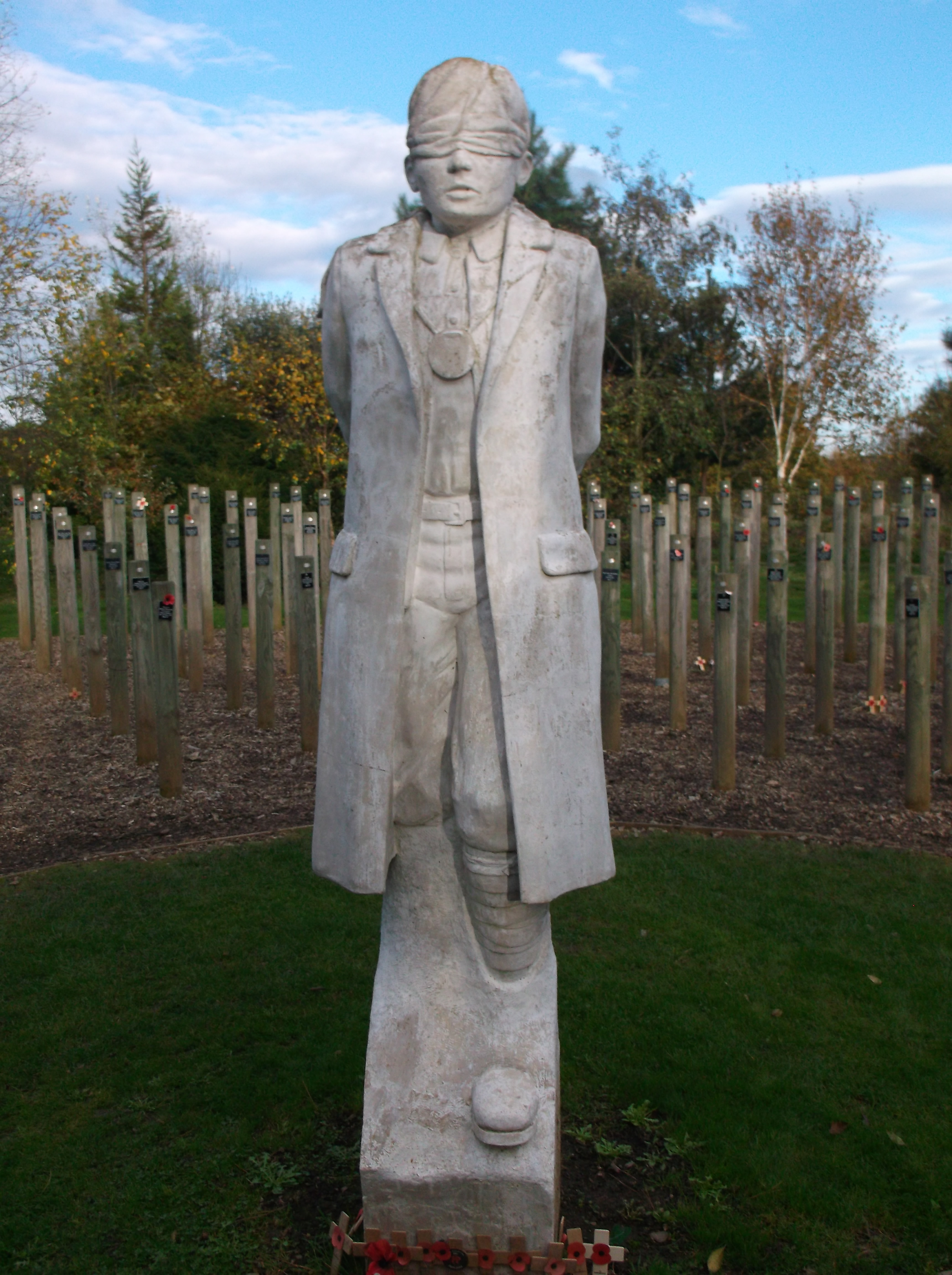
- The memorial in 2014
- Interactive map of Shot at Dawn Memorial
- Location: Royal British Legion National Remembrance Gardens, Staffordshire, England
- Coordinates: 52°43′29″N 1°43′28″W
- Designer: Andy DeComyn
- Type: Sculpture
- Material: Sculpted concrete statue, surrounded by 309 posts with name plaques
- Completion date: 2001
- Opening date: 21 June 2001
- Dedicated to: The servicemen executed by firing squad during World War I

The Shot at Dawn Memorial is a monument at the Royal British Legion National Remembrance Gardens near Alrewas, in Staffordshire, England. It commemorates the 309 British Army and Commonwealth soldiers executed after courts-martial for desertion and other capital offences during World War I.

== Background ==
The memorial is to servicemen executed by firing squad during the First World War. It has been argued that soldiers accused of cowardice were often not given fair trials; they were often not properly defended, and some were minors. Defendants often chose to speak in their own defence. The usual cause for their offences has been re-attributed in modern times to post-traumatic stress syndrome and combat stress reaction. Another perspective is that the decisions to execute were taken in the heat of war when the commander's job was to keep the army together and fighting.

Of the 200,000 or so men court-martialled during the First World War, 20,000 were found guilty of offences carrying the death penalty. Of those, 3080 actually received it, and of those sentences, 346 were carried out.

The others were given lesser sentences, or had death sentences commuted to a lesser punishment, e.g. hard labour, field punishment or a suspended sentence. 91 of the men executed were under a suspended sentence: 41 of those executed were previously subject to commuted death sentences, and one had a death sentence commuted twice before. Of the 346 men who were executed, 309 were pardoned: the remaining 37 were executed for murder, and would have been executed under civilian law.

The families of these victims often carried the stigma of the label of "coward". Another side to this form of justice is the lasting emotional pain caused to those who were in the firing squads, shooting those found guilty.

Britain was one of the last countries to withhold pardons for men executed during World War I: in 1993, John Major argued that pardoning the men would be an insult to those who died honourably on the battlefield and that everyone was tried fairly.

However, in August 2006 the then Defence Secretary, Des Browne, reversed this decision. He stated that he did not want "to second guess the decisions made by commanders in the field, who were doing their best to apply the rules and standards of the time", but that "it is better to acknowledge that injustices were clearly done in some cases, even if we cannot say which and to acknowledge that all these men were victims of war". In 2007, the Armed Forces Act 2006 was passed allowing the soldiers to be pardoned posthumously, although section 359(4) of the act states that the pardon "does not affect any conviction or sentence."

Originally the three men executed for mutiny during the war were also excluded from the memorial but were added in 2016.

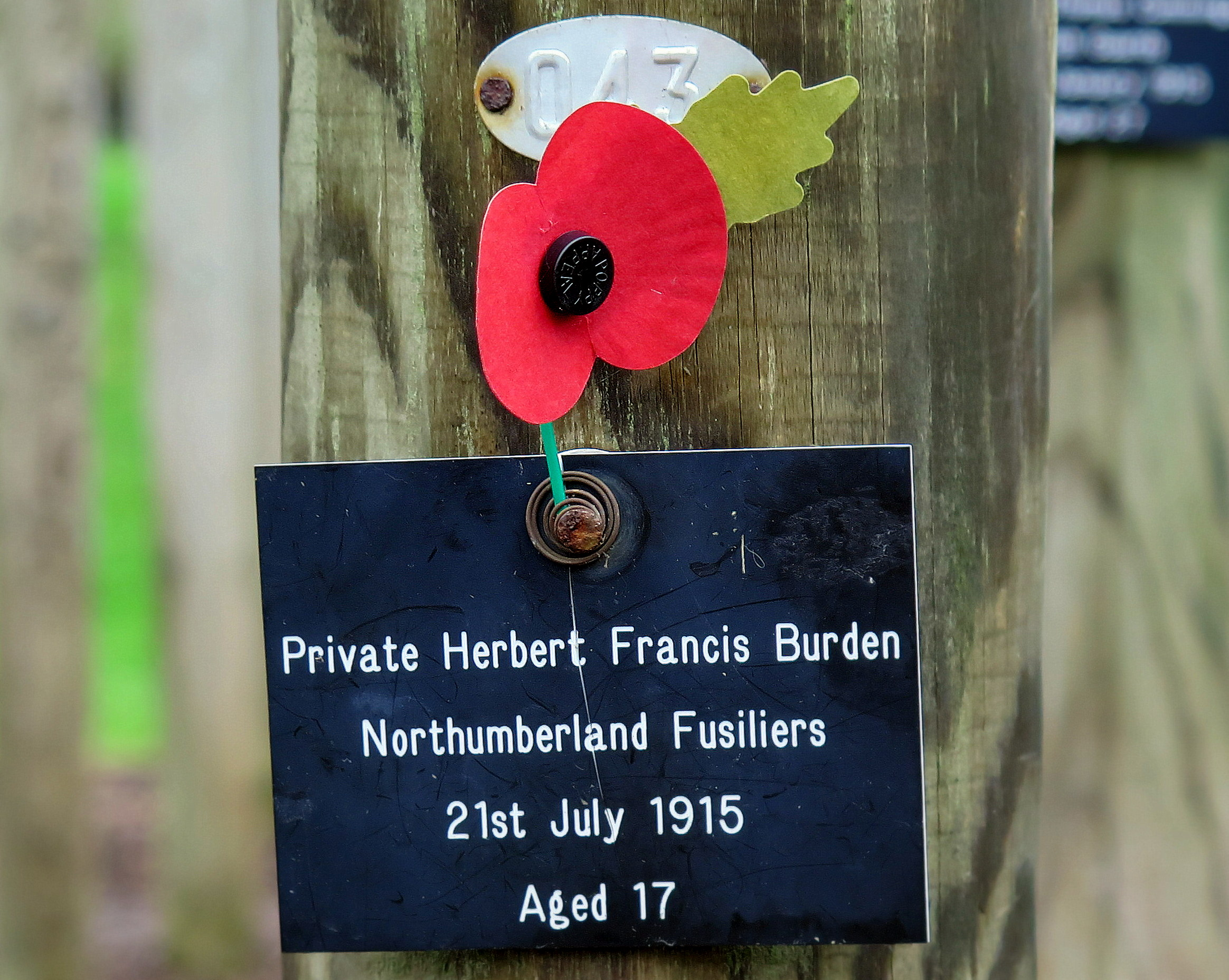
The stake of Private Herbert Burden

== Memorial ==
The memorial was created by the British public artist Andy DeComyn. It was created in 2000 as a gift from the artist to the relatives and was unveiled at the National Remembrance Gardens by Gertrude Harris, daughter of Private Harry Farr, in June 2001. Marina Brewis, the great-niece of Lance Corporal Peter Goggins, also attended the service.

The memorial portrays a young British soldier blindfolded and tied to a stake, ready to be shot by a firing squad. The memorial was inspired by 17-year-old Private Herbert Burden, who lied about his age to enlist in the armed forces and was later shot for desertion.

It is surrounded by a semicircle of stakes, on each of which are listed the names of the soldiers executed in this fashion. The stakes were originally wooden and required periodic renewal until replaced in 2024 with posts made from a recycled material during a renovation of the memorial.

== Tables ==
By nationality

Nationality	Number
United Kingdom	291
Canada	25
New Zealand	5
British West Indies	4
Australia	0
Civilians subject to military law (inc. Chinese labourers)	21

By theatre of war

Location	Number
France & Belgium	322
East Africa	5
Mesopotamia	4
Constantinople	4
Gallipoli	3
Salonika	3
Egypt	2
Italy	1
Palestine	1
Serbia	1

By charge

Charge	Number
Desertion	266
Murder	37
Cowardice	18
Quitting a post without authority	7
Striking or using violence to a superior officer	6
Disobedience to a lawful command	5
Mutiny	3
Sleeping at post	2
Casting away arms	2

== See also ==
- List of books on military executions in World War I
- Pardon for Soldiers of the Great War Act 2000

== Sources ==
- Corrigan, Gordon: Mud, Blood and Poppycock (2003) ISBN 0-304-35955-6
- Holmes, Richard: Tommy (2004) ISBN 0-00-713752-4
