= Polish Forces War Memorial =

War memorial in Staffordshire, England

Coordinates: 52.724540°N 1.726158°W

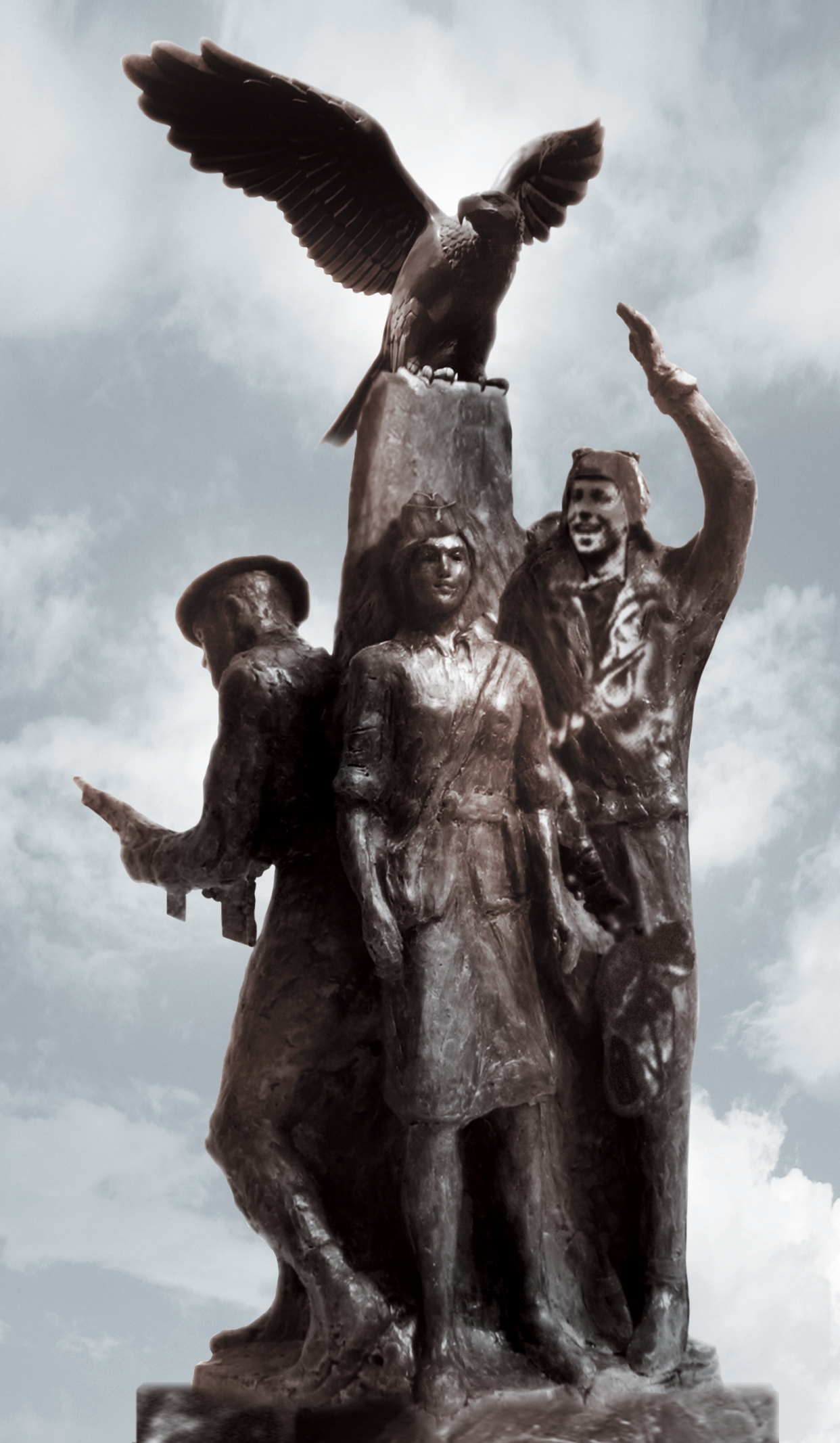
The Polish War Memorial Design Study

== Setting ==
The Royal British Legion National Remembrance Gardens near Lichfield, Staffordshire, England, comprises 150 acres of woodland and memorials dedicated to the fallen servicemen and women from World War I, World War II and other conflicts of the 20th Century.

== Rationale and other monuments ==
Until this monument, there was none in Britain to all Poles across Europe who died during World War II. Polish Forces served with the Allies from the first day of war until the last, fielding for instance the fourth-largest Allied army in the fight against Nazi German tyranny across Europe. Poles gave their lives on all fronts – on land, at sea and in the air – where they distinguished themselves with courage and self-sacrifice. Many were stationed in Britain. A prominent memorial in Cardiff commemorates all Polish soldiers, sailors and airmen who died in the war.

== Design and landscape ==
Four humble toy soldiers, each painted bronze and glued back-to-back atop a two-pence piece, created by Dr. Andrzej Meeson-Kielanowski, provided the inspiration behind the monument's design. It was decided that the statue design would be based on the concept and would comprise four sculptures of typical members of the main branches of the Polish Armed Forces: the Air Force, the Army, the Navy and the Polish Underground Home Army. The airman is a Polish pilot from RAF 303 Squadron during the Battle of Britain; the Underground figure is a woman courier wearing civilian clothes; the army is represented by a typical Polish soldier from the battle of Monte-Cassino; the seaman is a crew member of the Polish destroyer Błyskawica. In addition, the figures are ‘combined’ with an eagle uniting all four under its outspread wings.

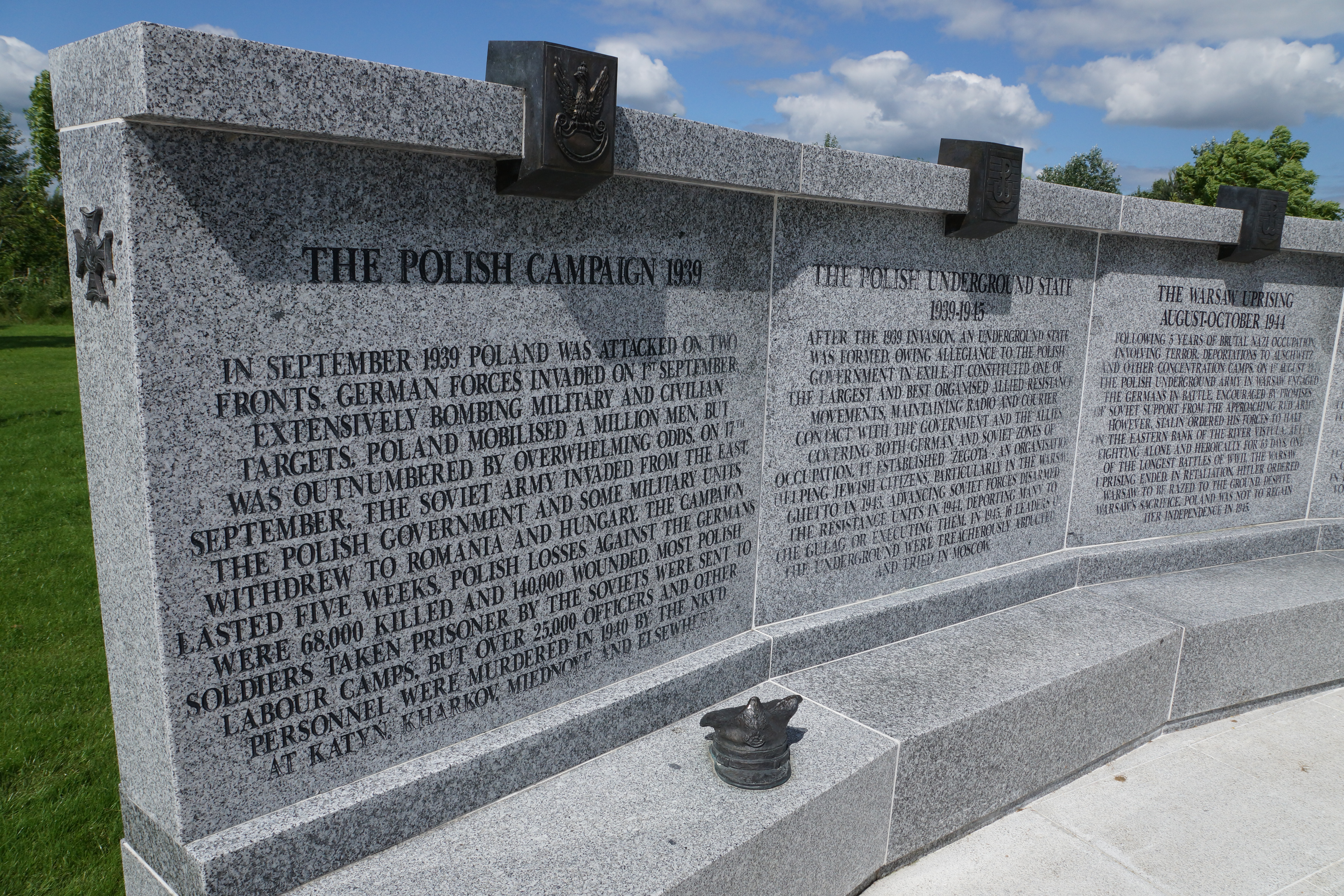
One of four surrounding plaques

The Polish Forces War Memorial statue is set within an imposing 18-metre diameter architectural feature and has a series of plaques inset into the monument surround describing the Polish contribution in the Second World War so therefore the monument acts as a tribute to the fallen and to enable visitors to learn an overview of the history of the allied Polish Forces during World War II.

The instigators of the Polish Forces Memorial project, Dr. Marek Stella-Sawicki – the project committee's chairman – and Dr. Meeson-Kielanowski, deputy chairman, were the driving force behind the Memorial with the aim to commission the design and construction of an imposing bronze monument of fitting artistic and architectural merit. Renowned Polish figurative sculptor Robert Sobociński was commissioned to create design mock-ups for the statues with the plan that the final bronze statue was to be cast in Poznań, Poland and imported, ready for installation in the early summer of 2009. The installation saw its unveiling ceremony in September 2009, to coincide with the 70th anniversary of the outbreak of World War II.

The Polish Forces Memorial project main sponsors and associated organisations:

- The Polish Ex-Combatants Association (Polish: Stowarzyszenie Polskich Kombatantów)
- The Association of Polish Knights of The Sovereign and Military Order of Malta (UK)
- The Polish Air Force Association Charitable Trust (Polish: Stowarzyszenie Lotników Polskich)
- The Polish Underground Movement (1939–1945) Study Trust (Polish: Studium Polski Podziemnej)
