= Lucien Bersot =

French soldier

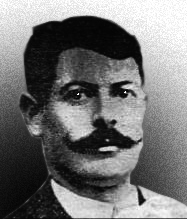
- Lucien Bersot (1881-1915)
- Born: Lucien Jean Baptiste Bersot; June 7, 1881; Authoison, France
- Died: February 13, 1915 (aged 33); Fontenoy, Aisne, France
- Military career
- Allegiance: France
- Service years: 1914 – 1915
- Rank: 2nd Class (Deuxième classe)
- Memorials: Rehabilitated on July 12, 1922

Lucien Jean Baptiste Bersot (June 7, 1881 – February 13, 1915) was a French soldier executed for refusing to wear trousers that had belonged to a dead person. His story was taken up by Alain Scoff and adapted for television by Yves Boisset.

== Private Bersot ==
Lucien Jean Baptiste Bersot was born on June 7, 1881, in Authoison (Haute-Saône) in a family of small farmers. His parents had come to settle in Besançon, Lucien learned the profession of farrier there and married there in 1908 before becoming the father of a girl in 1909.

When the First World War broke out, he was 33 years old. He was Mobilized into the 60th infantry regiment, which was on the Aisne front during the winter of 1914–1915, and had just suffered heavy losses near Soissons. However, the general staff judging this regiment not very active had just entrusted its command, on January 22, 1915, to Lieutenant-Colonel François Maurice Auroux, a former member of the African troops, responsible for whipping the unit into shape.

== The case ==
As there were no longer any trousers in his size in the store, Lucien Bersot could only wear the white canvas one supplied in his kit which was handed over during induction. Shivering from the cold in the trenches, he asked on February 11, 1915, the quartermaster, for red woollen trousers (le pantalon rouge) identical to those worn by his comrades. The sergeant then offered him tattered and bloodstained trousers, taken from a dead soldier, which Bersot refused.

For this refusal, Lucien Bersot was sentenced to eight days in prison by Lieutenant André. But Lieutenant-Colonel Auroux, commander of the regiment, considered this punishment insufficient and requested that he appear before a court-martial. As new recruits who had not yet been seasoned had just arrived, his intention was clearly to make an example of Bersot.

Before the regiment's “special” Council of War, chaired by Auroux, Bersot was condemned to death. The penalty imposed then did not correspond to the code of military justice because the offence had been observed in the rear and not in contact with the enemy.

Two companions of the condemned man (Elie Cottet-Dumoulin and Mohn André) then intervened with the lieutenant-colonel to try to soften the sentence, but were not heard and saw themselves punished in turn with forced labour in North Africa. Still, others refused to shoot their comrade during his execution which took place the next day on February 13, 1915, in Fontenoy, Aisne.

== Aftermath ==
After the war, a press campaign was undertaken by the newspaper Germinal under the pen of a young lawyer, René Rücklin, general councilor of Belfort. Supported by the League of Human Rights tried for the rehabilitation of Lucien Bersot. The Cour de Cassation could only rule quickly to confirm the injustice suffered by the shot Bersot. Thanks to this rehabilitation, his widow was able to claim the war widow's pension and his daughter was able to be recognized as a pupil of the Nation.

Colonel Auroux was implicated for having acted completely illegally, being both the accuser and the president of the court-martial, and causing the imposition of a sentence disproportionate to the fault (violation of article 24 of the Code of military justice) ascertained by the Court of Appeal of Besançon, the April 10, 1922. In the National Assembly, the deputy Louis Antériou, a veteran and future Minister of Pensions, challenged the government to ask for its condemnation, but André Maginot, Minister of War, rejected the discussion under the pretext of an anti-militarist campaign. Auroux, protected by Maginot and by the military hierarchy, escaped all judgment and retired in 1924 without being able to obtain the rank of general which would have been given to him if this incident was not investigated.

Lucien Bersot was re-interred in 1924 in the cemetery of Besançon. A stele located near the church of Fontenoy (Aisne), inaugurated in November 1994, pays homage to Lucien Bersot and to another shot for the example: the soldier Léonard Leymarie of the 305th infantry regiment, executed on December 12, 1914, under the pretext of giving himself a self-inflicted wound (according to the data of a medical report), an act for which he had always protested his innocence (he had been injured in the hand in his post as a lookout; however, many cases of voluntary mutilation consisted of holding a lit cigarette in the hollow of the hand-stretched over the parapet of the trench). Leymarie was rehabilitated in 1923.

The municipality of Besançon recently decided to put a plaque at the entrance to the Maison du peuple, 11, rue Battant. This plaque, inaugurated on November 11, 2009, honours the memory of Lucien Bersot and that of another soldier, Elie Cottet-Dumoulin, a tinsmith worker from Battant, condemned to ten years in prison for having protested against the sanction which struck his comrade in the regiment. This soldier died in the East (Serbia) in 1917.

A street in Besançon bears the name of Bersot, but it honours the memory of a namesake, benefactor of Besançon, François Louis Bersot.

This soldier, known all over the world thanks to Yves Boisset's film, was honoured in his native village. A plaque offered by the family paying homage to him and to all the "Shots for example" was attached to the war memorial, April 19, 2014. The Minister in charge of Veterans Affairs to the Minister of Defense had delegated Mr. Bonamy-Fromentin to represent him at this ceremony which brought together descendants from all French regions. Joseph Pinard, a biographer of the soldier, presented the exhibition lent by the city of Besançon to close this tribute.

== Stories and adaptations ==
- The tragic fate of Lucien Bersot was told in a book by Alain Scoff, Le Pantalon, published in 1982 by Jean-Claude Lattès and republished in 1998.
- In La Peur, a novel by Gabriel Chevalier, a telephone corporal reports to the narrator an intercepted conversation between a colonel and a general during the fall of 1914. The colonel tries to obtain the pardon of a soldier sentenced to death by the council of war for refusing bloodstained red trousers presented by the quartermaster. The soldier is finally shot. If Chevalier does not mention a name, this anecdote obviously refers to the story of Lucien Bersot.
- Le Pantalon, a television film by Yves Boisset, broadcast on France 2 in 1997 and bearing the same title as the book, was also inspired by his case.
- The plot of Patrick Pécherot’s Tranchecaille references Bersot's story.
- Lucien 5, a tribute song by the group La Poupee du Loup which won thanks to it, almost a hundred years later to the day, the final of the third national springboard “C'est ma chance! on France Bleu, with several partial and full broadcasts on the air between January and March 2015. The song was notably commented on by Eric Bastien and Laurent Petitguillaume in Le Mag Musiques 7. It was also performed "live" at the Maison de la Radio in Paris in the program" Elo Mélodie " on 8, 9 and May 10, 2015.

== Bibliography ==
Notes

References

- Chevallier, Gabriel (2010). La peur (in French). Librairie générale française. ISBN 9782253127819. - Total pages: 408
- Scoff, Alain (1982). Le pantalon (in French). J.C. Lattès. ISBN 9782748169195. - Total pages: 283
- Sumner, Ian (2012). They Shall Not Pass: The French Army on the Western Front, 1914-1918. Pen & Sword Military. ISBN 9781848842090. - Total pages: 248
