= Henry O'Donnell (British Army officer) =

British Army officer

Brigadier-General Henry O'Donnell CMG
- Born: 10 September 1852
- Died: 31 October 1928 (aged 76)
- Military career
- Branch: British Army
- Rank: Brigadier-General
- Unit: West Yorkshire Regiment
- Commands: 35th Division
- Conflicts: First World War
- Awards: Companion of the Order of St Michael and St George

Brigadier-General Henry O'Donnell CMG (10 September 1852 – 31 October 1928) was a British Army officer who commanded the 35th Division on an acting basis during the First World War.

== Military career ==
O'Donnell was commissioned as a lieutenant into the West Yorkshire Regiment on 10 May 1882.

He was promoted to captain in April 1890 and in June 1891 was made an adjutant.

As the Second Boer War was going on, he was promoted to major in April 1901 Although this was later antedated to June 1900.

In February 1908 he succeeded Herbert Watts as commanding officer of a battalion of the West Yorks, for which he was raised to the rank of lieutenant colonel.

After four years in command he was placed on half-pay in February 1912. He was also promoted to colonel, backdated to 4 October 1911. In August he reverted to normal pay when he took command of a brigade of the Territorial Force. He was moved to command a district in May 1914.

He saw action during the First World War, became an authority on military training and wrote significant papers entitled "Catechism on Field Training" and "Lectures to Recruits: The training of the soldier, a lecture to recruits, and Intercommunication and passing orders and messages". Promoted in June 1915 to temporary brigadier general, he became commander of the 106th Infantry Brigade on 13 May 1916 and briefly commanded the 35th Division on an acting basis from 17 September 1916 to 23 September 1916. He was appointed a Companion of the Order of St Michael and St George in the 1919 Birthday Honours.

== Sources ==
- Davson, H. M. (2003) [1926]. The History of the 35th Division in the Great War (Naval & Military Press ed.). London: Sifton Praed & Co. Ltd. ISBN 978-1-84342-643-1.
