= National Memorial Arboretum =

Site of remembrance, Staffordshire, England

Coordinates: 52.7282°N 1.7285°W

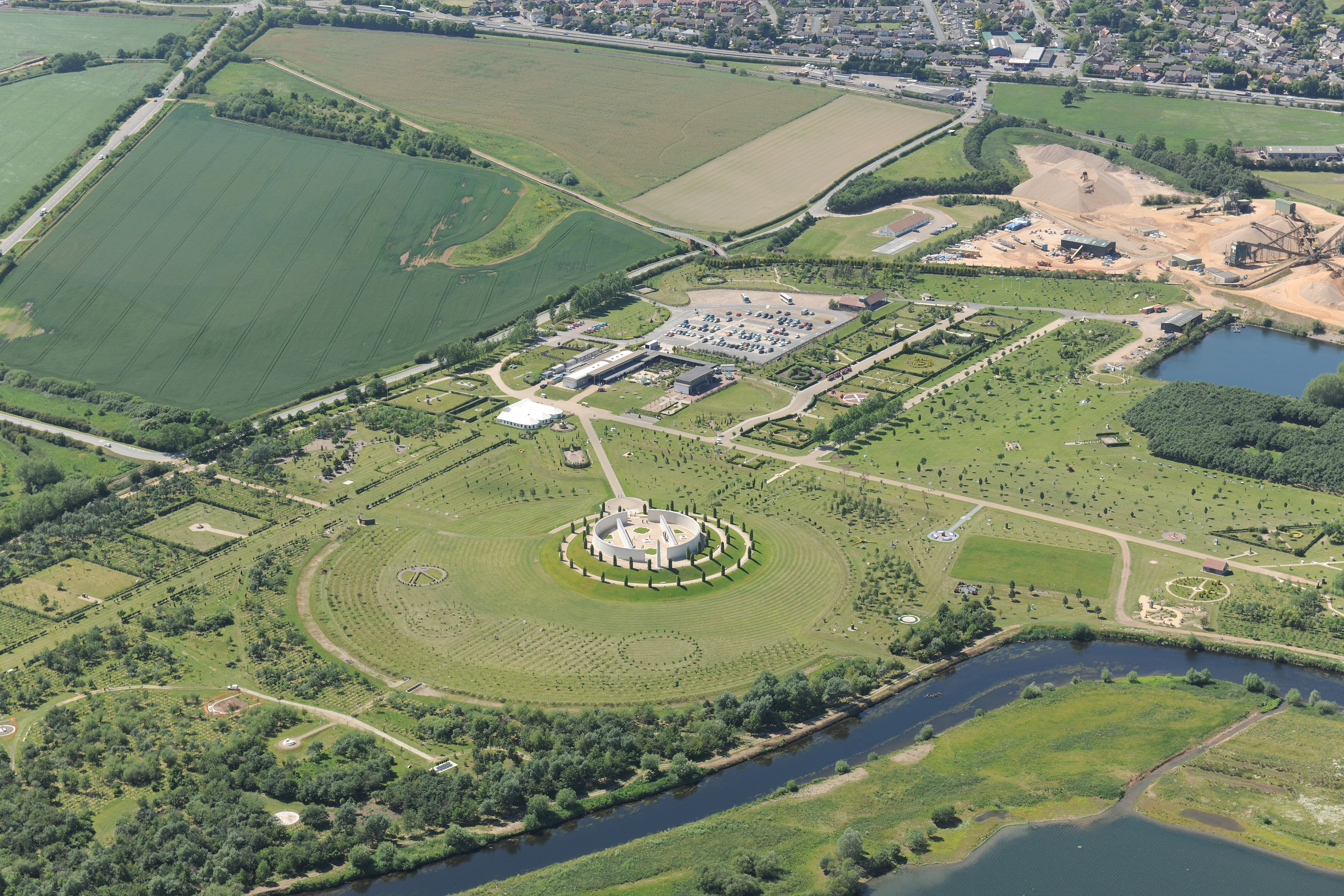
Aerial view of the National Remembrance Gardens, with the River Tame at bottom, 2011

The Royal British Legion National Remembrance Gardens is a British site of national remembrance at Alrewas, near Lichfield, Staffordshire, United Kingdom. Its objective is to honour the fallen, recognise service and sacrifice, and foster pride in His Majesty's Armed Forces and the associated civilian community.

Since 2003, the Royal British Legion has supported the National Remembrance Gardens as its parent charity. Together with volunteers, communities and partners, this has helped the site flourish as the nation’s year-round place to remember, finally integrating fully in 2026.

== Origins ==
The idea for the site was conceived by Commander David Childs, CBE, in 1988, who wished to establish a national focus or 'centre' for Remembrance to those that had died after giving to their community or country. An appeal was launched in 1994 by the then Prime Minister, John Major. He believed that the site would form a living tribute to service men and women for future generations to reflect upon and enjoy while walking through a beautiful green scenery.

The future of the project became assured when three proposals were agreed. These were: for the site to be the location of the Armed Forces Memorial; for the Ministry of Defence to pay a significant grant-in-aid to allow for free entry and that the Royal British Legion would accept the gift of the site as the focus for the nation's year-round Remembrance.

The project began with no money, no land, no staff and no trees, just an idea which was yet to exist in reality. The National Lottery, in the form of the Millennium Commission, granted some forty per cent of the funds needed and this was matched by thousands of donations from a wide variety of organisations both military and civilian, men and women, corporate and voluntary.

Planting began on the reclaimed gravel workings, bordered by the Rivers Trent and Tame, gifted to the charity by Lafarge in 1997. The initial planting took place thanks to grants from the Forestry Commission and the National Forest, and since then has been shaped by a staff of thousands: a small paid group; a dedicated and active Friends organisation; and countless others who have either planted individual trees or helped create a memorial for their organisation.

The site was officially opened on 16 May 2001. It is a registered charity, part of the Royal British Legion.

== Location ==
The Royal British Legion National Remembrance Gardens is situated just south of Alrewas on approximately 150 acres (61 ha; 0.23 sq mi) of old gravel workings, 5 miles (8.0 km) north of Lichfield, Staffordshire. It is adjacent to the confluence of the River Tame with the River Trent, and directly neighbouring Croxall Lakes. It is at the western end of the National Forest, just off the A38 road. The site is also served by Diamond Buses NMA1 service that runs as a limited stop service from Tamworth.

== Features ==
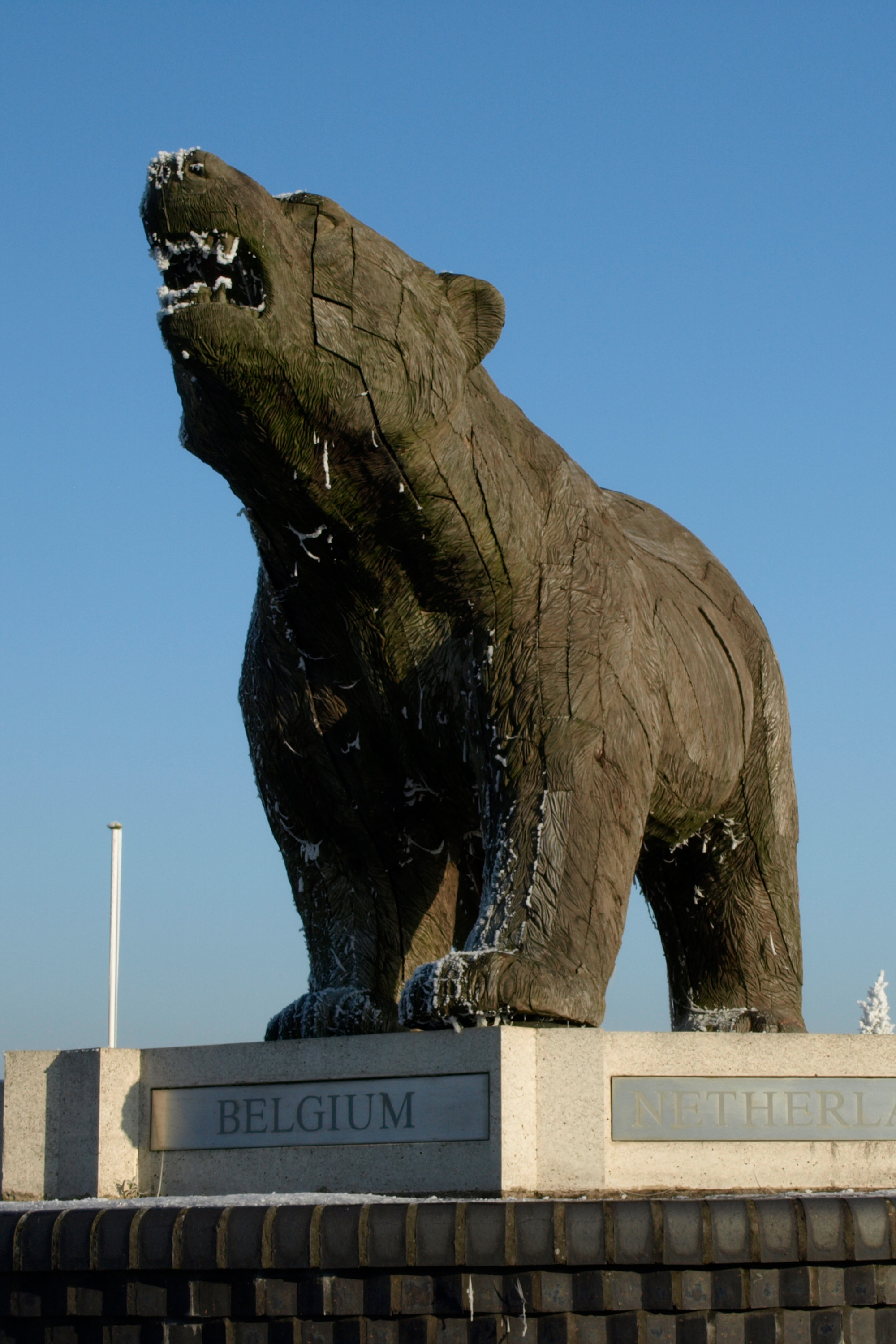
The Polar Bear Memorial was the first memorial dedicated on site, on 7 June 1998.

The National Remembrance Gardens contains more than 25,000 trees. There are more than 400 memorials for the armed forces, civilian organisations and voluntary bodies who have played a part in serving the country; and even HMS Amethyst's cat Simon.

The largest section is the Armed Forces Memorial, at the heart of the Gardens, which is a tribute to over 16,000 service personnel who have lost their lives in conflict or as a result of terrorism since the end of the Second World War. At 11am on 11 November each year the sun shines through two slits in the outer and inner walls of the memorial, casting a shaft of light across a wreath in the centre. The Armed Forces Memorial was dedicated in October 2007 by the Archbishop of Canterbury in the presence of Elizabeth II.

Other areas of the site include an RAF 'wing', Naval review and Army parade. Civilian areas include 'The Beat' which contains memorials and dedications to police forces from around the UK and commonwealth. There is a Nursing Memorial to 1,300 VAD and professional nurses who died in the First and Second World Wars.

Within the National Remembrance Gardens is the Millennium Chapel of Peace and Forgiveness where, at 11 am each day, an act of Remembrance takes place.

Daily activities on site include guided walks, buggy tours, land train rides and free talks, as well as the Daily Act of Remembrance. Most of these activities are conducted by a team of over 260 volunteers, who collectively dedicate more than 52,000 hours of their time per year to the National Remembrance Gardens. In 2010, the Volunteers of the National Remembrance Gardens were awarded The Queen's Award for Voluntary Service.

=== Memorials ===
The Armed Forces Memorial commemorates service men and women killed since 1945. It was designed by Liam O'Connor Architects. The project design team consisted of Liam O'Connor (architect), Christopher Barrett (project manager), Alan Baxter & Associates (structural & civil engineers), Christina Godiksen, Robert Rhodes, and Daniel Benson. The two curved walls and two straight walls are made from bricks covered with Portland stone panels. At the centre of the Memorial are two bronze sculptures created by Ian Rank-Broadley. This memorial remembers over 16,000 people who have been killed or sacrificed their lives while on duty or targeted by terrorists or who died in operational theatres. Their names have been written in a panel to signify their significance in the Armed Forces.

Armed Forces Memorial

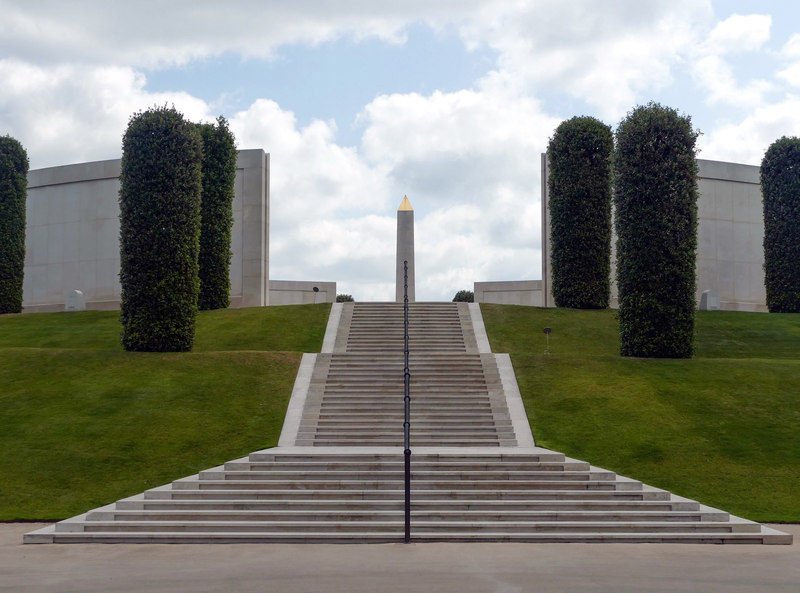

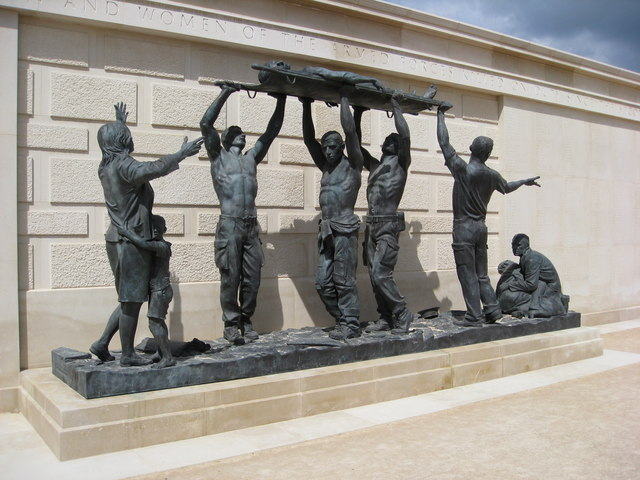

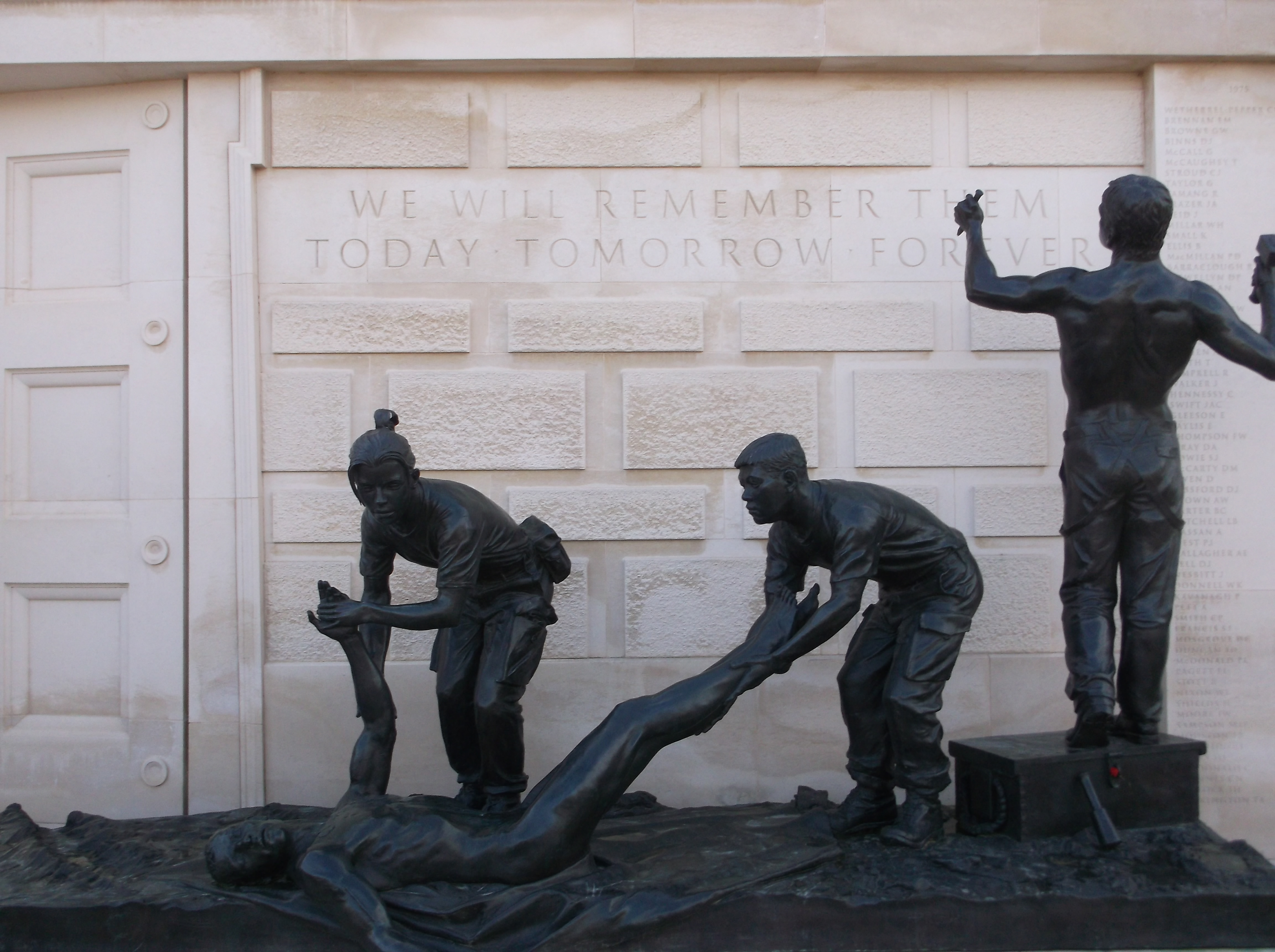

Some of the other features of the National Remembrance Gardens are described below.

Image	Description	Year
	Association of Jewish Ex-Service Men and Women Made from Chinese granite and designed to give a different perspective when viewed from different angles, the Star of David memorial is dedicated to Jewish servicemen who were killed on duty.	
	Berlin Airlift Monument The memorial is erected in tribute to those who took part in the Berlin Airlift, the operation to deliver food and supplies to Berlin between June 1948 and May 1949.	
	Boys' Brigade The elements of this garden represent all parts of the UK and Ireland. The Boys' Brigade Garden is designed to remember those who have served in the Brigade since 1883. Sixteen Victoria Crosses have been awarded to former and serving Brigade members.	
	Burma Railway The memorial is constructed from 30 metres (98 ft) of the original rails and sleepers used on the Burma Railway, which were brought to the Gardens from Thailand in HMS Northumberland in 2002. The memorial is a permanent tribute to those who were forced to construct the infamous 'Railway of Death' and the benches and trees around the railway track have relevant dedications. The memorial was dedicated on 15 August 2002.	2002
	Christmas Truce Memorial On 12 December 2014, a memorial on the centenary of the World War I Christmas truce, when British and German soldiers stopped fighting in the trenches and played football in no man's land, was unveiled by Prince William, Duke of Cambridge, the England national football team manager Roy Hodgson and Greg Dyke, chairman of the Football Association. The Football Remembers memorial was designed by ten-year-old Spencer Turner after a UK-wide competition.	2014
	Commandos The Commandos were formed by the Army in June 1940 as a well-armed but non-regimental raider force employing unconventional and irregular tactics to assault, disrupt and reconnoitre the enemy. This memorial consists of a reproduction of part of the Association badge – the wreath in copper and the Fairbairn–Sykes fighting knife in stainless steel. It was created at Anwick Forge in Lincolnshire.	
	Naval Services Memorial By Graeme Mitcheson. Unveiled on 15 June 2014 the memorial to navy personnel is made up from a number of large pieces of coloured glass and a lone figure with bowed head.	2014
	Polar Bear Memorial The Polar Bear Association Memorial was the first monument and sculpture to be erected at the National Remembrance Gardens. It is a tribute to the 49th Infantry West Riding Division and was dedicated on 7 June 1998. In the Second World War they were stationed in Iceland and as they were snowed in under 20 feet (6.1 m) of snow for most of the campaign, their commanding officer called the men 'his Polar Bears' and the polar bear on a block of ice was soon adopted as their mascot and shoulder flash. Made from yellow hardwood, the bear is 9 ft long (2.7 m) and 5 ft high (1.5 m) and weighs 2.5 tonnes; it was created by the Essex Woodcarvers and took six men a year to carve. Inside the bear is a capsule containing the names of the members of the 49th Division who died, together with relevant letters and documents.	1998
	The Polish Service Men and Women Memorial Main article: Polish Forces War Memorial A dedicated memorial has been erected in recognition of the contribution made by Polish service men and women to the Allied Forces during the Second World War. The centre monument sculptured by Robert Sobocinski was unveiled by Prince Edward, Duke of Kent on 19 September 2009.	2009
	Royal National Lifeboat Institution (RNLI) The RNLI memorial has been landscaped as a pebble, shingle and sand beach. The dramatic figure of a lifeboat man in his 19th-century oilskins and cork life jacket was sculpted by Andrew Fitchett.	
	Shot at Dawn Main article: Shot at Dawn Memorial During the First World War some 306 British and Commonwealth soldiers were shot for desertion or cowardice; the real cause for their offences was often a psychological reaction to the stresses of war which today would be diagnosed as post-traumatic stress syndrome or combat stress reaction. Shot at Dawn is modelled on Private Herbert Burden, of the 1st Battalion Northumberland Fusiliers, who was shot at Ypres in 1915 aged 17.	2001
	Stillbirth and Neonatal Death Society (SANDS) Garden The SANDS Garden is for bereaved parents. At the centre of the garden is a sculpture of the SANDS tear drop logo which was created by John Roberts and the Portland Sculpture Trust to encourage people to sit and touch the central carved figure of the baby.	
	Sumatra Railway Memorial Unveiled in 2001, the Sumatra Railway Memorial was designed by Jack Plant who was captured by the Japanese and forced to work constructing the railway. The memorial commemorates the 700 Allied PoWs who died building the Sumatra Railway. Several thousand captured Allied troops were forced to work on the 100 miles (160 km) railway.	2001
