= 4th Army (German Empire) =

4. Armee; 4th Army
- Flag of the Staff of an Armee Oberkommando (1871–1918)
- Active: 2 August 1914 – 28 January 1919
- Country: German Empire
- Type: Army
- Engagements: World War I: Western Front; Battle of the Frontiers; Battle of the Ardennes; First Battle of the Marne; Race to the Sea; First Battle of Ypres; Second Battle of Ypres; Third Battle of Ypres

Insignia
- Abbreviation: A.O.K. 4

The 4th Army (German: 4. Armee / Armeeoberkommando 4 / A.O.K. 4) was an army level command of the German Army in World War I. It was formed on mobilisation in August 1914 from the VI Army Inspection. The army was disbanded in 1919 during demobilization after the war.

== History ==
At the outset of war, the 4th Army, with the 5th Army, formed the center of the German armies on the Western Front, moving through Luxembourg and Belgium in support of the great wheel of the right wing that was to pin down and defeat the French armies. The 4th Army defeated Belgian forces on the frontier, drove the French out of the Ardennes and then encountered the British Expeditionary Force in the "Race to the Sea" at the First Battle of Ypres. The 4th Army faced the British in Flanders for the rest of the war, notably defending in the Battle of Passchendaele (1917), attacking in the 1918 German spring offensive and finally being pushed back in the Hundred Days Offensive from August 1918.

At the end of the war it was serving as part of Heeresgruppe Kronprinz Rupprecht.

=== Order of Battle, 30 October 1918 ===
By the end of the war, the 4th Army was organised as:

Organization of 4th Army on 30 October 1918
| Army | Corps | Division |
|---|---|---|
| 4th Army | Naval Corps | 1st Naval Division |
| 4th Army | Naval Corps | 2nd Naval Division |
| 4th Army | Naval Corps | two thirds 38th Landwehr Division |
| 4th Army | Naval Corps | one third 3rd Division |
| 4th Army | Naval Corps | 85th Landwehr Division |
| 4th Army | Guards Reserve Corps | 3rd Reserve Division |
| 4th Army | Guards Reserve Corps | two thirds 3rd Division |
| 4th Army | Guards Reserve Corps | 13th Reserve Division |
| 4th Army | Guards Reserve Corps | 16th Bavarian Division |
| 4th Army | Guards Reserve Corps | 36th Reserve Division |
| 4th Army | Guards Reserve Corps | 11th Bavarian Division |
| 4th Army | Guards Reserve Corps | 4th Division |
| 4th Army | Guards Reserve Corps | one third 38th Landwehr Division |
| 4th Army | Guards Reserve Corps | 16th Reserve Division |
| 4th Army | Guards Reserve Corps | 23rd Division |
| 4th Army | Guards Reserve Corps | 3rd Landwehr Division |
| 4th Army | Guards Corps | 26th Division |
| 4th Army | Guards Corps | 19th Division |
| 4th Army | Guards Corps | Guards Ersatz Division |
| 4th Army | Guards Corps | 207th Division |
| 4th Army | Guards Corps | 1st Bavarian Reserve Division |
| 4th Army | Guards Corps | 21st Division |
| 4th Army | Guards Corps | 52nd Reserve Division |
| 4th Army | Guards Corps | 6th Cavalry Schützen Division |
| 4th Army | X Reserve Corps | 49th Reserve Division |
| 4th Army | X Reserve Corps | 23rd Reserve Division |
| 4th Army | X Reserve Corps | 11th Reserve Division |
| 4th Army | X Reserve Corps | 56th Division |
| 4th Army | X Reserve Corps | 6th Bavarian Reserve Division |
| 4th Army | X Reserve Corps | 39th Division |
| 4th Army | X Reserve Corps | 40th Division |

== Noteworthy individuals ==
=== Commanders ===
The 4th Army had the following commanders during its existence.

4th Army
| From | Commander | Previously | Subsequently, |
|---|---|---|---|
| 2 August 1914 | Generaloberst Albrecht, Duke of Württemberg | VI Army Inspectorate (VI. Armee-Inspektion) | Heeresgruppe Albrecht |
| 1 August 1916 | Generalfeldmarschall Albrecht, Duke of Württemberg | VI Army Inspectorate (VI. Armee-Inspektion) | Heeresgruppe Albrecht |
| 25 February 1917 | General der Infanterie Friedrich Sixt von Armin | IV Corps | Resigned |

=== Others ===
The later World War II-era Wehrmacht general Heinz Guderian served as an assistant signals officer (initially as a lieutenant) at 4th Army HQ until his reassignment to the German general staff in 1918.

== Glossary ==
- Armee-Abteilung or Army Detachment in the sense of "something detached from an Army". It is not under the command of an Army so is in itself a small Army.
- Armee-Gruppe or Army Group in the sense of a group within an Army and under its command, generally formed as a temporary measure for a specific task.
- Heeresgruppe or Army Group in the sense of a number of armies under a single commander.

== See also ==
- 4th Army (Wehrmacht) for the equivalent formation in World War II
- German Army order of battle (1914)
- German Army order of battle, Western Front (1918)
- Schlieffen Plan

== Bibliography ==
- Cron, Hermann (2002) [1937]. Imperial German Army 1914–18: Organisation, Structure, Orders-of-Battle. Helion. ISBN 1-874622-70-1.
- Ellis, John; Cox, Michael (1993). The World War I Databook. Aurum Press. ISBN 1-85410-766-6.
