= Naval Corps (German Empire) =

Naval Corps (Marinekorps)
- Flag of the Staff of a Generalkommando (1871–1918)
- Active: 20 November 1914-1919
- Disbanded: 1919
- Country: German Empire
- Engagements: World War I

The Naval Corps (German: Marinekorps) was a corps-sized formation within the Imperial Navy of the German Empire during World War I. It was formed in on 15 December 1914 when a second Naval Division was raised and joined with the first Naval Division. The Naval Corps occupied the Belgian coast for the full duration of the First World War and was responsible for defending the coast and the frontline immediately behind the coast. It was still in existence at the end of the war. The Naval Corps was commanded throughout its existence by Admiral Ludwig von Schröder, brought out of retirement.

== Chronicle ==
After the German invasion of Belgium, the State Secretary of the German Imperial Naval Office von Tirpitz raised on 29 August 1914 a Naval Division. The division was assigned with securing the Belgian and Channel coasts in order to prevent the British using the harbors along these coasts to send reinforcements to the Western Front. On 15 December 1914, a second Naval Division was raised and the two naval divisions were joined in the newly established Naval Corps. The 1st Naval Division defended the coastline in Flanders and the 2nd Naval Division held the land front. The coast defence was reinforced considerably on the orders of Tirpitz, by transferring the idle coastal batteries defending the rivers Elbe, Weser, Jade and the Baltic Sea to Flanders. In June 1917 a third Naval Division was attached to the Naval Corps.

The Flanders U-boat flotilla was constituted on 29 March 1915 in Bruges as part of the Naval Corps. The boats used Zeebrugge and Ostend as exit ports. Commanded by Kapitänleutnant Karl Bartenbach, the force comprised nine Type UB I U-boats at the end of April 1915. On 26 May 1915, the first Type UC I minelayer UC-11 arrived at Zeebrugge and nine more joined that same year.

After the loss of four torpedo boats in the Battle off Texel on 17 October 1914, the German Navy was reluctant to send large torpedo boats to Flanders. But these boats were much needed for the defence of the captured Belgian coast. As a compromise, on 21 May 1915, the Flanders Torpedoboat Flotilla was established as part of the Naval Corps. The flotilla was based in Bruges and equipped with eleven small coastal A-I-class torpedo boats, which were transported in sections by rail to Hoboken and re-assembled there.

== Order of battle ==
=== On 30 October 1918 ===
The Naval Corps was part of the 4th Army, Heeresgruppe Kronprinz Rupprecht, still holding the extreme right of the Western Front.

- 1st Naval Division
- 2nd Naval Division
- two thirds 38th Landwehr Division (Note: The remaining third of 38th Landwehr Division was assigned to the adjacent Guards Reserve Corps.)
- one third 3rd Division (Note: The bulk of 3rd Division was assigned to the adjacent Guards Reserve Corps.)
- 85th Landwehr Division

=== At the end of 1918 ===
MarineKorps Flandern

– Admiral Ludwig von Schröder

1. Strength at the end of 1918:

1st MarineDivision

– 1st Marine-Brigade

1st Seabattalion

2nd Seabattalion

3rd Seabattalion

– 2nd Marine-Pionier-Battalion

– 1st Pioneer Kompanie

– 2nd Matrosen-Artillerie-Regiment

– 3rd Piooner Sturmtrupen Kompanie

2. Strength at the end of 1918:

– 3rd Marine-Brigade

– 1st Schwere Waffen Kompanie

– 2nd Schwere Waffen Kompanie

– 3rd Marine Regiment

– 1st Marine-Feldartilleriebatterie

– 4th Marine-Brigade

– 2nd Marine-Feldartilleriebatterie

– 4th Matrosen-Regiment

–3rd Marine-Pionier-Kompanie

3. Strength at creation on July 1, 1917

3rd MarineDivision

– Marine-Infanterie-Brigade

– 9th Feldartillerie-Regiment

– 1st Marine-Infanterie-Regiment

– 115th Pionier-Bataillon

– 2nd Marine-Infanterie-Regiment

– 1st Reserve-Kompagnie, 24th Marinebattalion

– 3rd Marine-Infanterie-Regiment

– 3rd Eskadron

– 160th Minenwerfer-Kompagnie

– 7th Husaren-Regiment

== See also ==
- German Army (German Empire)
- German Army order of battle, Western Front (1918)
- 63rd (Royal Naval) Division

== Bibliography ==
- Cron, Hermann (2002) [1937]. Imperial German Army 1914–18: Organisation, Structure, Orders-of-Battle. Solihull: Helion. ISBN 1-874622-70-1.
- De Groot, Bas (2017). Het Duitse Marinekorps in Vlaanderen 1914-1918. De land-, zee- en luchtoorlog [The German Naval Corps in Flanders 1914-1918. The war at land, on the sea and in the air.] (in Dutch). Soesterberg: Aspekt. ISBN 9789463380478.
- Ellis, John; Cox, Michael (1993). The World War I Databook. London: Aurum Press. ISBN 1-85410-766-6.
- Termote, Tomas (2014). Oorlog onder Water, Unterseeboots Flottille Flandern 1915-1918 [War below sea, submarine flottille Flanders 1915-1918] (in Dutch). Leuven: Davidsfonds. ISBN 978-90-5908-526-8.
