= 14th (Service) Battalion, Gloucestershire Regiment (West of England) =

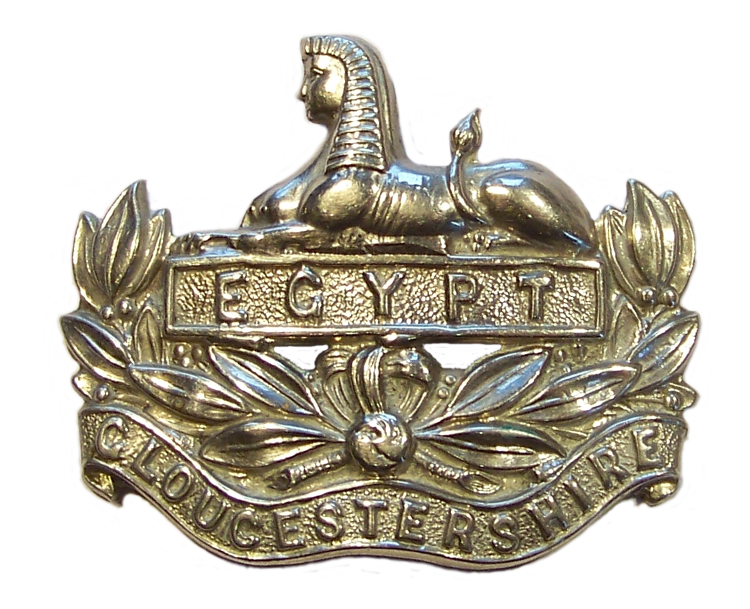
- Cap badge of the Gloucestershire Regiment
- Active: 22 April 1915–11 February 1918
- Allegiance: United Kingdom
- Branch: New Army
- Type: Bantam battalion
- Role: Infantry
- Size: One battalion
- Part of: 35th Division
- Garrison/HQ: Bristol
- Nickname: West of England Bantams
- Patron: Bristol Citizens' Recruiting Committee
- Engagements: Battle of the Somme; German retreat to the Hindenburg Line; The Knoll; Battle of Passchendaele

Insignia
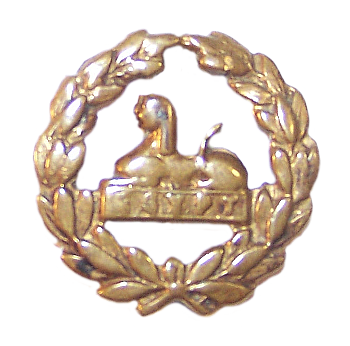
- Back badge

The 14th (Service) Battalion, Gloucestershire Regiment (West of England) ('14th Glosters') was a Bantam battalion recruited in World War I as part of 'Kitchener's Army' from men who were below the minimum height normally required by the British Army. Together with other bantam battalions it joined the 35th Division and served with it on the Western Front from early 1916, first seeing action at the Battle of the Somme. The Bantam concept did not survive the losses of the Somme, and had to be abandoned when the battalions became filled with reinforcements who were not simply undersized but actually unfit for service. In 1917 the 14th Glosters became a conventional infantry battalion and saw further action during operations along the Hindenburg Line, when one of its officers won the Victoria Cross, and at the Battle of Passchendaele before being broken up early in 1918 to provide reinforcements to other units.

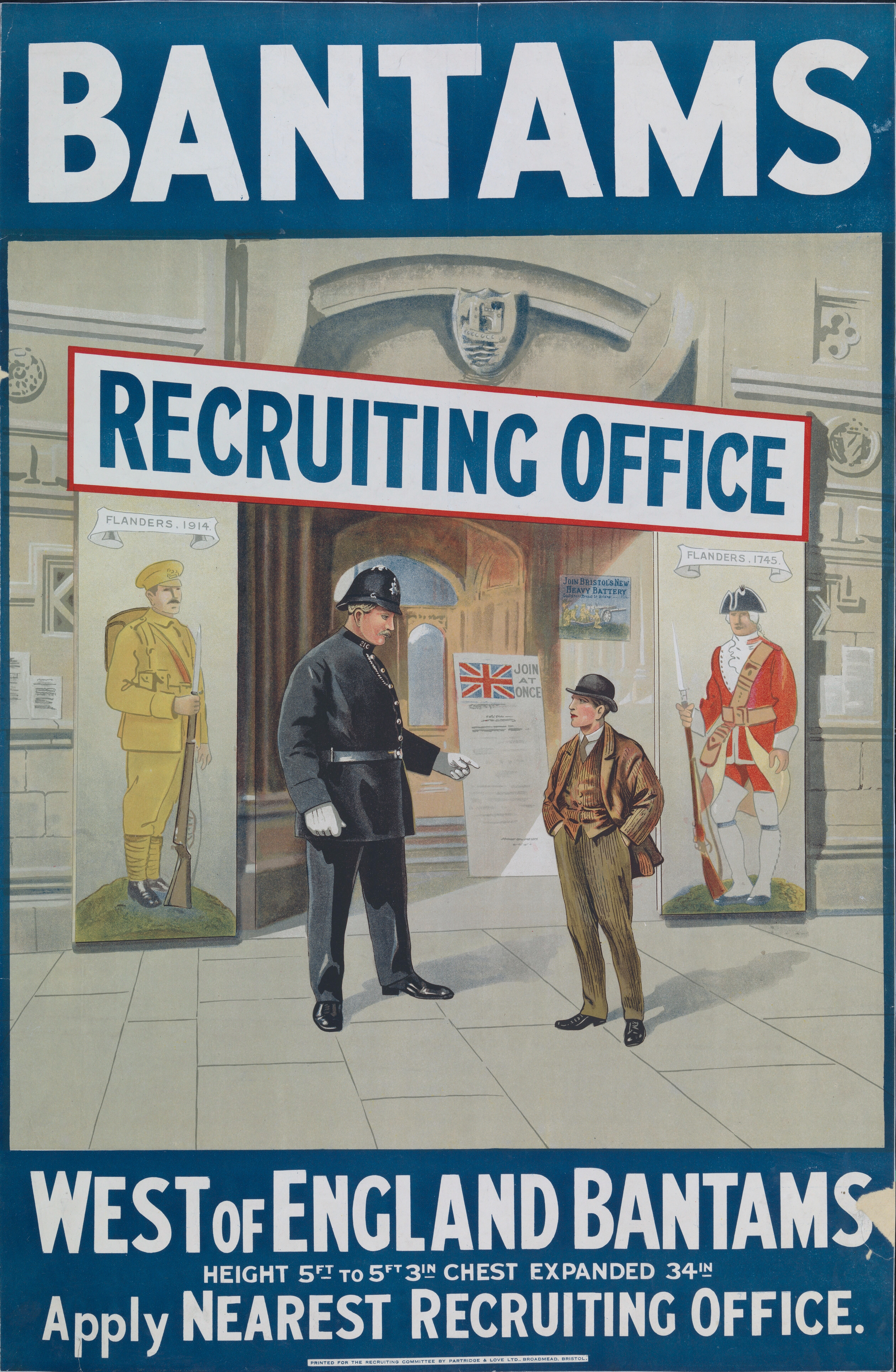
Recruiting poster for the battalion.

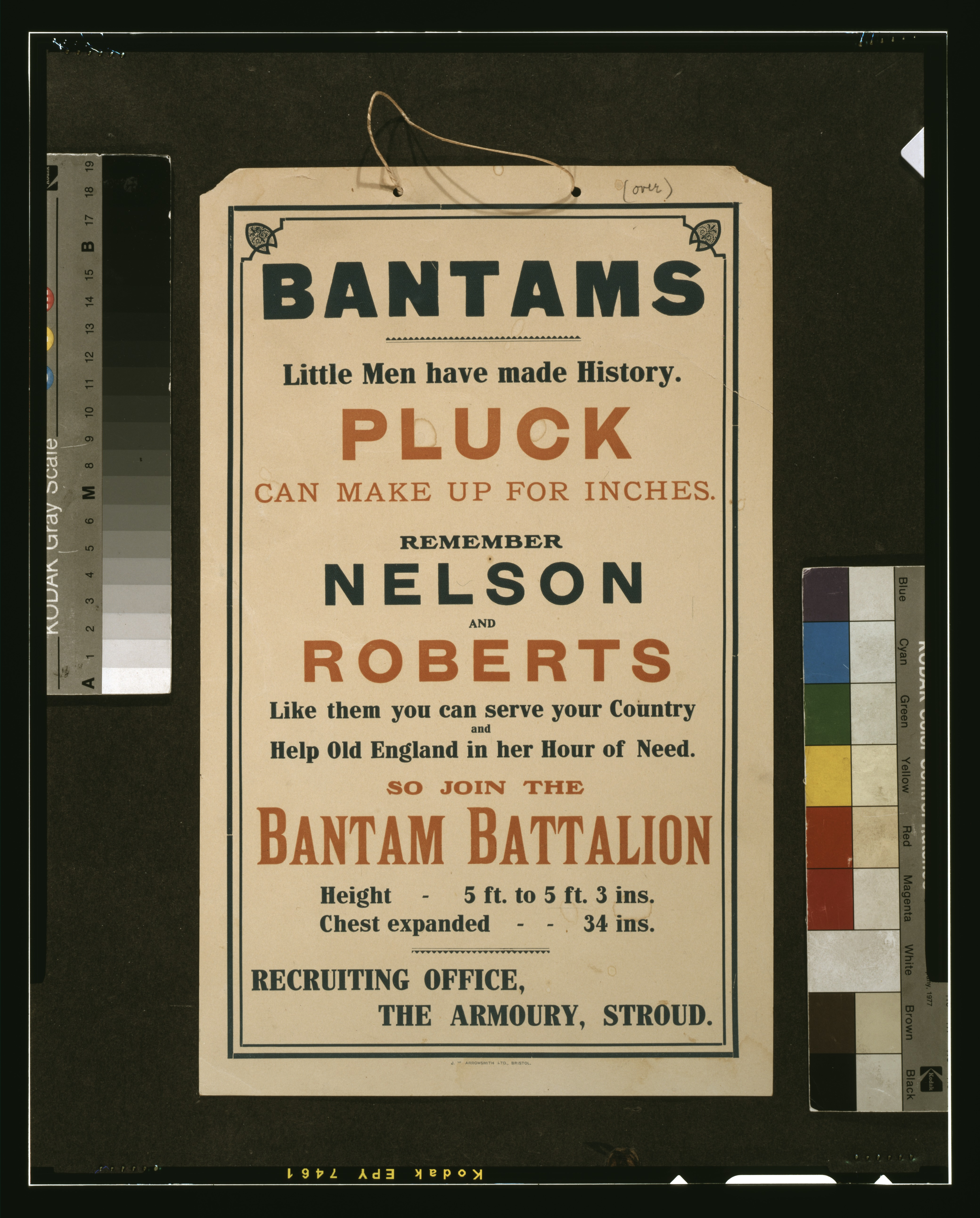
Recruiting poster for the battalion at Stroud recruiting office.

== Background ==
On 6 August 1914, less than 48 hours after Britain's declaration of war, Parliament sanctioned an increase of 500,000 men for the Regular British Army, and the newly-appointed Secretary of State for War, Earl Kitchener of Khartoum issued his famous call to arms: 'Your King and Country Need You', urging the first 100,000 volunteers to come forward. This group of six divisions with supporting arms became known as Kitchener's First New Army, or 'K1'. The flood of volunteers overwhelmed the ability of the army to absorb and organise them, and by the time the Fifth New Army (K5) was authorised on 10 December 1914, many of the units were being organised as 'Pals battalions' under the auspices of mayors and corporations of towns up and down the country.

However, a large number of otherwise medically fit volunteers were turned away because they did not meet the minimum height requirement of the prewar Regular Army, of 5 feet 3 inches (160 cm). Alfred Bigland, the Member of Parliament for Birkenhead, persuaded Kitchener that this pool of potential manpower should be tapped, and he was given authority to raise a battalion of 'Bantams' (named after the small but pugnacious fighting cock), also known as 'Bobs' Own' after the popular Field Marshal Earl Roberts, who was short of stature. Three Bantam battalions were quickly raised at Birkenhead for the Cheshire Regiment, many of them coal miners who had travelled long distances to enlist, and the scheme spread to other areas. The War Office (WO) authorised each military district to recruit a bantam battalion. By the end of the year an entire division (later numbered 35th Division) composed of Bantam battalions was being formed.

== Recruitment & training ==
The West of England Bantam Battalion was formed at Bristol by the Citizens' Recruiting Committee (who had already formed the 12th (Service) Battalion, Gloucestershire Regiment (Bristol's Own) in August 1914). The bantam battalion was retrospectively authorised on 22 April 1915 and recruited mainly from Bristol and Birmingham; there was also a recruiting office at Stroud. The first commanding officer (CO) was Lieutenant-Colonel Gerard Roberts, who had formerly served in the 4th Volunteer Battalion of the Durham Light Infantry.

The new battalion was assigned to the 105th Brigade of 35th Division, serving alongside the 15th and 16th Cheshires (1st and 2nd Birkenhead Bantams) and the 15th Sherwood Foresters (Nottingham Bantams). In June the brigade began to assemble at a tented camp on Roomer Common outside Masham in North Yorkshire, and the WO officially took over the 14th Glosters from the Citizen's Committee on 23 June. While at Masham a number of unfit or under-age men were removed from the division.

In August 35th Division moved by rail to Salisbury Plain for final intensive training, with the infantry at Tidworth Camp. In December the division received orders to prepare for service in Egypt, and all ranks were issued with tropical uniforms. It was unkindly said that the bantams on Salisbury Plain in their oversized pith helmets resembled overgrown mushrooms. However, the division's destination was shortly afterwards changed to the Western Front and the pith helmets were exchanged for caps and gas masks. Embarkation for France began on 28 January 1916 and 14th Glosters landed at Le Havre on 31 January. By 6 February the division had completed its concentration east of Saint-Omer.

=== 15th (Reserve) Battalion ===
The battalion's depot companies joined with those of 12th (Bristol's Own) to form 15th (Reserve) Bn at Sutton Coldfield on 31 August 1915 with the role of training reinforcements for the two battalions. The 15th Battalion moved to Chiseldon Camp in Wiltshire and joined 22nd Reserve Brigade. On 1 September 1916 the Local Reserve battalions were transferred to the Training Reserve (TR) and the battalion was designated 93rd Training Reserve Battalion in 22nd Reserve Bde. On 4 July 1917 it was redesignated 262nd (Infantry) Battalion, TR. When the Training Reserve was reorganised in late 1917, the battalion transferred to the Royal Warwickshire Regiment as 51st (Graduated) Battalion. After the war it was converted into a service battalion on 8 February 1918 and sent to the British Army of the Rhine. It was finally disbanded in Germany on 12 February 1920.

== Service ==
After a series of moves, 14th Glosters arrived at La Pannerie, where it went into billets. Once in France the division continued training, with particular emphasis on 'bombing' and machine guns. In late February 1916 the units of 105th Bde went into the line in the Neuve-Chapelle sector alongside the more experienced 38th (Welsh) Division for instruction in Trench warfare. On 27 February 14th Glosters marched to Le Touret to be attached to 115th Bde:

- W Company to 16th Welsh Regiment (Cardiff City) in the 1st line trenches
- X Company to 11th South Wales Borderers (2nd Gwent) in the 1st line trenches
- Y Company to 10th South Wales Borderers (1st Gwent) in close support at Festubert
- Z Company and Battalion HQ to 17th Royal Welsh Fusiliers (2nd North Wales) in reserve at Le Touret

Over the following days the companies rotated between the first, support and reserve lines. The Bantams were each provided with two sandbags to place on the firestep so that they could stand on them to see over the parapet of the trench. The unit suffered its first casualties with three men wounded. On 7 March 35th Division took responsibility for its own section of the line, but 14th Glosters was billeted behind the line, first at Robecq and then at Calonne, where it provided working parties and continued anti-gas and musketry training. On the evening of 26 March 105th Bde carried out a relief and 14th Glosters took over the line near Laventie with W and X Companies in the forward posts. The battalion then relieved 15th Cheshires in the left sub-section. During the changeover the 15th Cheshires handed over the steel helmets they had been issued with: these were still scarce and until June there were only enough for the frontline units. 14th Glosters then began alternating (usually with 15th Cheshires or 15th Sherwood Foresters) between the front and support lines and reserve billets. While in the line the battalions carried out continual repairs to shell-damaged trenches; while in billets they supplied working parties for the Royal Engineers (REs). During the second week of May the battalion was in divisional reserve at Vieille-Chapelle, then it took over the Neuve-Chapelle sector on 14 May.

Both sides carried out trench raids. At 19.20 on the evening of 30 May the Germans laid down a heavy bombardment on the fire and support trenches held by 15th Sherwood Foresters, who were due to be relieved by 14th Glosters that night. The British artillery promptly opened up in reply but the Foresters' trenches were almost obliterated. At 20.30 a breathless runner arrived at 14th Glosters' Battalion HQ with the message 'Send reinforcements, the Germans have broken through'. 105th Brigade HQ ordered Lt-Col Roberts to send a company up to 'Lansdown Post' and to occupy the reserve line with the rest of the battalion; he also had the Lewis gunners and the HQ details of 15th Sherwood Foresters who had already left the line for the relief. Y Company under Lieutenant H.C. Kinred reached Lansdown Post at 21.35 and reported to the CO of 15th Sherwood Foresters. At 23.15 this company went up into the front line to support the Foresters and Bde HQ ordered forward another company: Roberts sent X Company under Captain H.A. Butt. By now 15th Foresters and the battalions to either flank had driven out the attackers and W and Z Companies could be stood down. X and Y Companies remained in the front line helping the Foresters and REs to repair the trenches. The planned relief was successfully carried out the following night. On 2 June a party of Germans threw bombs into the trench held by the centre company of 14th Glosters. Lieutenant Kinred threw himself flat on one of the bombs, saving five of his men; he was wearing body armour, which protected him from serious injury. He was awarded the Military Cross (MC) for this act. 14th Glosters carried out its own raid on the night of 8/9 June against the trenches opposite the 'Pope's Nose'. At 21.00 the artillery, trench mortars and machine guns opened an intense bombardment of the enemy line. The Germans sent up red rockets and their artillery responded within three minutes. Unfortunately the first shell that came over killed Lt-Col Roberts (he is buried at Pont-Du-Hem Military Cemetery at La Gorgue). The second-in-command, Major B.M. Vernon, was cut off with the right company by the shellfire, so the adjutant, Capt F.H. Toop, took control of the battalion. Meanwhile the raiders and the covering party had left their trenches at 21.05 and lay down in No man's land before the guns lifted to form a standing barrage and the raiders went in at 21.20. They were met by rifle and machine gun fire but got into the front trench and fought their way along it, bombing the dugouts and driving the defenders back into the barrage. Captain Butt was wounded, and was killed by a shell as he was being evacuated. The clearing up party entered the trench behind the raiders but found little work to do. Some machine gun emplacements were destroyed and one gun dragged back to British lines. The casualties were 2 officers killed and 1 wounded, 3 other ranks (ORs) killed, 15 wounded and 4 missing. Having made his report Maj Vernon was evacuated sick; Lt-Col Alfred Radice, a Regular officer of the Glosters, arrived to take command on 21 June. The battalion was relieved the day after the raid and the whole division went into rest billets in GHQ Reserve. The captured machine gun was presented to the Mayor and Corporation of Bristol. Captain Toop was awarded the Distinguished Service Order (DSO) for his leadership.

=== Somme ===
The BEF had been preparing for that summer's 'Big Push' (the Battle of the Somme), which was launched on 1 July. 35th Division entrained on the night of 2/3 July to join Fourth Army in the Somme sector, with 14th Glosters billeted at Lucheux, then at Beauval. From 10 July it began a series of marches up to the front, taking over the support trenches at the Bricqueterie near Maricourt on 17 July. Lt-Col Radice was invalided on 13 July and Lt-Col William Foord, a Regular officer of the Glosters, took over command.

35th Division had been in reserve for the Battle of Bazentin Ridge on 15 July, but 14th Glosters had not been called upon. The battalion took over the front line in Trônes Wood on 19 July, relieving 16th Cheshires who had been desperately defending Waterlot Farm. Next morning 15th Sherwood Foresters attempted to capture Maltz Horn Farm: one company reached the German trench but were driven out and the whole battalion suffered severe casualties. 23rd Manchester Regiment (104th Bde) then made a second unsuccessful attack. 14th Glosters was not engaged while this was going on, but was heavily shelled, losing 2 officers and 23 ORs killed, 4 officers and 70 ORs wounded and 10 missing. The whole of 105th Bde was relieved next day.

On 24 July the battalion was back in the reserve trenches and next day it received 200 OR reinforcements from the base depot. On 26 July it went into the support trenches in Bernafy Wood and provided working parties under frequent bombardment. On 30/31 July it was relieved, the relief being carried out under heavy bombardment with high explosive and gas shells. It then marched to camp in Sand Pit Valley before moving on to Bois de Tailles and then Riencourt, north west of Amiens, where the men (particularly the reinforcements) underwent training for the attack and consolidation of positions,. On 10 August the battalion went by train to Méricourt and marched to 'Citadel Camp'. Here it continued training but also provided large working parties to dig trenches in the Trônes Wood and Maltz Horn Farm area. On the evening of 19 August the battalion marched up to 'Lancaster' and 'Dawson' trenches, and the following night took over the front line from 16th Cheshires, with two companies in 'Lamb Trench' and two in reserve in 'Overflow Trench'. 35th Division had taken over the attacks towards Guillemont. The Cheshires' planned attack had been disrupted by heavy artillery fire, and instead 14th Glosters was ordered to reconnoitre and if possible occupy a strongpoint in the enemy line opposite 'Arrow Head Copse'. A platoon went out at 05.00 on 21 August and returned half an hour later having suffered casualties, reporting that the strongpoint was strongly manned with machine guns. Indeed, two small attacks were made on the battalion from the strongpoint next day: these were driven off with Lewis gun fire. A planned attack on the strongpoint by 14th Glosters and 15th Sherwood Foresters was called off when the British heavy artillery failed to damage it. 35th Division discharged smoke to assist the neighbouring attacks but took no part, although 14th Glosters were under constant shellfire, and casualties mounted. The battalion was relieved on the evening of 23 August, withdrawing down communication trenches under shellfire. 35th Division was then relieved on 26 August, 14th Glosters going back to Sand Pit Valley, before entraining on 30 August to join Third Army in the Arras area to the north.

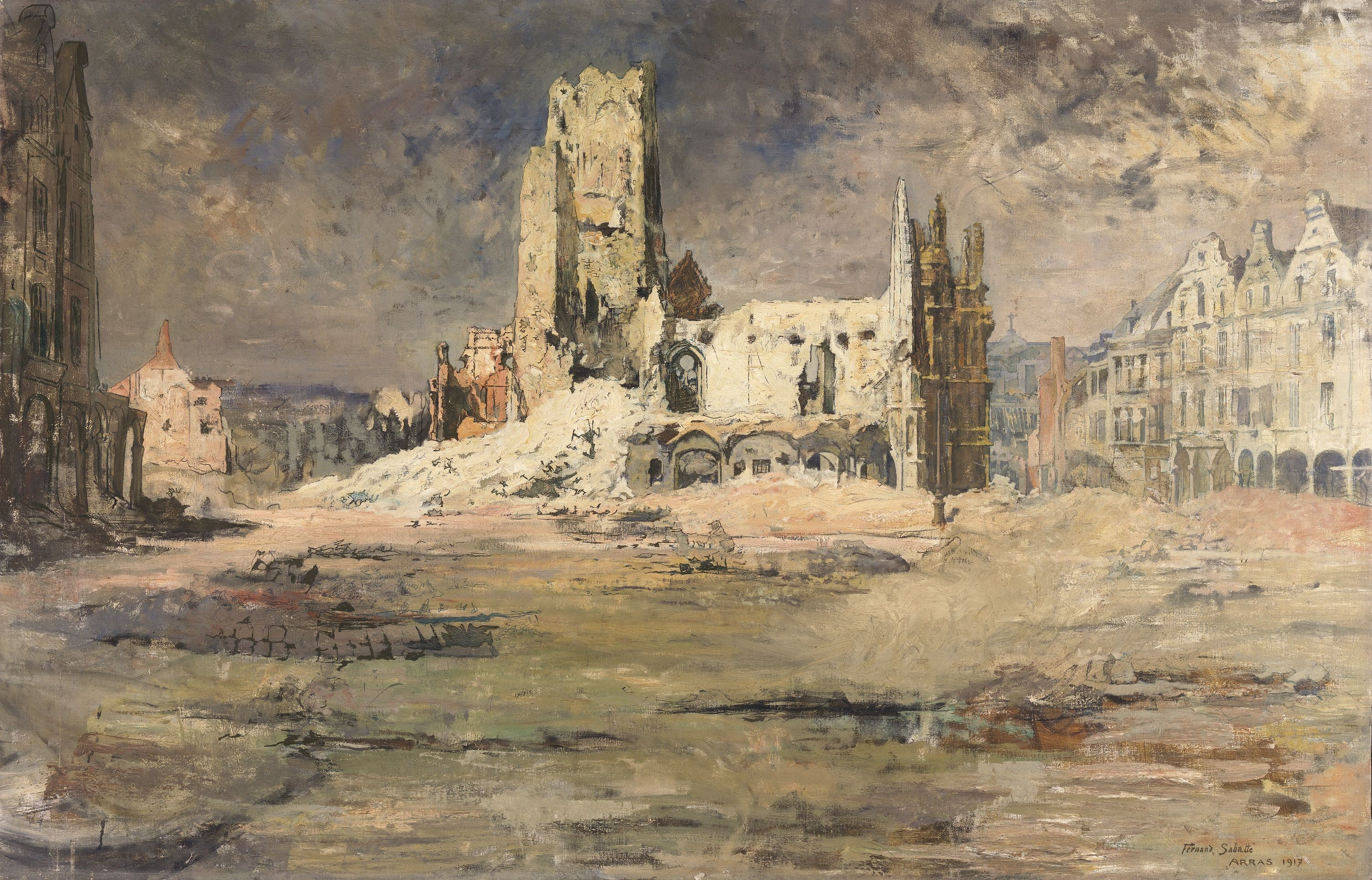
The ruined belfry in Arras 1916, by Fernand Sabatté.

On arrival at Arras on 3 September 14th Glosters was in reserve, but the town was under intermittent shellfire and the battalion had to supply large working parties to clean and strengthen the ramshackle trenches the division had taken over from French troops (including raising the firesteps so the bantams could fire over the parapet). The trenches then had to be constantly repaired as they collapsed under winter rain. Shelling, mortaring, mining and gas cloud releases were common on this front, as well as trench raids. After a long spell at the front, 35th Division was reliatgoing to Manin–Givenchy-le-Noble.

=== End of the Bantams ===
35th Division's formation sign after 'de-Bantamisation'.

By the end of 1916 14th Glosters had suffered total casualties of 6 officers killed and 14 wounded, 68 ORs killed, 296 wounded, and 27 missing. After the Maltz Horn Farm attacks the commander of 35th Division, Major-General Reginald Pinney, had written 'The best type of Bantams done in'. and in August he was complaining of the poor physique of the reinforcements he was being sent. Pinney wanted a meeting with GHQ to discuss the future of the bantams. On 8 December his successor (Maj-Gen Herman Landon) complained that the replacement drafts he had received were not of the same tough physical standard as the original bantams but were undeveloped, unfit men from the towns. A subsequent medical inspection rejected 1439 men of the division and a second inspection removed another batch, bringing the total to 2784. Between 10 December and 1 January 1917 14th Glosters had 255 men 'combed out' and sent to the base as unfit. These men were mainly sent to the Labour Corps. Their places were filled with men transferred from disbanded Yeomanry Cavalry regiments; these had to be quickly retrained as infantry and a divisional depot was formed for the purpose (it is not clear how many of these 14th Glosters received). Original bantams who passed the medical inspection remained in place. The 35th Division was officially 'de-Bantamised' on 22 January 1917 and replaced its 'Bantam Cock' divisional sign with a circle of seven 5s.

=== Hindenburg Line ===
35th Division returned to the Arras trenches at the end of December 1916. 14th Glosters carried out specialist training and provided working parties in the support and reserve lines; the town was still under frequent heavy bombardment. Lieutenant-Col Foord was awarded a 'periodic' in the 1917 New Year Honours. The division was withdrawn to billets at the beginning of February, 14th Glosters going to Moncheaux. Here training in new infantry tactics was carried out. (Note: Following the General Staff training manual SS 143, Instructions for the Training of Platoons for Offensive Action, issued 14 February 1917.) On 21 February the battalion took over trenches from the French at Chilly at the southern end of the old Somme battlefield, finding the trenches flooded and 'very bad'. Cases of frostbite and Trench foot were common in the division, and the British front and support lines were heavily bombarded on 23 February. The Germans raided 14th Glosters' line on 26 February but were driven off. On 1 March the battalion was relieved and went back to dugouts at Maricourt as the duty support battalion, clearing the dugouts and communication trenches. After a week it went back to a rest camp at Decauville. It practised attacks and then went back into the line at Lihons on 14/15 March. The German retreat to the Hindenburg Line (Operation Alberich) began in this sector on 16 March. The battalion sent out 'energetic patrols' who reported that the enemy line was still held. Next morning the right company put up a smoke barrage to assist a raid by the neighbouring battalion. The enemy were very quiet and that evening the battalion's patrols reported the German front line to be unoccupied. Next day 14th Glosters occupied 'Hambourg Trench' and patrolled beyond. 15th Sherwood Foresters then took up the pursuit, while 14th Glosters went back to Lihons as support battalion. On 23 March it moved to Curchy, where the whole battalion was put to work to repair the Chaulnes–Nesle railway across the area devastated by the Germans.

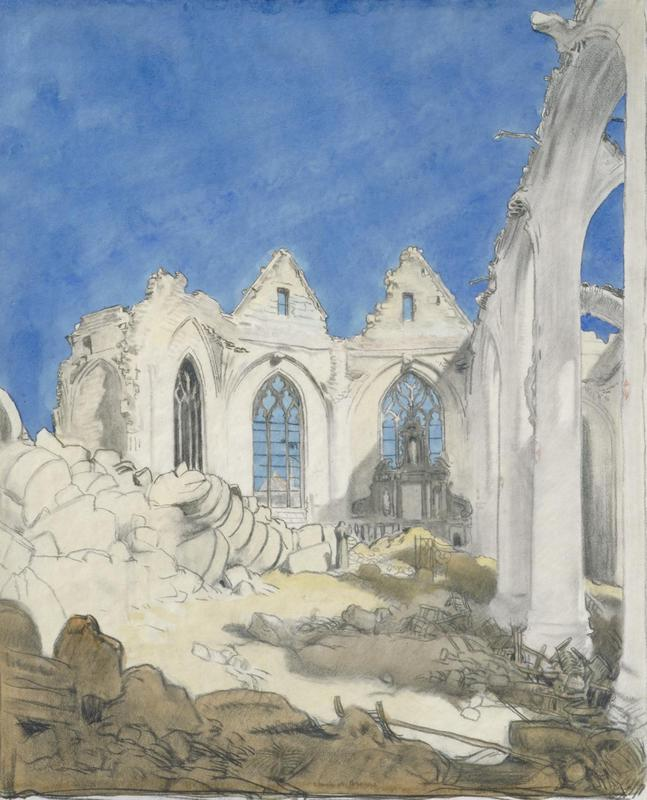
The ruins of Péronne, by Sir William Orpen.

After three weeks of rail and road repairs, 35th Division was shifted towards St Quentin, where the Hindenburg Line ran in front of the town. On 11 April it took over newly-dug trenches at Maissemy facing the German positions. The positions were not completely settled, and there was considerable patrolling and raiding. 14th Glosters trained at Monchy-Lagache 11–16 April and then took over the outpost line at Gricourt with a company in support at Fresnoy-le-Petit. Patrols found most of the positions in front unoccupied, and over the following days the Germans shelled them, unaware that the Glosters only occupied them at night, though Battalion HQ at Fresnoy was also shelled. 14th Glosters now began alternating with 15th Sherwood Foresters at Gricourt until the end of the month, when they went into divisional reserve at Villeveque and practised open warfare. From 9 May the battalion alternated between Gricourt and the support line at 'Keeper's Lodge'. The enemy was observed to occupy an outpost at Les Trois Sauvage during the night and to evacuate it at dawn. On 14 May the divisional artillery opened rapid fire at dawn while the Lewis guns of 14th Glosters cooperated with indirect fire, causing heavy casualties; the Germans replied with trench mortars and rifle grenades on the Gloster's front line. Two days later Private Blick of 14th Glosters noticed two British soldiers lying in No man's land after a raid by 15th Sherwood Foresters; he twice went out to rescue them. One was dead but Blick successfully brought in the survivor. (Blick was awarded the Distinguished Conduct Medal (DCM)) From 20 May the battalion was billeted at Tertry before moving into the battered town of Péronne, then bivouacking at nearby Aizecourt-le-Bas. On 2 June 35th Division shifted a few miles north to the Gauche Wood sector, where again the defences were not continuous trenches but a line of detached posts facing the Hindenburg Line. 14th Glosters was at Villers-Guislain. While out of the front line battalions worked on wiring and improving the chain of outposts and in digging a 'Brown Line' and a 'Green Line' behind. It was a quiet sector, but raiding was common, and on 1 July W and X Companies of 14th Glosters in Gauche Wood were subjected to a heavy bombardment and defeated two enemy raiding parties, one of which was driven off by Sergeant Boardman and Pte Balderson who left the trench and attacked with the bayonet, capturing one raider. On the night of 1/2 July the division went into reserve, with 14th Glosters at Villers-Faucon. When it returned to the front a week later 35th Division had moved to Épehy, where the front line positions sloping down towards the Hindenburg Line along the St Quentin Canal had to be strengthened and the outposts linked up. 14th Glosters held Épehy, and camped at Aizecourt when out of the line.

=== The Knoll ===
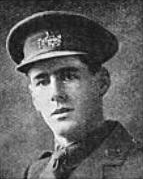
2nd Lieutenant Hardy Parsons won the VC.

Although the British line was on the higher ground, it was overtopped by a feature known as 'The Knoll' that the Germans retained. On 1/2 August 105th Brigade was taken out of the line to prepare for an attack on this disputed position, practising over a full-scale replica of the Knoll trenches laid out at Aizecourt. The date was set for 15 August, but was delayed until 19 August to allow three Heavy Artillery Groups to be brought up to support the operation. (14th Glosters briefly returned to defend the line on the night of 4/5 August when 104th Bde carried out a raid.) While the artillery stockpiled ammunition and registered their guns, other preparations for the operation included the provision of battle HQs for the brigade and battalions, with buried communication cables, dugouts for the additional troops and the trench mortars, and new forming-up trenches for the assaulting troops. The battalions moved up to Lempire on 17–18 August. 105th Brigade held the line with 16th Cheshires and attacked at Zero (04.00 on 19 August) with 15th Cheshires and 15th Sherwood Foresters; 14th Glosters remained at Lempire in reserve. The attack went well: by 05.40 the assaulting companies were returning with their prisoners and wounded and the consolidating companies were blocking the ends of the captured trenches and clearing dugouts. Carrying parties of 16th Cheshire were taking forward the stores needed to consolidate and hold the captured ground. That night 14th Glosters went up to relieve the 15th Cheshires and 15th Foresters and to wire a new trench across the forward crest of the Knoll. Although they shelled the new trenches, the Germans did not make a serious attempt to recapture the Knoll until 03.15 on 21 August when they made three attacks, that on the right (south) being covered by flamethrowers, which forced the defenders of the southern bombing post back. Although badly burned, the commander of the post, Second lieutenant Hardy Parsons, stood his ground, holding off the attackers with bombs until he was severely wounded. The bombing party then rallied and recovered the ground. The other two attacks failed. Parsons died of his injuries but was awarded a posthumous Victoria Cross (VC). He is buried at Villers-Faucon Communal Cemetery. Apart from Parsons the battalion's casualties in this defence were light: 1 other officer wounded, 4 ORs killed or died of wounds, and 18 wounded, of whom one was injured accidentally and one remained at his post. 14th Glosters was relieved on 22/23 August and withdrew to the old front line where it supplied carrying and wiring parties to the Knoll. Unfortunately, the British heavy artillery left for other duties, and without its support 106th Bde were unable to hold the Knoll against a heavy German counter-attack on 30 August.

=== Ypres ===
14th Glosters spent most of September providing working parties behind the lines. At 01.00 on 29 September a fighting patrol from the battalion attempted a raid on 'Crawford Crater', but the covering mist dispersed when the patrol reached the enemy wire. The Germans opened a heavy fire and some advanced to the wire to throw bombs. Although the patrol attempted to breach the wire with Bangalore torpedoes they were forced to retire with some casualties. On 1 October the battalion went by lorry to Péronne and entrained for Arras. Here the division began training in preparation for a move to Ypres Salient where the Third Ypres Offensive had been raging for two months. 14th Glosters trained at Dainville: while the reinforcement drafts practised musketry and bayonet fighting, the Lewis gun, bombing and rifle grenade sections of each platoon carried out their specialist training.

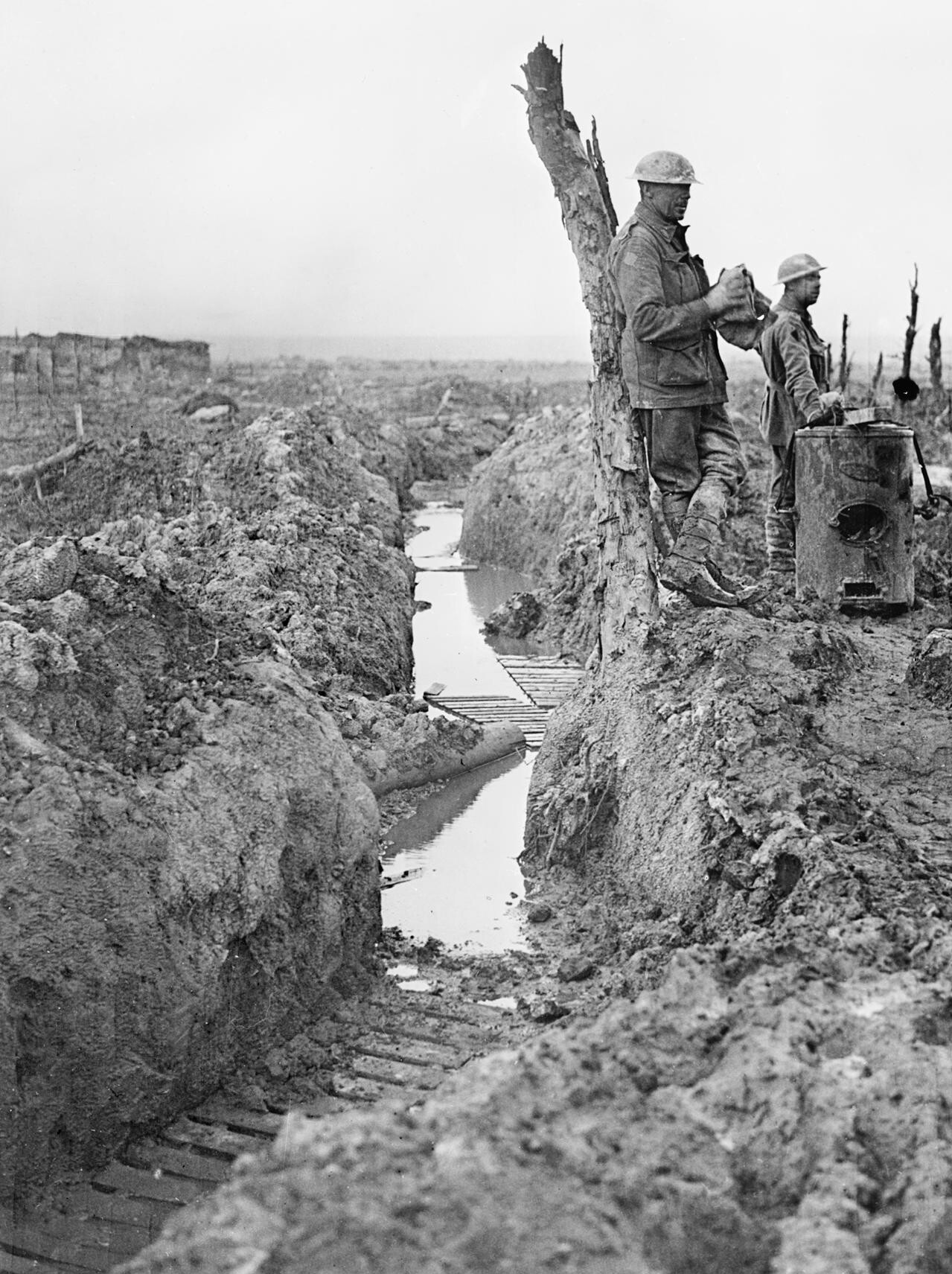
A typical waterlogged trench in the 1917 Ypres offensive.

On 13 October 35th Division entrained for the Salient and three days later 105th Bde took over the support line at Elverdinge. Fifth Army was preparing for a final attempt to gain the high ground (the Second Battle of Passchendaele), and 35th Division was tasked with a preliminary advance into the wreckage of Houthulst Forest to protect the left flank of the projected attack. The ground was covered with water-filled shellholes, movement was by duckboard tracks across the mud, and positions were frequently shelled with Mustard gas, bombed at night, or strafed by aircraft in daylight. 105th Brigade took up positions on the Division's left on 20 October, with 14th Glosters on the extreme left in touch with the 1st French Division. At 02.00 on 22 October the infantry formed up on tapes in No man's land to avoid the inevitable enemy barrage on their trenches when the battle opened. The men lay out in rain, their rifles becoming clogged with mud, but those of 14th Glosters did receive a rum ration at 04.30. The 'Action of 22 October 1917' was launched at 05.35, with the infantry following a slow creeping barrage (100 yards (91 m) every 8 minutes). Keeping a close as possible to the barrage the prompt arrival of the leading companies surprised some of the defenders and a number of Germans were taken prisoner. The battalion reached its first objective without much difficulty, though the left company came under heavy machine gun fire from a pillbox at 'Panama House'. A party under 2/Lt Thomas promptly worked its way behind the pillbox and threw in a bomb, the fleeing defenders being cut down by Lewis gun fire, so that the left company took its first objective by 06.20 and pushed on. The right company's commander and another officer became casualties soon after Zero but the company reached its objective even though it had lost touch with the centre company having followed 16th Cheshires, who had gone too far to their right. The support company was in position behind the leading companies by 06.15, ready to continue the attack. Moving on the left company was again held up, but Capt Russell crept up with a small party and then charged, surprising the garrison of the strongpoint, who fled. The rest of the company came up and were on the second objective by 07.20. The other two leading companies lost direction in the wood and became mixed up with 16th Cheshires but there was little opposition in front except from one pillbox whose garrison was captured. The right company was held up by a pillbox on their flank, but both the right and centre companies were on their second objective by 07.45, though the line was weak. The support company came up and assisted in consolidating the line between Panama House and 'Columbo House'; one platoon lost 18 men killed by a single shell but continued its carrying duties before reinforcing the front line. A company of 15th Sherwood Foresters came up from reserve during the morning to support the line. Captain Russell in command of the front line found that 16th Cheshires were some 200 yards (180 m) away to the right and 200 yards behind his line, with enemy snipers operating in the gap. Russell asked the Foresters to fill the gap, which they did after struggling through the tangled woods. The French 201st Regiment came up in line to the left. During the afternoon 14th Glosters' Battalion HQ and Aid Post came under accurate shellfire directed by an observation aircraft, and the Germans laid a barrage just behind the old front line, which hindered carrying parties and runners. About 16.45 the Germans counter-attacked: the attack against 14th Glosters was caught by the British protective barrage and broken up, but 16th Cheshires were driven further back. Lieutenant-Col Foord gave Capt Russell permission to echelon back his right flank to reduce the dangerous angle, with another platoon of Foresters extending the line. By the end of the day 105th Bde had stabilised its front, but only 14th Glosters was on its objective, and 104th Bde had fared far worse. 14th Glosters was relieved by 15th Cheshires that night. Its casualties are unknown, but 75 died, their names being recorded on the Tyne Cot Memorial to the Missing.

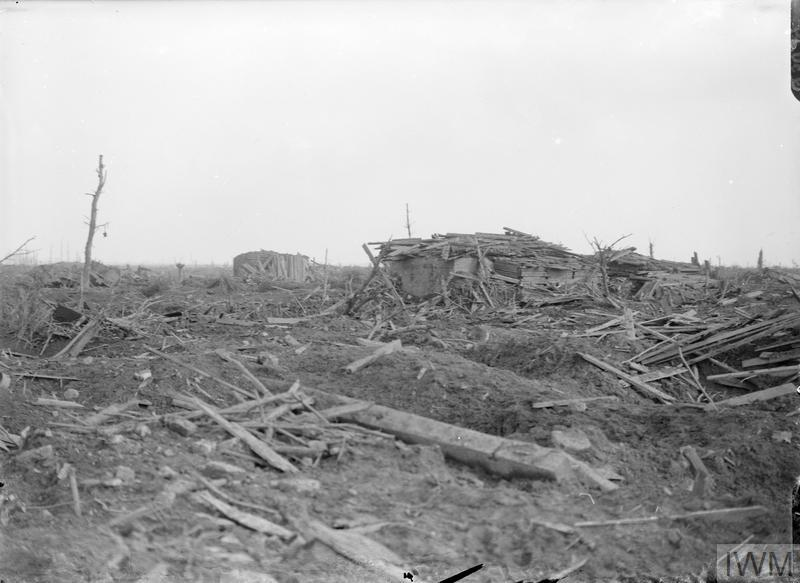
The ruins of Poelcapelle, 1917.

14th Glosters went by train back to Elverdinge and went into Larrey Camp to clean up and refit. The camp was under intermittent shellfire and casualties were sustained; the battalion piled sandbags round the huts for protection, and built duckboard tracks across the mud of the camp. On the night of 29/30 October the battalion went back into Houthulst Forest, where the area round Panama House was regularly shelled. Patrols were unable to get forward through the mud to contact the enemy. The battalion was relieved after just two days in these conditions. The battalion's medical officer carried out inspections for trench foot when the men got back to Dyke Camp. The battalion entrained for Proven on 5 November, where it trained first at Penton Camp, then at Petworth Camp and finally at Fox Camp near Ondank. 35th Division went back into the line in the Poelcappelle sector and on 24 November two companies of 14th Glosters moved up to 'Canal Bank' and provided working parties for the REs, while two went to 'Kempton Park' camp and worked for the Royal Artillery. When it went into the front line at Poelcappelle on 6 December, the trenches were dry and the line was quiet, but the cold weather meant that units had to be relieved after short spells. The battalion began rotating between Poelcappelle and 'Siege Camp', and then from 15 December was training at 'School Camp'.

On 2 January 1918 14th Glosters moved to 'Murat Camp', supplying working parties for the REs and the divisional pioneer battalion, 19th Northumberland Fusiliers. It went back into the front line near the Canal Bank from 16 to 24 January, under fire from the fortified farms in front. The battalion reported the ground conditions to be 'still impossible', but its patrols did succeed in contacting the enemy. It went into the line near Langemarck on 1 February and on the evening of 4 February Z Company carried out a raid against 'Gravel Farm'. This consisted of three ruined buildings at a road junction, about 120 yards (110 m) in front of the British outposts. Strongly garrisoned, this post hindered British patrols and acted as a base for hostile patrols. Because of its strength, the raiders were provided with more artillery support than usual, howitzers engaging all known strongpoints in the area while the divisional field guns laid down a barrage on the approaches to the target; guns from 32nd Division also joined in. The two raiding parties, supported by battalion bombers carrying bangalore torpedoes to cut the wire, moved out from 'Taube Farm' and worked their way along the Watervleitbeek stream until they were 200 yards (180 m) from Gravel Farm, where they waited for Zero at 19.00. With men slipping in the mud and darkness the raiders were detected and the defenders opened fire with machine guns, but before many casualties were suffered the barrage came down. The raiders crossed the wire ad reached the objective without further losses. They found the position to consist of concrete-reinforced ruins and a cellar, rather than pillboxes proper. The raiders killed and wounded all the defenders, and caused destruction with bombs and bangalores. They withdrew after half an hour when the barrage ceased. The raiders' casualties were 4 ORs wounded; another two men were wounded in the line by the German retaliatory barrage. 14th Glosters received congratulations from both the brigade and corps commanders for this well-prepared and executed operation.

== Disbandment ==
The raid on Gravel Farm was 14th Glosters' last operation. During 1917 the battalion had suffered casualties of 5 officers and 108 ORs killed, 18 officers and 298 ORs wounded, and 1 officer and 33 ORs missing. By early 1918 the BEF was suffering a manpower crisis. It was forced to reduce brigades from four to three battalions, and the surplus war-formed battalions were broken up to provide reinforcements for others. One of those selected was the 14th Glosters, which was disbanded on 11 February 1918. Twelve officers and 250 ORs were posted to 13th (Service) Battalion, Gloucestershire Regiment (Forest of Dean Pioneers), in 39th Division. This division suffered further heavy casualties in the German Spring Offensive of March 1918 and the 13th Bn was reduced to a training cadre for the rest of the war. The remainder of 14th Glosters marched to II Corps' Reinforcement Camp, where they became part of 12th Entrenching Battalion alongside the other former Bantam battalions of 35th Division that had been disbanded at the same time. 12th Entrenching Bn was commanded by the battalion HQ of 23rd Manchesters. The Entrenching battalions were to be used for constructing defences behind the front line, but 12th Entrenching Bn became heavily engaged during the German spring offensive. Afterwards the survivors were absorbed into the 7th Royal West Kents.

Lieutenant-Col Foord took over 19th Northumberland Fusiliers (Pioneers) and was later awarded an 'immediate' Bar to his DSO while in command of them.

During its service 14th Glosters had lost 11 officers, 50 NCOs and 328 privates killed or died of wounds or disease.
