= Hardy Falconer Parsons =

English recipient of the Victoria Cross

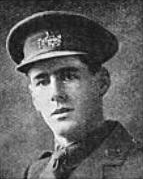
- Born: 13 June 1897; Rishton, Lancashire, England
- Died: 21 August 1917 (aged 20) near Epehy, France
- Burial place: Villers-Faucon Communal Cemetery
- Military career
- Allegiance: United Kingdom
- Branch: British Army
- Rank: Second Lieutenant
- Units: The Gloucestershire Regiment
- Conflicts: World War I †
- Awards: Victoria Cross

Hardy Falconer Parsons VC (13 June 1897 – 21 August 1917) was an English recipient of the Victoria Cross, the highest and most prestigious award for gallantry in the face of the enemy that can be awarded to British and Commonwealth forces.

He was born in Rishton, Lancashire, the son of the Reverend James Ash Parsons and Henrietta Parsons, of Leysian Mission, City Road, London. He was educated at King Edward VII School, Lytham St Annes, Kingswood School, Bath, and as a medical student at the University of Bristol, preparing for medical missionary work.

A commemorative stone was unveiled in his hometown of Rishton on 21 August 2017 at the town's war memorial to mark 100 years since he died. As he was a Bristol University medical student, a blue plaque on his former residence was also unveiled in 2017.

== Details ==
He was 20 years old, and a temporary second lieutenant in the 14th (Service) Battalion, Gloucestershire Regiment (West of England), of the British Army during the First World War when the following deed took place for which he was awarded the VC.

On 20/21 August 1917 near Epehy, France, during a night attack by the enemy on his bombing post, the bombers holding the post were forced back, but Second Lieutenant Parsons remained at his post. Single-handed and although severely burnt by liquid fire, he continued to hold up the enemy with bombs until severely wounded. Second Lieutenant Parsons died of his wounds.

He was buried at Villers-Faucon Communal Cemetery, France.

== Citation ==
An extract from The London Gazette, dated 17 October 1917, records the following:

For most conspicuous bravery during a night attack by a strong party of the enemy on a bombing post held by his command. The bombers holding the block were forced back, but Second Lieutenant Parsons remained at his post, and, single-handed, and although severely scorched and burnt by liquid fire, he continued to hold up the enemy with bombs until severely wounded. This very gallant act of self-sacrifice and devotion to duty undoubtedly delayed the enemy long enough to allow of the organisation of a bombing party, which succeeded in driving back the enemy before they could enter any portion of the trenches. The gallant officer succumbed to his wounds.

The Story of Hardy Falconer Parsons was produced by Maverick Productions in 2021, an audio documentary detailing the life of Hardy Falconer Parsons and his family. It was put together as part of a series documenting historical events in the borough of Hyndburn and is available online.

== The medal ==
His Victoria Cross is displayed in the Officers' Mess of Bristol University Officer Training Corps at the Artillery Grounds, Whiteladies Road, Bristol. The mess is named the Falconer Parsons VC Mess in his honour. His Victoria Cross was being displayed in the Imperial War Museum at Gloucester Queys after it was donated.

== Bibliography ==
- Snelling, Stephen (2012) [1998]. Passchendaele 1917. VCs of the First World War. The History Press. ISBN 978-0752476667.
