= Ludwig von Schröder =

German admiral (1854–1933)

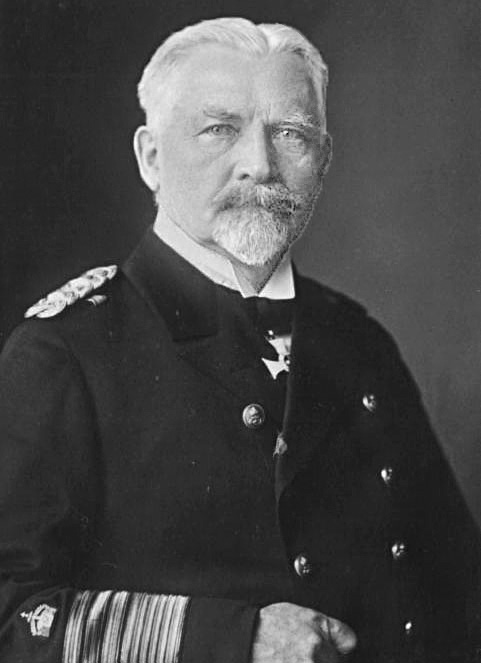
- Ludwig von Schröder
- Born: 17 July 1854; Hintzenkamp near Eggesin, Kingdom of Prussia
- Died: 23 July 1933 (aged 79); Berlin-Halensee, Nazi Germany
- Burial place: Invalidenfriedhof Berlin
- Relatives: Ludwig von Schröder (son)
- Military career
- Allegiance: German Empire
- Branch: Imperial German Navy
- Service years: 1871–1918
- Rank: Admiral
- Nickname: Lion of Flanders
- Commands: Baltic Sea Naval Command; Marinekorps Flandern
- Conflicts: World War I
- Awards: Pour le Mérite with oak leaves

Ludwig von Schröder (17 July 1854 – 23 July 1933) was a German career naval officer in the Imperial German Navy who served as an admiral during the First World War. He was highly decorated, being awarded the Pour le Mérite with oak leaves and many other awards.

== Biography ==
Schröder was born in 1854 at Hintzenkamp near Eggesin, and entered the new Imperial Naval Service in May 1871 as a cadet after passing his examinations. He was assigned for eight months to the sail training ship SMS Niobe before being posted to the Naval School at Kiel. After graduation, he was initially assigned as a subaltern to the naval infantry, followed by service on several ships, then as commanding officer of the aviso SMS Blitz, the training vessel SMS Moltke and the cruiser SMS Vineta. With his promotion to admiral in January 1911, he functioned as chief of the Cruiser Division of the West Indies Station. In February 1912, Schröder was elevated to the hereditary Prussian nobility by Kaiser Wilhelm II. Schröder retired from active duty in 1913. One of his final assignments was as the commander of the Baltic Sea Naval Command.

With the outbreak of war in August 1914, Schröder was recalled to active service and named commanding admiral in Flanders, placed in charge the Flanders U-boat flotilla and the 1st Marine Division. By mid-November 1914, additional naval infantry formations were raised and added to his command to form Marinekorps Flandern. He was in command during the 1916 Battle of Dover Strait, the successful German attack on the Dover Barrage. Schröder's leadership earned him the sobriquet "Lion of Flanders" in Germany.

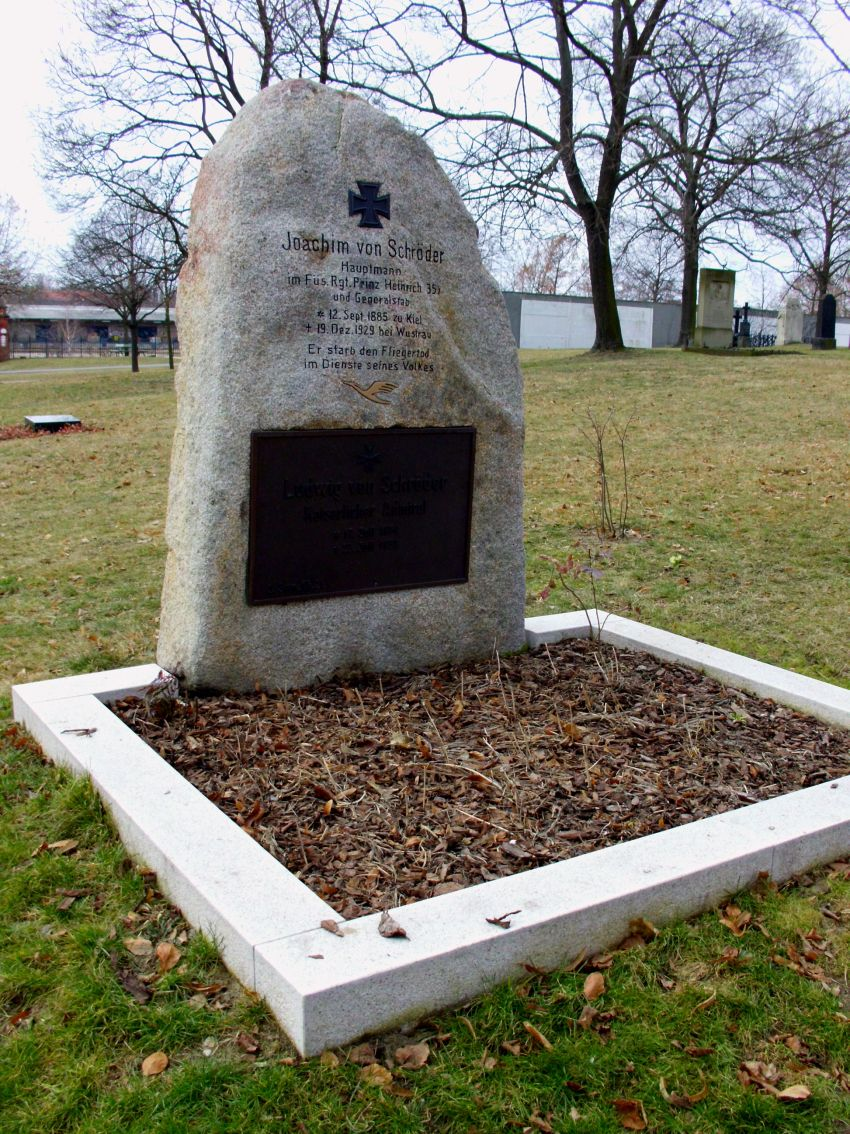
Grave of Ludwig and Joachim von Schröder (in 2013) at the Invalidenfriedhof, Berlin

After transfer to the Baltic near the end of the war, Schröder was ordered by Wilhelm II to take action against navy mutineers at Kiel. The government of Reichskanzler Max von Baden was opposed to these measures and the orders were thus not carried out. Schröder retired a second time on 12 December 1918. He died in Berlin-Halensee on 23 July 1933, age 79, and was buried at the Invalidenfriedhof cemetery in Berlin, with son Joachim (1885-1929) who preceded him in death.

Schröder's son Ludwig Karl (1884–1941) was a Luftwaffe general during the Second World War.

== Awards and decorations ==
- Order of the Red Eagle 1st class with oak leaves
- Order of the Crown of Prussia 1st class
- Pour le Mérite with oak leaves
- Iron Cross 1st and 2nd class
- Service Award Cross of Prussia
- Honour Cross First Class of the Princely House Order of Hohenzollern
- Bavarian Military Merit Order 1st class with swords
- Grand Cross of the Albert Order with golden star and swords
- Grand Gross of the Order of the Württemberg Crown
- Military Merit Cross of Mecklenburg-Schwerin 2nd class
- General Honor Decoration for bravery of Hesse
- Grand Cross of the Saxe-Ernestine House Order with swords
- Cross for Merit in War of Saxe-Meiningen
- War Merit Cross of Brunswick
- Schaumburg-Lippe Cross for Loyal Service
- Hanseatic Cross of Hamburg
- Hanseatic Cross of Bremen
- Hanseatic Cross of Lübeck

== Sources ==
- Hildebrand, Karl-Friedrich; Zweng, Christian (2011). Die Ritter des Ordens Pour le Mérite des I. Weltkriegs [The Knights of the Order Pour le Mérite of World War I]. Vol. Band 3: P–Z. Bissendorf: Biblio Verlag. pp. 451–453. ISBN 978-3-7648-2586-7.
- Karau, Mark (2003). "Wielding the Dagger": The MarineKorps Flandern and the German War Effort 1914–1918. Contributions in Military Studies. Vol. 226. Westport, Connecticut: Preager. ISBN 0-313-32475-1.
- Möller-Witten, Hanns (1935). Geschichte der Ritter des "Ordens pour le mérite" im Weltkrieg [History of the Knights of the "Order pour le mérite" during the World War]. Vol. Band II: M–Z. Berlin: Verlag Bernard & Graefe. pp. 442–444. OCLC 11108719.
