= 85th Landwehr Division =

85th Landwehr Division (85. Landwehr-Division)
- Active: 1914-1919
- Country: German Empire
- Branch: Army
- Type: Infantry
- Size: Approx. 12,500
- Engagements: World War I: Gorlice-Tarnów Offensive

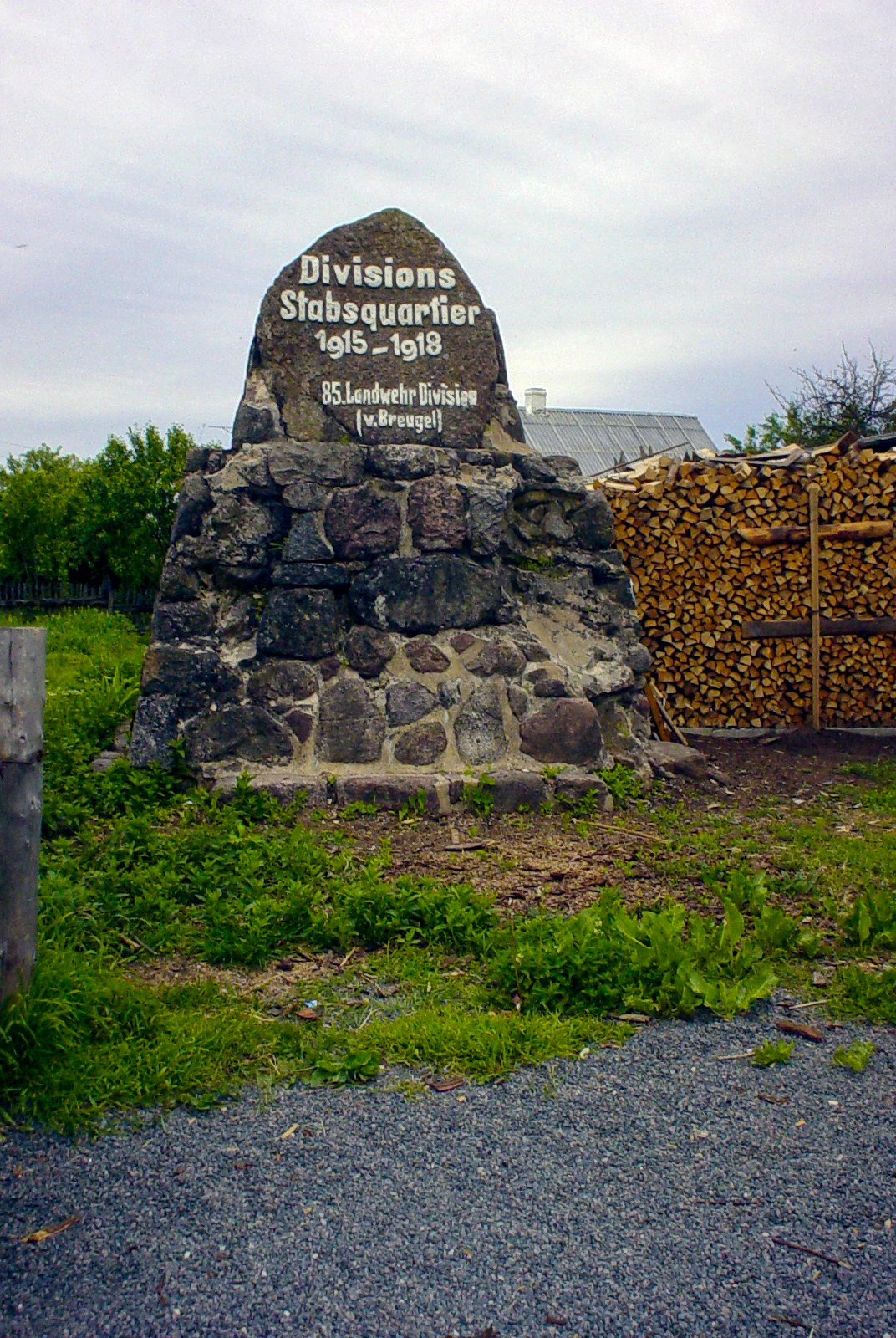
Memorial Stone Divisions Staff Quarter of the 85th Landwehr Division, Juraciški, Belarus.

The 85th Landwehr Division (85. Landwehr-Division) was a unit of the Imperial German Army in World War I. The division was formed in November 1914 as the Breugel Division (Division Breugel), named after its commander, Generalleutnant Willem Hendrick Clifford Kocq von Breugel, and became the 85th Landwehr Division on 13 September 1915. The division was disbanded in 1919 during the demobilization of the German Army after World War I. The Landwehr was the third category of the German Army, after the regular Army and the reserves. Thus Landwehr divisions were generally made up of older soldiers who had passed from the reserves, and were intended primarily for occupation and security duties rather than heavy combat.

== Combat chronicle ==
The 85th Landwehr Division served on the Eastern Front. It occupied the line by Mława from November 1914 to July 1915 and then participated in the Gorlice-Tarnów Offensive, breaking through at Przasnysz and fighting on the Narew, and then participating in follow-on fighting for the next several months. In September 1915, it was in the Lithuanian swamps. It was engaged in positional warfare in the Vishnev sector on the Berezina, Olshanka and Krevljanka Rivers from September 1915 to October 1917. It moved with the line northwards in a series of fights until the armistice on the Eastern Front. The division fought in Estonia in February/March 1918, and then served as occupation troops in Estonia and Russia until the end of World War I in November 1918. Elements of the division were being transferred to Belgium at the time of the Armistice on the Western Front, and other elements remained in Lithuania and White Russia as security forces for several months after the end of World War I, finally departing in February 1919. Allied intelligence rated the division as fourth class.

== Order of battle on formation ==
The 85th Landwehr Division was formed as a square division. The order of battle of the division on 7 July 1915 was as follows:

- 169. Landwehr-Infanterie-Brigade
  - Landwehr-Infanterie-Regiment Nr. 61
  - Landwehr-Infanterie-Regiment Nr. 99
- 170. Landwehr-Infanterie-Brigade
  - Landwehr-Infanterie-Regiment Nr. 17
  - Landwehr-Infanterie-Regiment Nr. 21
- 1. mobil Ersatz-Eskadron/XVII. Armeekorps
- 2. mobil Ersatz-Eskadron/XVII. Armeekorps
- mobil Ersatz-Eskadron/Grenadier-zu-Pferd-Regiment Freiherr von Derfflinger (Neumärkisches) Nr. 3
- Feldartillerie-Regiment Nr. 85
- II.Bataillon/2. Pommersches Fußartillerie-Regiment Nr. 15
- 1. Reserve-Kompanie/Pionier-Bataillon Nr. 26
- 2. Kompanie/Pionier-Bataillon Nr. 26

== Late-war order of battle ==
The division underwent a number of organizational changes over the course of the war. It was triangularized in March 1917, losing the 170th Landwehr Infantry Brigade headquarters and the 61st Landwehr Infantry Regiment. Cavalry was reduced, artillery and signals commands were formed, and combat engineer support was expanded to a full pioneer battalion. The order of battle on 13 January 1918 was as follows:

- 169. Landwehr-Infanterie-Brigade
  - Landwehr-Infanterie-Regiment Nr. 17
  - Landwehr-Infanterie-Regiment Nr. 21
  - Landwehr-Infanterie-Regiment Nr. 99
  - Radfahrer-Kompanie Nr. 85
- 5. Eskadron/Kürassier-Regiment (Brandenburgisches) Nr. 6
- Artillerie-Kommandeur 85
  - Feldartillerie-Regiment Nr. 275
- Stab Pionier-Bataillon Nr. 485
  - Minenwerfer-Kompanie Nr. 385
- Divisions-Nachrichten-Kommandeur 585
