= 3rd Division (German Empire) =

3rd Division (3. Division); in 1870-71 and from August 2, 1914, 3rd Infantry Division (3. Infanterie-Division)
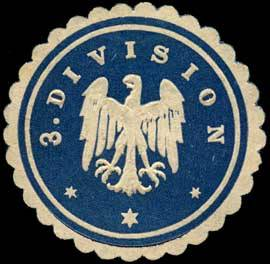
- Sealing Stamp of the 3rd Division
- Active: 5 September 1818–1919
- Country: Prussia/German Empire
- Branch: Imperial German Army
- Type: Infantry (in peacetime included cavalry)
- Size: Approx. 15,000 men
- Part of: II. Army Corps (II. Armeekorps)
- Garrison/HQ: Stettin
- Engagements: Austro-Prussian War: Battle of Königgrätz; Franco-Prussian War: Battle of Gravelotte; Siege of Metz; Siege of Paris; World War I: First Battle of the Marne; Race to the Sea; Eastern Front

Commanders
- Notable commanders: Prince Frederick Charles of Prussia, August Graf von Werder, Georg von der Marwitz

The 3rd Division (3. Division) was a unit of the Prussian/German Army. It was formed in Stettin (now Szczecin, Poland) in May 1816 as a Troop Brigade (Truppen-Brigade). It became the 3rd Division on September 5, 1818. From the corps' formation in 1820, the division was subordinated in peacetime to the II Army Corps (II. Armeekorps). The 3rd Division was disbanded in 1919 during the demobilization of the German Army after World War I.

The 3rd Division and its regiments fought in the Austro-Prussian War against Austria in 1866, distinguishing itself at the Battle of Königgrätz. The division then fought in the Franco-Prussian War against France in 1870-71. It saw action in the Battle of Gravelotte, the siege of Metz, and the siege of Paris, among other actions.

In World War I, the 3rd Division served initially on the Western Front, seeing action in the invasion of Belgium, the First Battle of the Marne and the Race to the Sea. The division was then transferred to the Eastern Front, and remained there until the end of the war with Russia. It then served in occupation duty in Russia until October 1918, when it returned to the Western Front for the final few weeks of the war.

== 1870 organization ==
During wartime, the 3rd Division, like other regular German divisions, was redesignated an infantry division. The organization of the 3rd Infantry Division in 1870 at the beginning of the Franco-Prussian War was as follows:

- 5th Infantry Brigade (5. Infanterie-Brigade)
  - 2nd Grenadier Regiment "King Friedrich Wilhelm IV" (1st Pomeranian) (Grenadier-Regiment König Friedrich Wilhelm IV (1. Pomm.) Nr. 2)
  - 42nd Infantry Regiment (5th Pomeranian) (5. Pommersches Infanterie-Regiment Nr. 42)
- 6th Infantry Brigade (5. Infanterie-Brigade)
  - 14th Infantry Regiment (3rd Pomeranian) (3. Pommersches Infanterie-Regiment Nr. 14)
  - 54th Infantry Regiment (7th Pomeranian) (7. Pommersches Infanterie-Regiment Nr. 54)
- 2nd Jäger Battalion (Jäger Bataillon Nr. 2)
- 3rd Dragoon Regiment (Dragoner-Regiment Nr. 3)

== Pre-World War I organization ==
Many regiments were renamed and assigned to different divisions during the period from 1871 to 1914. Among other changes, the 3rd and 4th Divisions swapped the Colberg Grenadiers and the 14th Infantry Regiment. In 1914, the peacetime organization of the 3rd Division was as follows:

- 5th Infantry Brigade (5. Infanterie-Brigade)
  - 2nd Grenadier Regiment "King Friedrich Wilhelm IV" (1st Pomeranian) (Grenadier-Regiment König Friedrich Wilhelm IV (1. Pomm.) Nr. 2)
  - 9th Colberg Grenadier Regiment "Graf Gneisenau" (2nd Pomeranian) (Colbergsches Grenadier-Regiment Graf Gneisenau (2. Pomm.) Nr. 9)
  - 54th Infantry Regiment "von der Goltz" (7th Pomeranian) (Infanterie-Regiment von der Goltz (7. Pomm.) Nr. 54)
- 6th Infantry Brigade (5. Infanterie-Brigade)
  - 34th Fusilier Regiment "Queen Victoria of Sweden" (Pomeranian) (Füsilier-Regiment Königin Viktoria von Schweden (Pomm.) Nr. 34)
  - 42nd Infantry Regiment "Prince Moritz of Anhalt-Dessau" (5th Pomeranian) (Infanterie-Regiment Prinz Moritz von Anhalt-Dessau (5. Pomm.) Nr. 42)
- 3rd Cavalry Brigade (3. Kavallerie-Brigade)
  - 2nd Cuirassier Regiment "Queen" (Pomeranian) (Kürassier-Regiment Königin (Pomm.) Nr. 2)
  - 9th Uhlan Regiment (2nd Pomeranian) (2. Pommersches Ulanen-Regiment Nr. 9)
- 3rd Field Artillery Brigade (3. Feldartillerie-Brigade)
  - 2nd Field Artillery Regiment (1. Pommersches Feldartillerie-Regiment Nr. 2)
  - 38th Hither Pomeranian Field Artillery Regiment (Vorpommersches Feldartillerie-Regiment Nr. 38)

== August 1914 organization ==
On mobilization in August 1914 at the beginning of World War I, most divisional cavalry, including brigade headquarters, was withdrawn to form cavalry divisions or split up among divisions as reconnaissance units. Divisions received engineer companies and other support units from their higher headquarters. The 3rd Division was again renamed the 3rd Infantry Division and the 54th Infantry was transferred to the 36th Reserve Division. The 3rd Infantry Division's initial wartime organization was as follows:

- 5.Infanterie-Brigade:
  - Grenadier-Regiment König Friedrich Wilhelm IV (1. Pommersches) Nr. 2
  - Colbergsches-Grenadier-Regiment Graf Gneisenau (2. Pommersches) Nr. 9
- 6.Infanterie-Brigade:
  - Füsilier-Regiment Königin Viktoria von Schweden (1. Pommersches) Nr. 34
  - Infanterie-Regiment Prinz Moritz von Anhalt-Dessau (5. Pommersches) Nr. 42
- Grenadier-Regiment zu Pferde Freiherr von Derfflinger (Neumärkisches) Nr. 3
- 3.Feldartillerie-Brigade:
  - 1. Pommersches Feldartillerie-Regiment Nr. 2
  - Vorpommersches Feldartillerie-Regiment Nr. 38
- 1./Pommersches Pionier-Bataillon Nr. 2

== Late World War I organization ==
Divisions underwent many changes during the war, with regiments moving from division to division, and some being destroyed and rebuilt. During the war, most divisions became triangular - one infantry brigade with three infantry regiments rather than two infantry brigades of two regiments (a "square division"). An artillery commander replaced the artillery brigade headquarters, the cavalry was further reduced, the engineer contingent was increased, and a divisional signals command was created.

The 3rd Infantry Division was heavily reorganized by 1918, losing all of its prewar infantry regiments. These were replaced by lower grade infantry and Landwehr infantry regiments. The division was also weaker in artillery and engineers than most other divisions. These changes reflected the division's primary role as occupation troops late in the war. Its order of battle on January 10, 1918, was as follows:

- 6.Infanterie-Brigade:
  - Infanterie-Regiment Nr. 425
  - Infanterie-Regiment Nr. 428
  - Landwehr-Infanterie-Regiment Nr. 4
- 3.Eskadron/Grenadier-Regiment zu Pferde Freiherr von Derfflinger (Neumärkisches) Nr. 3
- Feldartillerie-Regiment Nr. 87
- Stab Pionier-Bataillon Nr. 112:
  - 1.Landwehr-Kompanie/Schlesisches Pionier-Bataillon Nr. 6
  - Minenwerfer-Kompanie Nr. 3
- Divisions-Nachrichten-Kommandeur 3
