= John Stanhope Collings-Wells =

British Army officer & recipient of the Victoria Cross

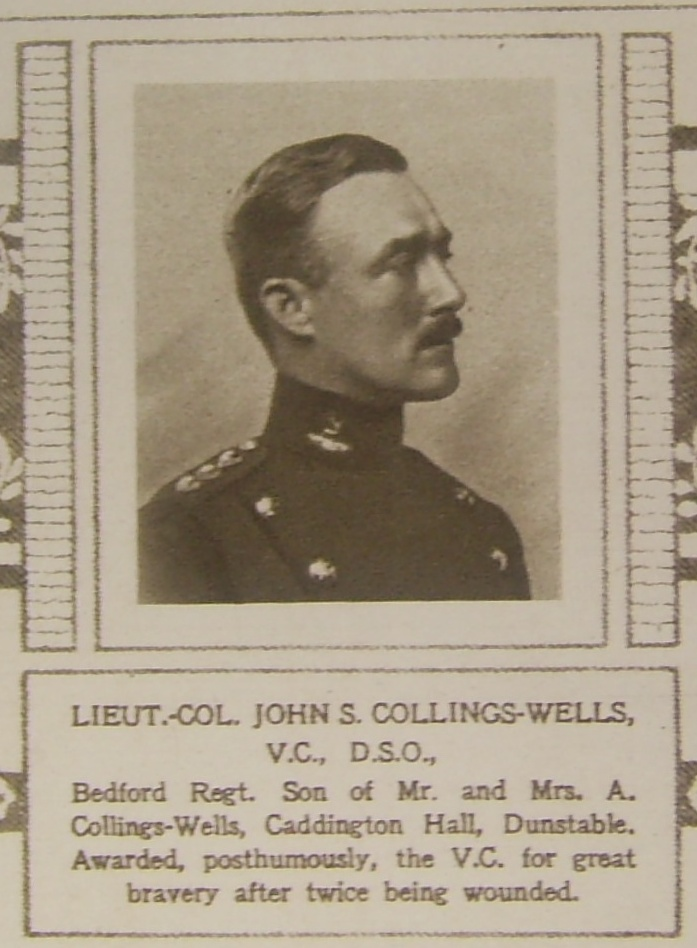
- Born: 19 July 1880; Manchester, Lancashire, England (Note: Although Gerald Gliddon claims he was born at Caddington Hall, Markyate, Hertfordshire.)
- Died: 27 March 1918 (aged 37); Albert, France
- Burial place: Bouzincourt Ridge Cemetery, Albert, France
- Military career
- Allegiance: United Kingdom
- Branch: British Army
- Service years: 1904–1918
- Rank: Lieutenant-Colonel
- Units: Bedfordshire Regiment
- Conflicts: World War I †
- Awards: Victoria Cross; Distinguished Service Order

Lieutenant-Colonel John Stanhope Collings-Wells VC DSO (19 July 1880 – 27 March 1918) was an English recipient of the Victoria Cross, the highest and most prestigious award for gallantry in the face of the enemy that can be awarded to British and Commonwealth forces. He was educated at Uppingham School and Christ Church, Oxford, where he joined the Apollo University Lodge.

Born in Manchester on 19 July 1880 to Arthur & Caroline Mary, Collings-Wells moved to Marple to live with his cousin, Will Buck, enabling him to run his father's business in Manchester.

Collings-Wells was commissioned into the 4th (Hertfordshire Militia) Battalion, Bedfordshire Regiment on 17 September 1904 and promoted to captain on 3 January 1907. The part-time Militia was converted into the Special Reserve in 1908, with the role of providing reinforcements for the Regular Army in time of war.

After World War I war broke out in 1914, Collings-Wells went to France as a reinforcement for the 2nd (Regular) Battalion of the Bedfords on 6 November 1914. He was wounded on 12 January 1915 and evacuated to the UK. He was promoted to temporary major on 30 January 1916 and was serving as commander of A Company in 4th (Extra Reserve) Battalion, Bedfordshire Regiment when it landed in France in July 1916. Collings-Wells became second-in-command of the battalion on 4 September and took over command of the battalion as acting Lieutenant-Colonel on 20 October 1916.

Collings-Wells was awarded the Distinguished Service Order in 1917 for his command of the battalion during the Second Battle of the Scarpe, when it captured and held the northern outskirts of Gavrelle on 23 April 1917. Further, on 29 April he commanded a composite battalion of 4th Bedfords and 7th (Extra Reserve) Battalion, Royal Fusiliers in the Battle of Arleux when it attacked and captured the Oppy line. He was also mentioned in dispatches in November 1917.

== VC citation ==
Collings-Wells was 37 years old and a Lieutenant Colonel in the period 22/27 March 1918 during the fighting from Marcoing to Albert, France, while commanding 4th Bedfords he committed acts which earned him the Victoria Cross (VC). He died in action on 27 March 1918.

For most conspicuous bravery, skilful leading and handling of his battalion in very critical situations during a withdrawal.

When the rear guard was almost surrounded and in great danger of being captured, Lieutenant-Colonel Collings-Wells, realising the situation, called for volunteers to remain behind and hold up the enemy whilst the remainder of the rearguard withdrew and, with his small body of volunteers held them up for over one and a half hours until they had expended every round of ammunition. During this time he moved freely amongst his men, guiding them and encouraging them and, by his great courage, undoubtedly saved the situation.

On a subsequent occasion, when his battalion was ordered to carry out a counter -attack, he showed the greatest bravery. Knowing that his men were extremely tired after six days fighting, he placed himself in front and led the attack and, even when twice wounded, refused to leave them, but continued to lead and encourage his men until he was killed at the moment of gaining their objective. The successful results of the operation were, without doubt, due to the undaunted courage exhibited by this officer.

— London Gazette, 24 April 1918

He was buried at Bouzincourt Ridge Cemetery (Plot 3, Row E, Grave 12). His VC is displayed at the Bedfordshire and Hertfordshire Regimental Collection at the Wardown Park Museum, Luton, Bedfordshire.

== Bibliography ==
- Gliddon, Gerald (2013) [2004]. Spring Offensive 1918. VCs of the First World War. The History Press. ISBN 978-0-7524-8730-4.
