= Selton Hill ambush =

RIC ambush during the Irish War of Independence

- Part of the Irish War of Independence
Date	11 March 1921
Location	between Mohill and Fenagh, County Leitrim 53.990°N 7.852°W
Result	British victory

Belligerents
(United Kingdom of Great Britain and Ireland) Royal Irish Constabulary (Auxiliary Division) (United Kingdom of Great Britain and Ireland) British Army (Bedfordshire and Hertfordshire Regiment)	(Irish Republic) Irish Republican Army (Leitrim Brigade)

Commanders and leaders
(United Kingdom of Great Britain and Ireland) Thomas Gore-Hickman (RIC)	(Irish Republic) Seán Connolly (IRA)

Strength
Unknown	Unknown

Casualties and losses
None	6 killed
- 1 informer later executed by IRA
- Location within island of Ireland

The Selton Hill ambush took place on 11 March 1921, during the Irish War of Independence. An Irish Republican Army (IRA) flying column was ambushed by members of the RIC Auxiliary Division at Selton Hill (a.k.a. Seltan Hill), County Leitrim. Six IRA members of the South Leitrim Brigade were killed, which effectively destroyed the IRA in South Leitrim.

== Background ==
Seán Connolly was an IRA activist from County Longford, but he was also used by IRA GHQ to organise surrounding areas; first County Roscommon and then County Leitrim. When Michael Collins ordered Connolly into the county, he warned that it was "the most treacherous county in Ireland". As Connolly was running a training camp at Selton Hill in early 1921, his position was given to the RIC. The RIC District Inspector, Thomas Gore-Hickman, had been alerted to Connolly's position by a local doctor who had served in the British Army. The doctor had reportedly been told of the training camp by a local farmer who was a member of the Orange Order.

== Ambush ==
The events at Selton Hill took place one week after the Sheemore ambush, in which British troops from the Bedfordshire & Hertfordshire Regiment, based in Boyle, suffered several casualties and at least one fatality. At Selton Hill, a large force of RIC and Auxiliaires based in Mohill, as well as troops from the Bedfordshire & Hertfordshire Regiment, surrounded and then attacked the IRA camp on 11 March. Six IRA volunteers were killed. The RIC suffered no losses. The IRA dead were Sean Connolly, Seamus Wrynne, Joseph O'Beirne (or Beirne), John Reilly, Joseph Reilly, and Capt ME Baxter.

Ernie O'Malley later stated that the volunteers' bodies were "taken to Mohill by soldiers who shouted 'fresh meat!' as they were driving through the town". O'Malley was quoted as saying "Men from the Bedfordshire Regiment were seen by a badly wounded IRA officer, Bernie Sweeney who survived, to use rifle butts on the skulls of two wounded men". He also stated that the location of the column was given to the local D/I of the RIC by a doctor who had been in the British Army, who received the information from a local Orangeman. The IRA officer who survived was Bernie Sweeney, from Ballinamore, who survived by hiding in a drain, where the cold water prevented him bleeding to death. He was rescued and hidden from the Black and Tans and Auxiliaries by locals.

== Aftermath ==
The IRA learned their position had been given away by the doctor and the Orangeman. The latter, a farmer named William Latimer, was later killed by the IRA on 30 March 1921. The doctor escaped to England and later died in an accident.

The border country of the north midlands often proved to be a treacherous place for IRA training camps. On 8 May 1921 another camp (of Belfast IRA volunteers) based in the Lappanduff hills in neighbouring County Cavan, was also surprised – one volunteer was killed, thirteen captured, and much arms and ammunition seized by the British forces.

== See also ==
- Timeline of the Irish War of Independence
