= 190th Brigade (United Kingdom) =

Military unit

The 190th Brigade was a brigade of the British Army during the First World War. It was formed in France in 1916, and assigned to the 63rd (Royal Naval) Division and served on the Western Front.

== Formation ==
The infantry battalions did not all serve at once, but all were assigned to the brigade during the war.

- 7th (Extra Reserve) Battalion, Royal Fusiliers (SR)
- 4th (Extra Reserve) Battalion, Bedfordshire Regiment (SR)
- 1/1st Battalion, Honourable Artillery Company (TF)
- 10th Battalion, Royal Dublin Fusiliers
- 1/28th Battalion, London Regiment (Artists Rifles) (TF)
- 1/4th Battalion, King's Shropshire Light Infantry (TF)
- 190th Machine Gun Company
- 190th Trench Mortar Battery

== Commanders ==
- Brigadier-General Charles Trotman (9 July – 13 September 1916)
- Acting – Lieutenant-Colonel Rawdon Hesketh (13 September – 15 September 1916)
- Acting – Lieutenant-Colonel Alexander Hutchison (15 September – 2 October 1916)
- Brigadier-General Charles Trotman (2 October – 5 October 1916)
- Acting – Lieutenant-Colonel Rawdon Hesketh (5 October – 6 October 1916)
- Acting – Lieutenant-Colonel Alexander Hutchison (6 October – 17 October 1916)
- Brigadier-General Charles Trotman (17 October – 24 October 1916)
- Brigadier-General Charles Sackville-West (24 October – 29 October 1916)
- Brigadier-General William Heneker (29 October – 8 December 1916)
- Acting – Lieutenant-Colonel Ernest Boyle (8 December – 12 December 1916)
- Acting – Lieutenant-Colonel Rawdon Hesketh (12 December – 18 December 1916)
- Brigadier-General H. W. E. Finch (18 December 1916 – 4 June 1917)
- Acting – Lieutenant-Colonel John Collings-Wells (4 June – 10 June 1917)
- Acting – Lieutenant-Colonel Lord Seymour (10 June – 18 June 1917)
- Acting – Lieutenant-Colonel John Collings-Wells (18 June – 20 June 1917)
- Brigadier-General Alexander Hutchison (20 June 1917 – 6 June 1918)
- Brigadier-General William Lesslie (6 June 1918 – disbandment)
