= Hertfordshire Militia =

Auxiliary unit of the British Army

Hertfordshire Trained Bands Hertfordshire Militia 4th Battalion, Bedfordshire Regiment
- Active: 1572–1 April 1953
- Country: Kingdom of England (1558–1707); Kingdom of Great Britain (1707–1800); United Kingdom (1801–1953)
- Branch: Militia
- Role: Infantry
- Size: 1–3 Regiments
- Garrison/HQ: Hertford Militia Barracks
- Nickname: 'Hartfordshire Militia'
- Mascot: A hart
- Engagements: English Civil War; Second Boer War; World War I; Battle of the Ancre (1916); Second Battle of the Scarpe; Battle of Arleux; Second Battle of Passchendaele; German Spring Offensive; Battle of the Ancre (1918); Battle of Albert; Thilloy; Battle of the Canal du Nord; Second Battle of Cambrai

Commanders
- Notable commanders: James Cecil, 1st Marquess of Salisbury; James Gascoyne-Cecil, 4th Marquess of Salisbury; Lt-Col John Stanhope Collings-Wells, VC

The Hertfordshire Militia was an auxiliary (Note: It is incorrect to describe the British Militia as 'irregular': throughout their history they were equipped and trained exactly like the line regiments of the regular army, and once embodied in time of war they were fulltime professional soldiers for the duration of their enlistment.) military force in Hertfordshire in South East England. From their formal organisation as Trained Bands in 1558 and their service in the English Civil War, the Militia of Hertfordshire served during times of international tension and all of Britain's major wars. They provided internal security and home defence but sometimes operated further afield, including Ireland, relieving regular troops from routine garrison duties, and acted as a source of trained officers and men for the Regular Army. Under the Cardwell Reforms they were linked with the neighbouring Bedfordshire Regiment and went on active service during the Second Boer War. The Militia were converted into the Special Reserve under the Haldane Reforms of 1908 intended to supply reinforcements to the Regulars. However, the Hertfordshire battalion saw considerable action on the Western Front during World War I, when its commanding officer won a Victoria Cross and it led the final pursuit in the days before the Armistice. After 1921 the militia had only a shadowy existence until its final abolition in 1953.

== Early history ==
The English militia was descended from the Anglo-Saxon Fyrd, the military force raised from the freemen of the shires under command of their Sheriff. It continued under the Norman kings, notably at the Battle of the Standard (1138). The force was reorganised under the Assizes of Arms of 1181 and 1252, and again by King Edward I's Statute of Winchester of 1285. Under this statute 'Commissioners of Array' would levy the required number of men from each shire, divided into companies of 100 commanded by ductores, and subdivided into platoons of 20 led by vintenars. The custom was to requisition men for service from the shires closest to the scene of action, and Hertfordshire was too distant from the Welsh and Scottish borders for most of the campaigns under the Plantagenet kings. However Edward III called out a small contingent of Hertfordshire levies for his Scottish campaign in 1335. It comprised one ductor, two vintenars and 53 foot archers, serving from 23 June to 22 August. By now the infantry were mainly equipped with the English longbow.

This system remained in place under the early Tudors and the shire levies were occasionally mustered by Hundreds for inspection of the men and arms. Henry VIII ordered a Great Muster in 1539, when Hertford Town and Hertford Hundred mustered the following:

- Hertford: 6 mounted men in 'harness' (armour) + 80 archers and billmen
- Hertingfordbury: 34
- Bayford: 1 + 21
- Berkhamsted Parva: 12
- Essendon: 20
- Broxbourne: 2 + 25
- Amwell hamlet in Hoddesdon: 12
- Cheshunt Street: 93
- Waltham Cross: 74 (two of them 'Dutchmen')
- Wormley: 22
- Brickendon: 28
- Amwell: 32
- Stanstead Thele: 1 + 10
- Stapleford: 14
- Bengeo: 29
- Tewin: 21

== Hertfordshire Trained Bands ==
The legal basis of the militia was updated by two acts of 1557 covering musters (4 & 5 Ph. & M. c. 3) and the maintenance of horses and armour (4 & 5 Ph. & M. c. 2). The county militia was now under the lord lieutenant, assisted by the deputy lieutenants and justices of the peace (JPs). The entry into force of these Acts in 1558 is seen as the starting date for the organised county militia in England.

Hertfordshire was one of the southern counties called upon to send troops to suppress the Rising of the North in 1569. Although the militia obligation was universal, this assembly confirmed that it was clearly impractical to train and equip every able-bodied man. After 1572 the practice was to select a proportion of men for the Trained Bands (TBs), who were mustered for regular training, though Hertfordshire was short of experienced captains to train them. Although the trained bands were exempt from foreign service, they and their armouries were frequently drawn upon to supply and arm levies (usually untrained substitutes) employed overseas.

=== Armada Campaign ===
In 1584 Hertfordshire mustered its full quota of 400 'shot' (armed with calivers or arquebuses), 500 bowmen, and 100 'corslets' (armoured pikemen). The Armada Crisis in 1588 led to the mobilisation of the trained bands, when Hertfordshire furnished 1500 trained men, organised into companies under captains, and 1500 untrained men (often employed as pioneers). The Hertfordshire Trained Bands were on duty in London in 1601 to guard against disorder during the Earl of Essex's trial and subsequent execution. They were also among the trained bands camped in the London suburbs to ensure a peaceful transition on the death of Elizabeth I in 1603.

=== Bishops' Wars ===
With the passing of the threat of invasion, the trained bands declined in the early 17th Century. Later, King Charles I attempted to reform them into a national force or 'Perfect Militia' answering to the king rather than local control. By 1638 the Hertfordshire Trained Bands mustered 750 muskets and 750 pikemen, with 27 lancers and 53 light horsemen. The trained bands including the Hertfordshire contingent were called out in 1639 and 1640 for the Bishops' Wars, though many of the men who actually went were untrained hired substitutes. In March 1640 Hertfordshire was ordered to provide 650 selected men for the force to rendezvous on 20 May to sail to Newcastle upon Tyne from Harwich on 31 May. However, under the leadership of Edmund Aylee the largely Puritan Hertfordshire trained bandsmen took the opportunity to carry out acts of iconoclasm against churches in their own county, tearing down and burning communion rails, which they considered to be 'Popish'.

=== Civil War ===
Control of the trained bands was one of the major points of dispute between Charles I and Parliament that led to the English Civil War. In 1641 the moderate Earl of Salisbury of Hatfield House was named as a suitable person to command the men of Hertfordshire. Once open war broke out in 1642 neither side made much use of the trained bands beyond securing the county armouries for their own full-time troops. Hertfordshire's TBs saw more service than most. In May radicals in Hertford had begun drilling as a volunteer company; when this was banned by the King, they sought permission from Parliament which was given in July, when Watford also raised a volunteer company, and St Albans followed under the leadership of Alban Cox. Counties soon began raising auxiliary TB regiments from younger men, apprentices and servants who were not normally members of the TBs, which would serve short tours of duty as garrisons or reinforcing the field armies. The three volunteer town guard companies in Hertfordshire became the nucleus of the Orange Auxiliary Regiment (so-called from the colour of its company flags), commanded by Sir John Wittewrong, with Colonel Alban Cox commanding the regiment's horse. It was followed by the Green Regiment under Sir John Garrard, and the Black Regiment commanded by Col Adam Washington. Each regiment had at least a troop of horse, the Orange also had dragoons and light horse scouts, and the Black had two Drake field guns.

The county was included in Parliament's Eastern Association to supply troops, supplies and finance. After Parliament's army seized Newport Pagnell in Buckinghamshire on 27 October 1643, it was garrisoned by two regiments of the London Trained Bands (LTBs) and Garrard's Green Hertfordshire Auxiliaries until a permanent garrison could be recruited from the Eastern Association. The Orange Regiment garrisoned Aylesbury in Buckinghamshire, and the Black Regiment went into garrison at Uxbridge in Middlesex in December 1643.

In 1644 Parliament commissioned Colonel Richard Browne of the LTBs as Major-General of Oxfordshire, Buckinghamshire and Berkshire and gave him the task of reducing the Royalist garrisons in those counties. However, in June 1644 the King broke out of Oxford and after feinting west, moved eastwards with his force. Browne was directed towards Hertford to protect the Eastern Association counties. He reached Leighton Buzzard on 1 July with three regiments of LTBs, where he was joined by the Green and Black Hertfordshire Auxiliaries and the Essex TBs. Browne was too late to intervene in the Battle of Cropredy Bridge and when he joined the beaten Parliamentary force under Sir William Waller near Towcester on 2 July the King was already 30 miles (48 km) away. By now Waller's original LTB brigade was deserting for home, and the Essex TBs began to join them, while the Hertfordshire men complained bitterly of their poor quarters. On 6 July Browne was wounded in the face when he confronted his mutinous troops. Waller's army was dispersed, and under his original orders Browne was sent with his brigade to capture Greenland House on the River Thames near Henley. This had been garrisoned and fortified by the Royalists in December 1643 to block Parliamentary supplies travelling down the Thames. One of the Hertfordshire TB regiments commanded by Colonel Mitchell saw service at the short Siege of Greenland House. After Browne captured the place on 11 July he went to garrison Reading, Berkshire, with his three London regiments and the rest of the TBs went home, though the Green Hertfordshire Auxiliaries were serving with Browne again in early 1645.

In September 1645 the Hertfordshire Trained Band Horse, apparently numbering 500, served in a force under Col Richard Graves of the New Model Army marching from Thame towards Cheshire, but may have gone home before the Battle of Rowton Heath.

Once Parliament had established full control in 1648 it passed new Militia Acts that replaced lords lieutenant with county commissioners appointed by Parliament or the Council of State. At the same time the term 'Trained Band' began to disappear in most counties. Under the Commonwealth and Protectorate the militia received pay when called out, and operated alongside the New Model Army to control the country.

== Hertfordshire Militia ==
After the Restoration of the Monarchy, the English Militia was re-established by the Militia Act 1661 under the control of the king's lords-lieutenant, the men to be selected by ballot. This was popularly seen as the 'Constitutional Force' to counterbalance a 'Standing Army' tainted by association with the New Model Army that had supported Cromwell's military dictatorship.

The Hertfordshire Militia were called out on anti-invasion duties in 1666 during the Second Anglo-Dutch War, and on 4 September the same year 200 Hertfordshire militiamen were sent to help fight the Great Fire of London, equipped with pickaxes, ropes and buckets. For the gentry service in the militia was both an honour and a burden. For the 1666 embodiment the acting Lord Lieutenant of Hertfordshire, Viscount Fanshawe only selected those of the Hertfordshire Cavalry Militia who had voted the 'wrong' way in the previous election.

The militia returns of 1697 show that Hertfordshire had one regiment commanded by the Lord Lieutenant, the Earl of Essex, with 10 companies of foot (1025 men) and three Troops of horse (183 men) commanded by Captains Henry Gore, John Charlton and Gilbert Hookate. (Note: Some sources mistakenly give this as the date of foundation of the Hertfordshire Militia.)

The Militia passed into virtual abeyance during the long peace after the Treaty of Utrecht in 1712, although a few counties (not Hertfordshire) were called out during the Jacobite risings of 1715 and 1745.

=== Seven Years' War ===
Under threat of French invasion during the Seven Years' War a series of Militia Acts from 1757 re-established the county militia regiments, raised by conscription by means of parish ballots, or paid substitutes, to serve for three years. Hertfordshire's quota was set at 560 men in one regiment. There was considerable opposition to the militia ballot: in many places the JPs were prevented from drawing up lists of those liable to serve, and trouble broke out in Hertfordshire on 5 September. At Berkhamsted the magistrates argued with the bomb for several hours before adjourning and surrendering the lists they had made. At Hertford the meeting was undisturbed, but people threatened to tear down the magistrates' houses if they made any more. At Royston the magistrates were intimidated from meeting at all. Nevertheless, the county regiment was one of the first to achieve 60 per cent of its establishment and received its arms from the Tower of London on 5 March 1759. It was embodied for service on 11 October that year. (From 1759 to its transfer to the Special Reserve in 1908, the regiment styled itself the 'Hartfordshire Militia', reflecting the correct pronunciation (and its choice of a Hart for its cap badge) but this spelling was never officially recognised.) At first the regiment was dispersed across a number of locations and to do his rounds the regimental surgeon had to cover 36 miles (58 km). After serving in home defence for two years the regiment was disembodied in January 1763 once a peace treaty had been agreed. In peacetime, the reformed militia regiments were supposed to be assembled for 28 days' annual training.

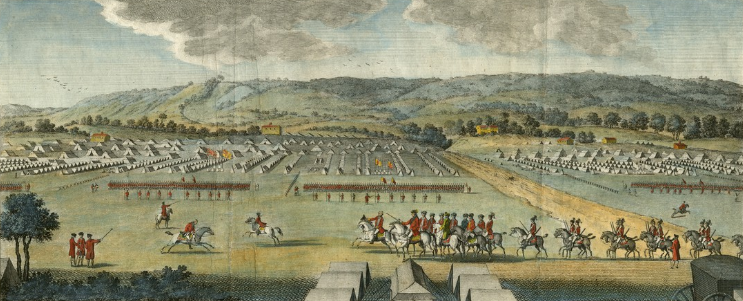
A review at Coxheath Camp.

=== American War of Independence ===
The Hertfordshire Militia was called out in May 1778 after the outbreak of the War of American Independence when the country was threatened with invasion by the Americans' allies, France and Spain. During the summer of 1778 the Hertfordshire Militia was at Coxheath Camp near Maidstone in Kent, which was the army's largest training camp, where the completely raw Militia were exercised as part of a division alongside Regular troops while providing a reserve in case of French invasion of South East England. The Hertfordshires under Col Lord Cranborne (later 7th Earl and 1st Marquess of Salisbury) formed part of the Right Wing under Maj-Gen William Amherst. Each battalion had two small field-pieces or 'battalion guns' attached to it, manned by men of the regiment instructed by a Royal Artillery sergeant and two gunners. From 1762 to 1786 militia regiments on service were obliged to recruit from their own county, so when the Hertfordshires were short of men in 1778 the Sergeant-Major had to be sent back to the county to find recruits. By December the regiment had dispersed to eight (soon to be 12) different winter quarters across Kent, and Lord Cranbourne was faced with the problem of training almost a complete new regiment after the previous men's terms of service ended. He complained that his officers could not prevent the new men from 'moroding ' [marauding] and appealed for concentration in fewer locations.

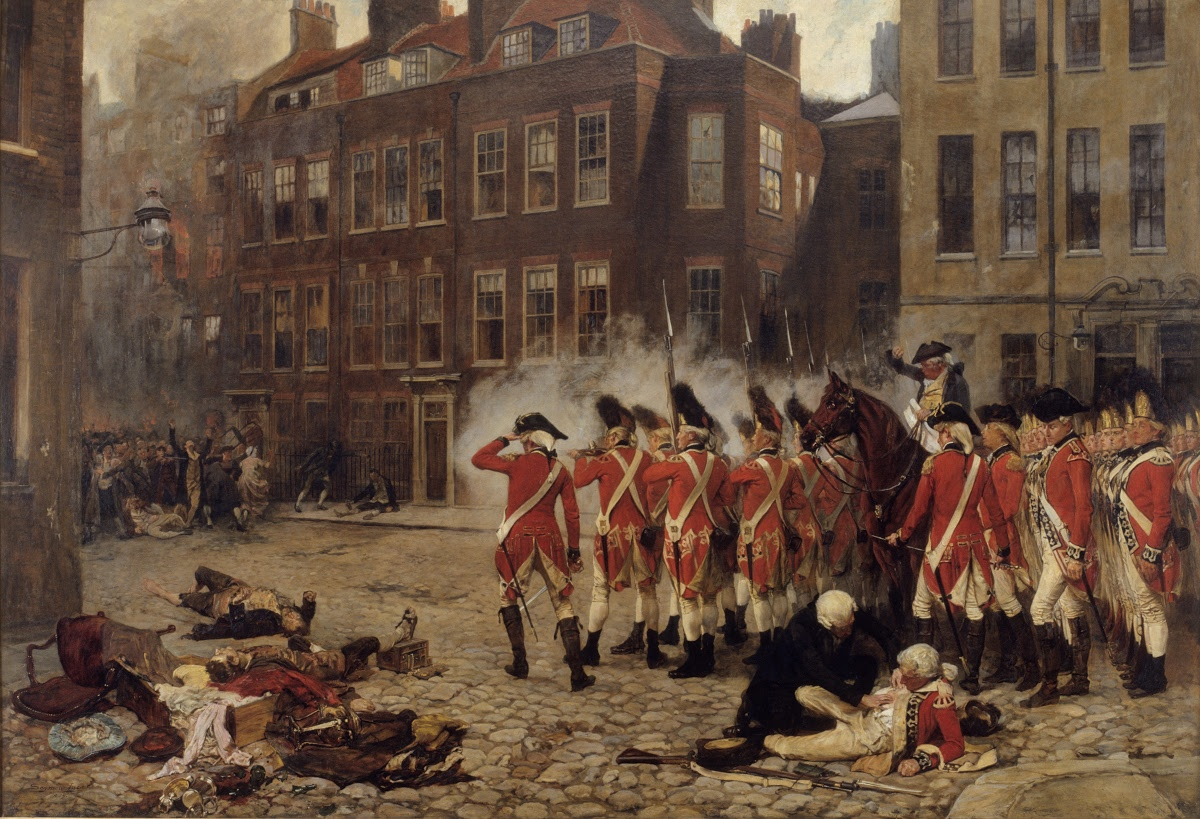
The Gordon Riots by John Seymour Lucas. Troops firing on the Gordon Rioters.

In June 1780 during the Gordon Riots the regiment was camped in Hyde Park and deployed on the streets of London. By this date troops were inoculated against Smallpox: in 1781 100 of the Hertfordshires required inoculation, which rendered them unfit for service for about three weeks. A peace treaty having ended the American war, the Hertfordshire Militia was disembodied in October 1783. To help his discharged men re-enter civilian life, the Earl of Salisbury employed 200 of them on the improvements he was making to his Hatfield estate. From 1784 to 1792 the militia were assembled for their 28 days' annual training, but to save money only two-thirds of the men were actually called out each year.

=== French Wars ===
The militia were called out in January 1793 shortly before Revolutionary France declared war on Britain. The Hertfordshire Militia was embodied at St Albans in February, still under the command of the Marquess of Salisbury. During the French Wars the militia were employed anywhere in the country for coast defence, manning garrisons, guarding prisoners of war, and for internal security, while the regulars regarded them as a source of trained men if they could be persuaded to transfer. Their traditional local defence duties were taken over by the part-time Volunteers and mounted Yeomanry.

In March 1793 the Hertfordshire Militia was deployed to the Sevenoaks area and later to Ipswich and Warley, returning to winter quarters around Hertford in October. It marched out again in May 1794 and spent the summer under canvas, camped on Warley Common. It was billeted in the Chelmsford area for the winter. A steep rise in food prices in 1795 led to trouble in many militia regiments. During the year the Hertfordshires were involved in food riots while stationed in Chichester. In June 1795 the regiment was part of a large camp at Warley, Essex, under Lt-Gen Cornwallis. In April 1797 the Hertfordshires were stationed at Harwich in Essex, and provided a guard of honour when the Prince of Wurttemberg arrived by sea to marry Princess Charlotte. In 1797 the regiment returned to Ipswich and then in 1798 it moved to Reading Street Barracks at Ashford, Kent, where it remained until October 1799, when it marched to Beaconsfield.

In a fresh attempt to have as many men as possible under arms for home defence in order to release regulars, the Government created the Supplementary Militia, a compulsory levy of men to be trained in their spare time, and to be incorporated in the Militia in emergency. Hertfordshire's additional quota was fixed at 500 men, bringing the establishment of its regiment up to 1060. In May 1800 the regiment was stationed in the St Albans area to take part in a Royal Review at Hatfield, after which it moved to Colchester. In July 1801 it was sent to guard the great Prisoner-of-war camp at Norman Cross. In December it went to winter quarters in the Hertford district until it was disembodied in April 1802 after the Treaty of Amiens.

The Peace of Amiens was short-lived and the regiment was re-embodied at St Albans in May 1803. In 1804 it was at Ipswich and during the summer of 1805, when Napoleon was massing his 'Army of England' at Boulogne for a projected invasion, the Hertfordshires, with 514 men in 10 companies under Lt-Col Robert Chester, were at Ipswich Barracks as part of a militia brigade under Lt-Gen Lord Charles Fitzroy. It remained in East Anglia until July 1808 when it moved to Sunderland and later Hull, returning to Ipswich in October 1809.

=== Hertfordshire Local Militia ===
Although the volunteer corps had been reformed after the resumption of the war, their quality varied widely and their numbers steadily declined. One of the chief reasons to join was to avoid the militia ballot. They were supplemented from 1808 by the Local Militia, which were part-time and only to be used within their own districts. If their ranks could not be filled voluntarily the militia ballot was employed. Three regiments were organised in Hertfordshire, largely from the existing volunteers units, and commanded by the local members of parliament (MPs):

- Midland Battalion – headquarters (HQ) at Hitchin, covering the Hundreds of Odsey, Edwinstree (part), Broadwater and Hitchin. Absorbed the Hitchin Volunteer Infantry, the Hertfordshire Rifles and the 1st Regiment Hertfordshire Volunteer Infantry. The Colonel-Commandant was the Hon Thomas Brand (later Lord Dacre), MP for Hertfordshire, who had commanded the Kimpton Rifles in the earlier Volunteers. The battalion usually carried out its training at Hitchin, but in 1809 it trained at Stevenage. The regulars tried to attract recruits from the local militia, but between June 1809 and November 1811 the Midland Battalion supplied just four.
- Eastern Battalion – HQ at Hertford, covering the Hundreds of Hertford, Braughing and Edwinstree (part). Absorbed the Standon Volunteer Infantry and the 2nd Regiment Hertfordshire Volunteer Infantry. The Lieutenant-Colonel Commandant was Nicolson Calvert of Hunsdon, MP for Hertford.
- Western Battalion – HQ at St Albans, covering the Hundreds of Cashio and Dacorum. Absorbed the Loyal Hemel Hempstead, St Albans and Watford Volunteer Infantry. Commanded by Lt-Col Sir John Sebright, 7th Baronet, MP for Hertfordshire.

There was a mutiny of the Hertfordshire Local Militia at St Albans in 1810 when the men demanded extra pay while training. They broke open the local prison but the ringleaders were caught and five of them received sentences of between 100 and 150 lashes. The Local Militia was stood down in 1814.

=== Ireland ===
The Interchange Act 1811 passed in July allowed English militia regiments to serve in Ireland (and vice versa) for two years, and the Hertfordshires volunteered accordingly. The regiment embarked in September that year, being stationed at Castle Barracks, Limerick, and at Carlow, with detachments at Leitrim and Athy. It returned to England in June 1813, and after a short stay at Ipswich was guarding the French prisoners at Norman Cross from September 1813 to July 1814. By now Napoleon had abdicated and the war seemed to be over; the Hertfordshire Militia was disembodied at Hertford on 29 July. It was not re-embodied during the short Waterloo Campaign.

After the Battle of Waterloo there was another long peace. Although officers continued to be commissioned into the militia and ballots were still held, the regiments were rarely assembled for training (only in 1820, 1821, 1825 and 1831) and the permanent staffs of sergeants and drummers (who were occasionally used to maintain public order) were progressively reduced. The 2nd Marquess of Salisbury succeeded his father as colonel of the regiment.

=== 1852 reforms ===
The Militia of the United Kingdom was revived by the Militia Act 1852, enacted during a period of international tension. As before, units were raised and administered on a county basis, and filled by voluntary enlistment. Training was for 56 days on enlistment, then for 21–28 days per year, during which the men received full army pay. Under the Act, Militia units could be embodied by Royal Proclamation for full-time home defence service in three circumstances:

1. 'Whenever a state of war exists between Her Majesty and any foreign power'.
2. 'In all cases of invasion or upon imminent danger thereof'.
3. 'In all cases of rebellion or insurrection'.

In August 1852 the Earl of Verulam as Lord Lieutenant of Hertfordshire called for some 450 volunteers and the new battalion did its first training in November that year, later building up to an establishment of 30 officers and 825 other ranks. Hatfield was established as the HQ, and the Marquess of Salisbury built an office, store and armoury, which were rented to the county authorities. The active rank of colonel in the militia having been abolished, the Marquess of Salisbury became Colonel of the Regiment and Robert Smith-Dorrien, a former captain in the 3rd Light Dragoons and 16th Lancers, was appointed Lieutenant-Colonel in command of the reformed Hertfordshire Militia on 2 December 1854.

War broke out with Russia in 1854 and an expeditionary force was sent to the Crimea, the militia being called out for home defence. The Hertfordshire Militia was embodied from 27 December 1854 to June 1856 and served in Aldershot Command. However, unlike some regiments, it was not embodied when regular forces were sent to quell the Indian Mutiny.

Militia battalions now had a large cadre of permanent staff (about 30) and a number of the officers were former regulars. Around a third of the recruits and many young officers went on to join the Regular Army. During its two years of embodied service the Hertfordshire Militia provided seven commissioned officers and 500 recruits to the Regulars. The Militia Reserve introduced in 1867 consisted of present and former militiamen who undertook to serve overseas in case of war. During its training in 1869 the regiment was part of a militia brigade paraded for inspection at Woburn Park.

=== Cardwell Reforms ===
Under the 'Localisation of the Forces' scheme introduced by the Cardwell Reforms of 1872, Militia were grouped into county brigades with their local Regular battalions and Rifle Volunteer Corps. However, no regular regiment was assigned to Hertfordshire, so the county's militia and volunteers were attached to the 16th (Bedfordshire) Regiment of Foot in Brigade No 33 (Huntingdon, Bedford and Hertford) together with the Huntingdonshire and Bedfordshire Militia and volunteers. These were purely administrative arrangements, but a mobilisation scheme began to appear in the Army List from December 1875. This assigned regular and militia units to places in an order of battle of corps, divisions and brigades for the 'Active Army', even though these formations were entirely theoretical, with no staff or services assigned. The Hertfordshire Militia were assigned to 2nd Brigade of 3rd Division, VII Corps, alongside the Bedfordshire and Cambridgeshire Militia. The brigade would have mustered at Newcastle upon Tyne in time of war.

== 4th Battalion, Bedfordshire Regiment ==
c. 1924 cap badge for other ranks of the Bedfordshire and Hertfordshire Regiment. It incorporated the Hart emblem of the Hertfordshire Militia.

The Childers Reforms of 1881 took Cardwell's reforms further, formally turning the militia regiments into battalions of their linked regular regiments. Consequently, the regiment became the 4th (Hertfordshire Militia) Battalion, Bedfordshire Regiment on 1 July 1881 (the Bedfordshire Militia being the 3rd Bn).

A permanent barracks was erected for the battalion in London Road, Hertford, in 1883–4. In 1889 the 4th (Herts) Bn was brigaded with 3rd Bedfords and 3rd and 4th Suffolks for royal review at Aldershot. In October 1892, when the regiment's honorary colonel was the former (and future) Prime Minister, the 3rd Marquess of Salisbury, his eldest son Viscount Cranborne was appointed Lt-Col in command.

=== Second Boer War ===
After the disasters of Black Week at the start of the Second Boer War in December 1899, most of the regular army was sent to South Africa, and many militia units were called out to replace them for home defence. The 4th Bedfords were embodied on 16 January 1900 and volunteered for service in South Africa. The battalion embarked on 27 February in the transport Goorkha, with a strength of 25 officers and 451 other ranks (ORs) under the command of Lord Cranborne.

The battalion disembarked at Cape Town on 24 March and proceeded to Dronfield, near Kimberley, where it joined 9th Brigade occupying the south bank of the Vaal River facing General S.P. du Toit's Commando on the opposite side. On 4 April the battalion occupied the stations between the Modder River and the Orange River until it was ordered up to Fourteen Streams on the north bank of the Vaal on 19 May after du Toit had been manoeuvred out of his position, allowing the Relief of Mafeking.

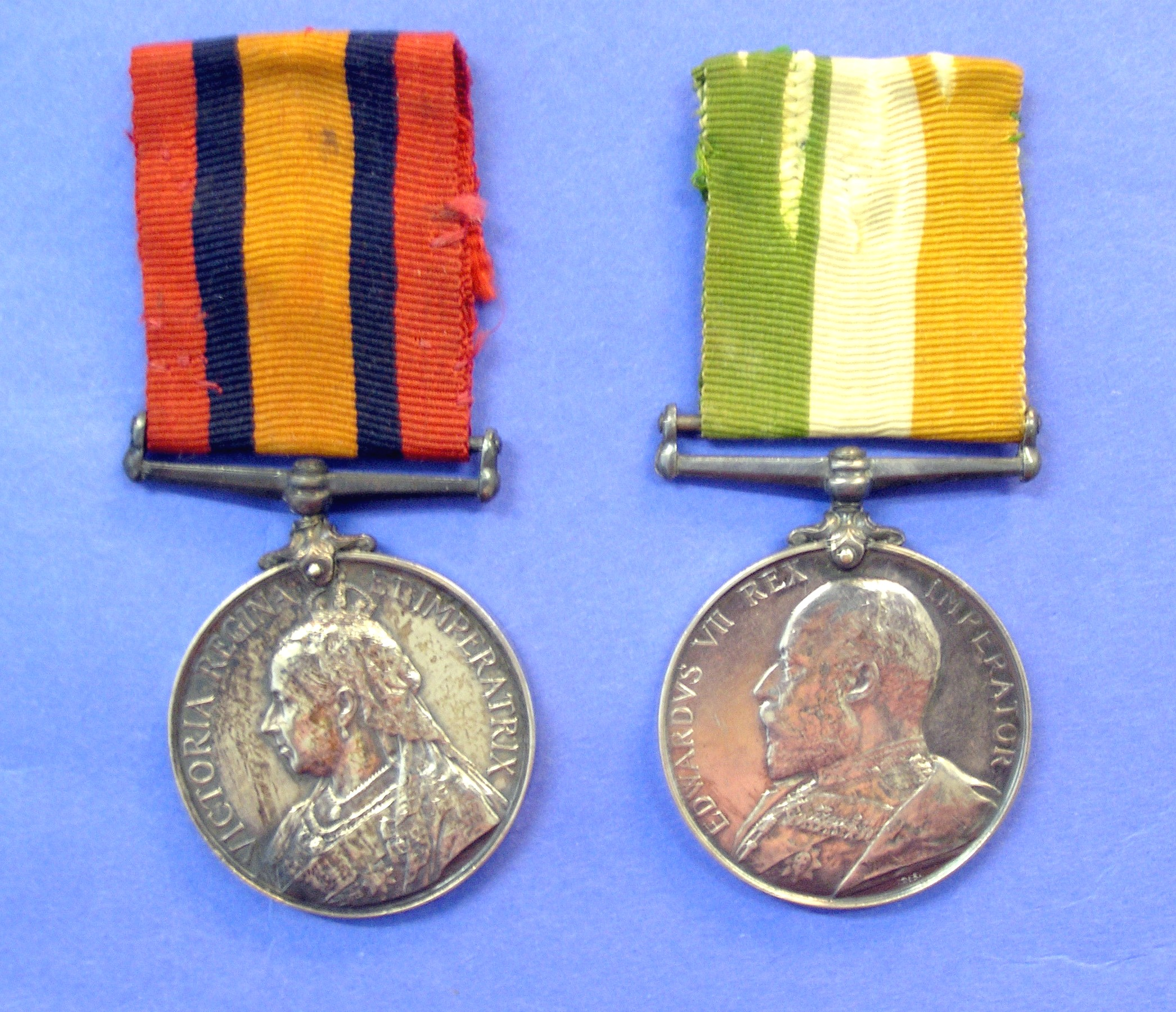
The Queen's (L) and King's (R) South Africa Medals awarded to participants in the Second Boer War.

The battalion remained at Fourteen Streams until 26 June when it went to Mafeking on 1 August. Here it formed a Mounted infantry company that served with Lord Methuen's column for most of 1901, taking part in many engagements. At the end of the war the battalion returned home and was disembodied on 11 June 1902. It had lost 32 ORs killed or died of disease during the campaign.

The battalion was awarded the Battle Honour South Africa 1900–02 and participants received the Queen's South Africa Medal with the clasps for 'Cape Colony', 'Orange Free State' and 'Transvaal', and a number also earned the 'Wittebergen' clasp; they also received the King's South Africa Medal with the clasps for 'South Africa 1901' and 'South Africa 1902'. Viscount Cranborne was awarded a companionship of the Order of the Bath (CB), three of his officers the Distinguished Service Order (DSO) and five ORs the Distinguished Conduct Medal (DCM).

== Special Reserve ==
After the Boer War, the future of the militia was called into question. There were moves to reform the Auxiliary Forces (Militia, Yeomanry and Volunteers) to take their place in the six Army Corps proposed by the Secretary of State for War, St John Brodrick. However, little of Brodrick's scheme was carried out. Under the more sweeping Haldane Reforms of 1908, the Militia was replaced by the Special Reserve (SR), a semi-professional force whose role was to provide reinforcement drafts for regular units serving overseas in wartime, rather like the earlier Militia Reserve. The battalion became the 4th (Extra Reserve) Battalion, Bedfordshire Regiment, on completion of its annual training on 14 June 1908.

== World War I ==
=== Mobilisation ===
On the declaration of war on 4 August 1914 the 3rd and 4th SR battalions of the Bedfords went to Felixstowe and took up their war station in the Harwich garrison. The Marquess of Salisbury (formerly Viscount Cranborne) was still officially in command of the 4th Bn at the time. At Felixstowe the SR battalions carried out the dual tasks of garrison duty and preparing reinforcement drafts of regular reservists, special reservists, recruits and returning wounded for the regular battalions of the Bedfords serving on the Western Front. They organised the 9th and 10th (Reserve) Bns (see below) in the Harwich Garrison to carry out the same role for the Kitchener's Army battalions of the Bedfords. Later, however, the 4th (Extra Reserve) Battalion was one of only a few SR battalions that was employed for combat during World War I.

=== 4th (Extra Reserve) Battalion ===
On 10 July 1916 the battalion was at Landguard Fort, Felixstowe, when it was ordered to mobilise for overseas service. On 24 July it entrained for Southampton where it embarked on SS Inventor, arriving in France at Le Havre early next day. Three days later at Coupigny, together with the infantry battalion of the Honourable Artillery Company (HAC) and the 1st Artists Rifles, both former officer training units of the Territorial Force, and the 7th (Extra Reserve) Battalion, Royal Fusiliers, (7th RF) of the SR, it constituted 190th Brigade in 63rd (Royal Naval) Division. The Royal Naval Division had been formed from surplus Royal Navy (RN) reservists and Royal Marines (RM) on the outbreak of war and had taken part in the Defence of Antwerp and the Gallipoli campaign. In April 1916 the division was transferred to the War Office, taking the number of a disbanded 63rd Division, and was transported to the Western Front, where it was reorganised with one army brigade (190th) and two RN/RM brigades (188th and 189th).

After a few weeks in France, Lt-Col R.P. Croft (who had been a major when the battalion mobilised in 1914) was relieved as CO on 4 September and replaced by Maj A.E. Greenwell (the senior captain in 1914), with Capt (acting Maj) John Stanhope Collings-Wells as second-in-command. Collings-Wells had been commissioned into the 4th (Hertfordshire Militia) Bn on 17 September 1904 and promoted to captain on 3 January 1907. He went to France as a reinforcement for the 2nd (Regular) Bn on 6 November 1914 and had been wounded on 12 January 1915 and evacuated to the UK. He was promoted to temporary major on 30 January 1916 and was serving as commander of A Company in 4th Bn when it landed in France in July 1916. Collings-Wells took over command of the battalion as acting Lt-Col on 20 October 1916.

63rd (Royal Naval) Division's insignia

The reformed division, both veteran units and newly joined ones such as the SR battalions, was thoroughly trained for operations on the Western Front, with companies of 4th Bedfords attached to the Hawke and Hood (RN) battalions for their first tours of duty in the front line at Souchez and Calonne under First Army. 63rd (RN) Division then moved on 3 October to join Fifth Army in the Somme sector, where the Somme Offensive was coming to an end.

==== Ancre ====
63rd (RN) Division's first offensive operation, the Battle of the Ancre was meticulously planned. The attack was launched at 05.45 on 13 November behind a Creeping barrage. 190th Brigade was in support behind 189th Bde, with 4th Bedfords in its second line. 189th Brigade successfully overran the German front system of trenches. Thereafter confusion set in, with troops attempting to move onto the next objectives through fog, shellholes and waterlogged communication trenches. By 06.30 the results were patchy: some parties were in the German support and reserve lines, in other places the front line had not been secured. 190th Brigade was ordered forward at 06.45, and 4th Bedfords sustained heavy casualties from a strongpoint between the German first and support lines that had been missed by the leading waves. The battalion got into the support line and pushed patrols forward to Station Road. At the end of the day a mixed force of 63rd (RN) Division was just short of the second objective in front of Beaucourt-sur-l'Ancre. The battalion had lost 57 killed and died of wounds, 108 wounded and 16 missing. Next morning the barrage was renewed at 06.20 and the division was able to complete the capture of Beaucourt, with 4th Bedfords providing carrying parties to take bombs, sandbags, etc up to help consolidate the village. A protective field gun barrage deterred German counter-attacks, and 63rd (RN) Division was relieved on the morning of 15 November, having suffered heavy casualties.

After rest and training at Nouvion, 63rd (RN) Division marched back to the Ancre and was in action on the Ancre Heights in January and February 1917. 190th Brigade did not take part in the Actions of Miraumont (17–18 February), but 4th Bedfords had suffered 68 killed, 90 wounded and 48 missing (mostly believed killed) in the previous 10 days of fighting. On 23 February the Germans began their withdrawal to the Hindenburg Line (Operation Alberich). Patrols from 7th RF discovered this next day, and 4th Bedfords were ordered to push forward fighting patrols. On the morning of 25 February 63rd (RN) Division followed up through Miraumont until it was relieved by a fresher division later in the day.

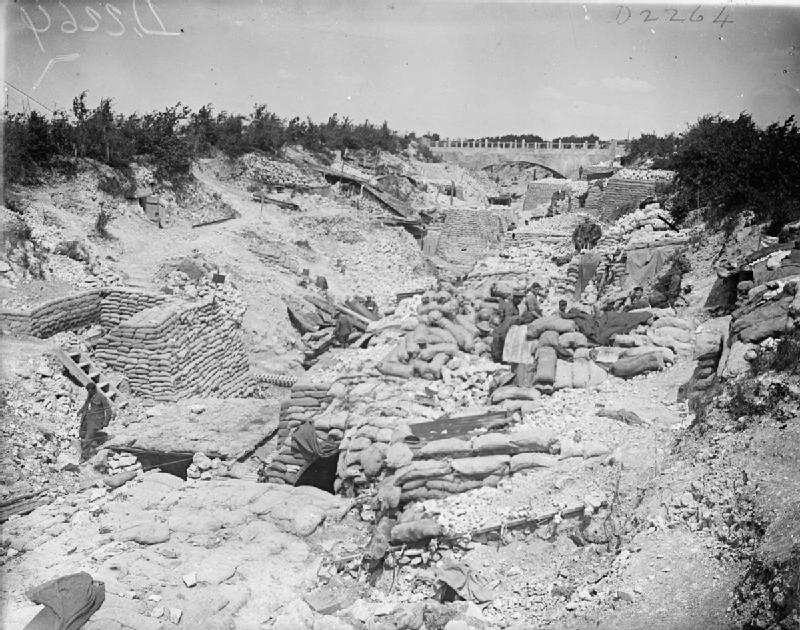
Captured German dugouts near Gavrelle, 1917.

==== Arras ====
In March the division marched north for the forthcoming Arras Offensive. It stood fast on the opening day (9 April), and remained in reserve until 14 April when 4th Bedfords went up to the line by motor buses. Next day the battalion suffered almost 60 casualties in a reconnaissance towards the village of Gavrelle. It was back in the line of 22 April for next day's attack (the Second Battle of the Scarpe). The battalion's objective was Gavrelle, which it captured and then held against fierce counter-attacks, even though 7th RF covering its left flank had been held up by uncut barbed wire. The battalion had suffered over 270 casualties and was relieved at midnight.

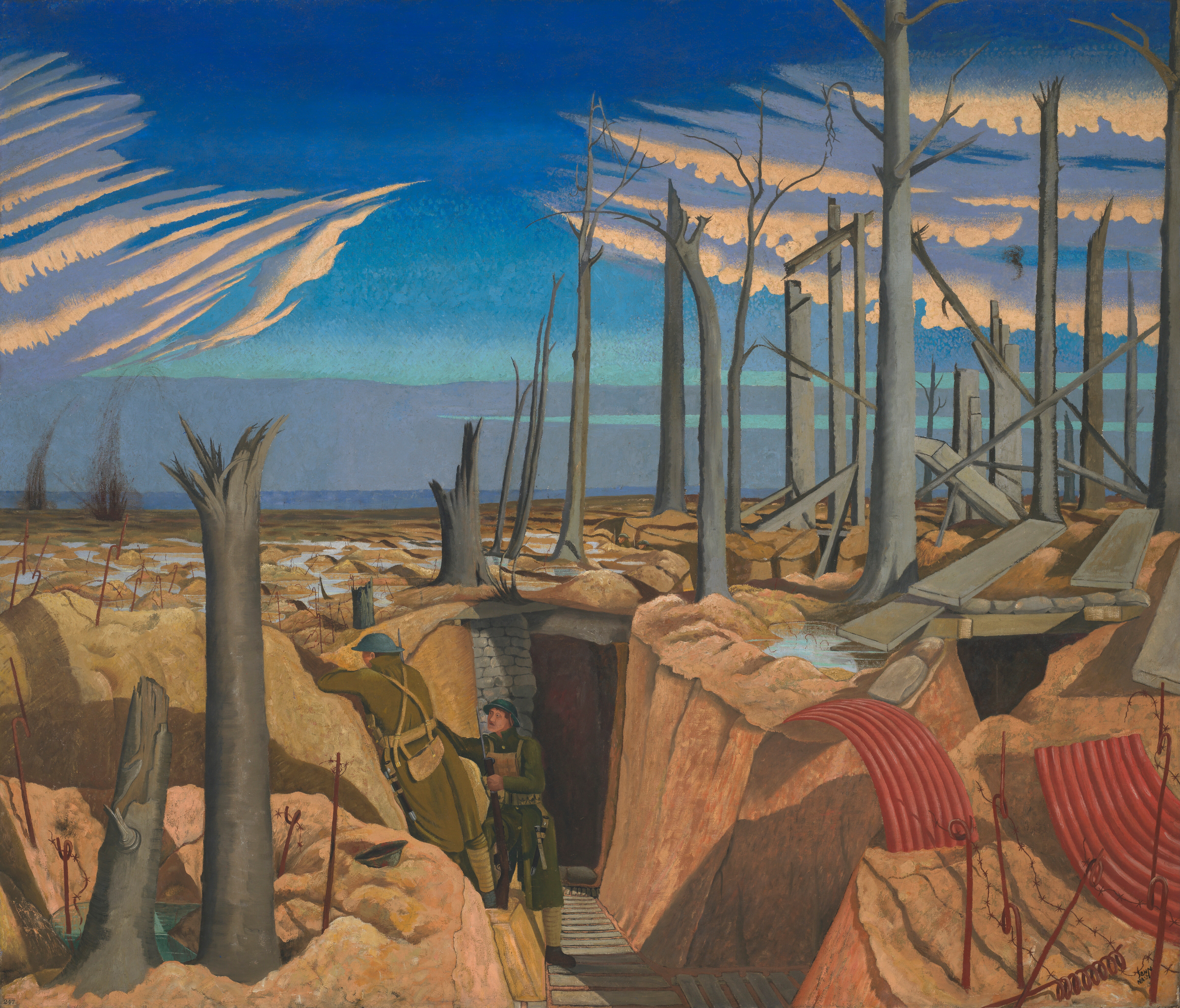
Oppy Wood, 1917. Evening by John Nash, who served there in 1st Artists Rifles.

For the next attack (the Battle of Arleux) the battered 4th Bedfords and 7th RF formed a composite battalion under the command of Collings-Wells. The attack by 188th Bde and 1st HAC on 28 April failed, and for its renewal next day the only reinforcement available was the composite battalion: 1st HAC and this battalion recaptured a strongpoint won and lost the previous day, and then 'bombed' their way forward through the German defences to get in touch with 2nd Division. 2nd Division was able to 'dribble' in some reinforcements to help, and together the mixed parties then worked their way up to within 200 yards (180 m) of Oppy Wood. Later the much-reduced 63rd (RN) Division was relieved, but fighting continued at Oppy Wood for another two months, with a steady trickle of casualties.

Collings-Wells was awarded a DSO for his leadership at Gavrelle on 23 and 24 April and at Oppy on 29 April.

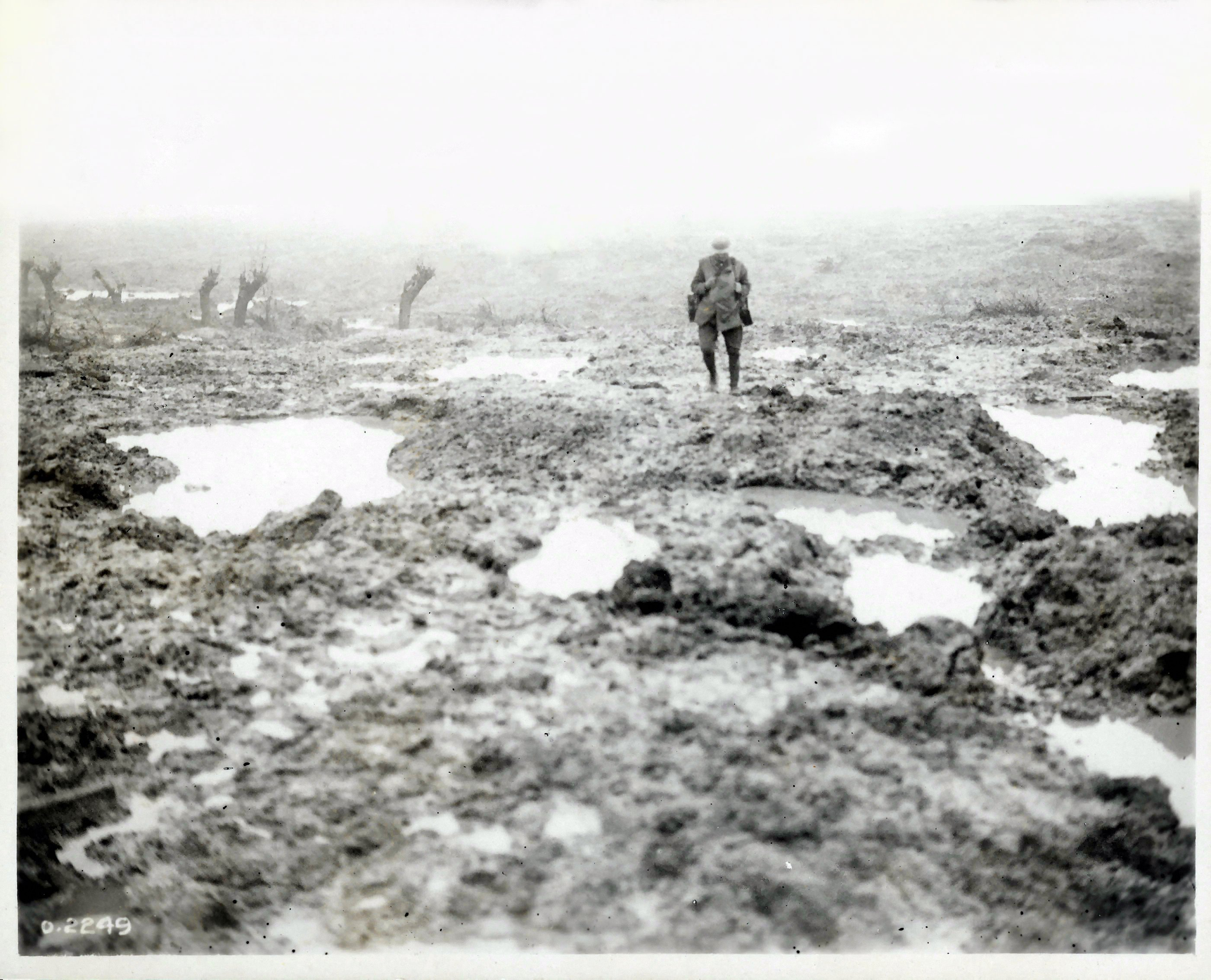
The mud of Passchendaele.

==== Winter 1917–18 ====
The division remained in the now-quiet Oppy Wood sector from July to September and was not committed to the offensive again until the final stage of the Third Ypres Offensive, the Second Battle of Passchendaele. 4th Bedfords were bussed to Ourton on 24 September and began training for the next attack. On 25 October the battalion went into the line in the Canal Bank sector near Ypres, and next day part of 63rd (RN) Division tried to advance up the valley of the Lekkerboterbeek stream through knee-deep mud. It tried again on 30 October, this time on higher ground above the Lekkerboterbeek. 190th Brigade attacked at 05.50, with 4th Bedfords in the centre, 7th RF on its left and 1st Artists Rifles on its right. Although the adjacent Canadian Corps was successful, 190th Bde was held up by the boggy ground of the Paddebeek stream and could only advance 150–200 yards (140–180 m). Men lay out in the mud all day and the next night until the battalion was relieved at 19.00 on 31 October having suffered 54 killed, 157 wounded and 23 missing.

After resting and refitting, at Eringhem and Houtkerque, the 4th Bedfords moved south with 63rd (RN) Division to join Third Army and by 21 December was holding the support trenches on Highland Ridge where the German counter-attack after the Battle of Cambrai had been halted. The battalion was in camp at Havrincourt Wood when Germans attacked again on 30 December and was moved up to the line at one hour's notice, moving into the front line next day, where it suffered a few casualties while 1st Artists Rifles and 7th RF made a bloody counter-attack towards Marcoing. The battalion spent January 1918 taking turns in the front line and suffering casualties, many from Mustard gas. On 9 February the 4th Bedfords were reinforced by a draft of 11 officers and 299 ORs from the 8th (Service) Bn of the Bedfords, a Kitchener battalion that was being disbanded. However, on 13 March the battalion was heavily shelled with mustard gas and five officers and 264 ORs had to be evacuated suffering from the effects.

==== Spring 1918 ====
When the German Spring Offensive (Operation Michael) was launched on 21 March 1918, 63rd (RN) Division was still occupying part of the Flesquières Salient, the last remaining gain from the Battle of Cambrai. This was recognised as being vulnerable, so was only held by the outpost line, the main battle zone being a shorter line further back. 4th Bedfords were in the support line when the German bombardment began at 04.00 on 21 March and their infantry attacked out of the morning fog. The outpost line was quickly captured, and 190th Bde fell back to the second line defences. Early next morning it began withdrawing from the salient, with 4th Bedfords going back to Havrincourt Wood. This was part of the British 'Green Line', but the trenches were barely started, being only 2 feet (0.61 m) deep, with no dugouts and no field of fire, though there were some huts in Léchelle. At this point the 1st Artists Rifles and the 4th Bedfords were holding a line east of Ytres, with 7th RF in support. The position rapidly grew critical, with heavy shellfire. Gaps were opening up in Third Army's line as neighbouring divisions fell back, and without further withdrawal 63rd (RN) Division's frontline troops were in danger of being cut off. That night the battalion fell back to the 'RE (Royal Engineers) Dump' north of Ytres as the retreat continued: all the ammunition dumps and stores had been set alight and blazed all night. On 24 March the division was ordered to fall back once more. It retired over the old Somme battlefields through Bazentin le Petit to Courcelette, where 4th Bedfords stopped overnight. On 25 March, thinking that the British were on the run, the Germans attacked in masses and were shot down in large numbers on the slopes. However, 4th Bedfords had to be sent back through High Wood to reinforce the right of the division, where German patrols were lapping round its flank. When their ammunition began to run out, the battalion made a fighting retreat to Thiepval, covering the rest of the brigade. On Thiepval Ridge 63rd (RN) Division covered the Ancre crossings, and it held this position until 04.00 on 26 March. It then crossed the river to Aveluy Wood. From this high ground they watched the Germans moving towards Aveluy at 08.00, when the bridges were blown. The battalion was later relieved and withdrawn to billets in Englebelmer.

During the day the Germans had occupied Albert, and that night they began advancing out of the town. 190th Brigade was alerted to counter-attack at 03.00 on 27 March, and 4th Bedfords took up positions east of Albert. At 07.30 it attacked the railway with good artillery support, but was driven back shortly after 10.00. The Germans secured a foothold in Aveluy Wood but were halted when 190th Bde was brought up again. By now the brigade was too weak to counter-attack, and the fighting died down. Lieutenant-Col Collings-Wells was killed during the battalion's attack and was later awarded a posthumous Victoria Cross (VC) for his actions on 21 and 27 March. The senior surviving officer, Capt L.G. Plumbley, took over temporary command of 4th Bedfords, which were relieved at 03.30 on 28 March and marched to billets at Forceville. Between 21 and 28 March the battalion, already weakened, had lost 21 killed, 88 wounded, and 124 missing.

Although completely exhausted, 63rd (RN) Division, remained close to the line in reserve while waiting for reinforcements – initially 4th Bedfords got just 17 ORs from the 26th (3rd Tyneside Irish) Bn Northumberland Fusiliers, which had been disbanded earlier. In the final phase of Operation Michael (the Battle of the Ancre) the enemy attacked the division's positions at dawn on 5 April. 4th Bedfords maintained their positions despite being heavily shelled, but 7th RF were driven back and a gap opened up on 6 April until a counter-attack by the Royal Marine Light Infantry regained much of the lost ground. The battalion was still taking casualties, but now large drafts arrived: 440 on 6 June, then 188 ORs from the disbanded 12th (3rd Gwent) Bn, South Wales Borderers, (originally a Bantam battalion) on 7 June. Captain R.B. Knight took over temporary command of 4th Bedfords on 9 April until Lt-Col A.G. Macdonald, DSO, of the Royal Berkshire Regiment arrived to take command on 22 April.

63rd (RN) Division took no further part in the Spring fighting while its battalions were slowly brought back to strength. It was pulled out of the line on 22 April when 4th Bedfords marched to Talmas, north of Amiens and began training and providing working parties. It returned to the front line in the Acheux Wood/Aveluy Wood sector on 7 May and alternated spells in the front line with billets in Forceville or tents in Toutencourt Wood. Lieutenant-Col F.W. Smith, DSO, DCM, assumed command of the battalion on 20 May, but was evacuated sick a month later and Maj A.G. Haywood, MC, took over as acting Lt-Col on 26 June.

==== Hundred Days Offensive ====
The Allies had launched their Hundred Days Offensive on 8 August. The battalion underwent training in early August, then marched to Souastre, south-west of Arras, where it went into the line at 'Leeds Trench' on 20 August for 63rd (RN) Division's attack (the Battle of Albert). The battalion found the march-in difficult because the road was blocked by lorries and tanks. Zero hour was 04.55 on 21 August, and the leading formations found themselves attacking through a thick fog; by the time 63rd (RN) Division advanced (4th Bedfords moved off at 05.25) the fog was thickened by smoke and the advance became confused. However, the battalion advanced astride a convenient trench to maintain direction, with the support of five tanks. They dealt with parties of the enemy who had been missed by the leading formations, then found that the attack had been held up short of the objective (the Achiet-le-Grand–Miraumont railway). 190th Brigade was ordered to consolidate the line achieved. Next morning 4th Bedfords drove back some parties of Germans but the adjacent 7th RF found their positions turned by a strong counter-attack and had a stiff fight. Arrangements to air-drop ammunition to the forward positions did not work well – it fell in No man's land and in the wood – and 4th Bedfords had to lend ammunition to 7th RF until supplies were brought up at 18.00. The division was relieved that night and 4th Bedfords went back to Leeds Trench.

The supporting artillery having been pulled forward, 63rd (RN) Division renewed the attack on 25 August, attempting to capture Thilloy, Ligny Thilloy and Riencourt-lès-Bapaume, near Bapaume. The two attacking brigades were held up and 190th Bde in support was sent to secure the right flank, which was exposed to machine gun fire. Next day the attack was renewed, with 4th Bedfords formed up 700 yards (640 m) behind the attacking brigades, but they failed to make progress. At 11.00 on 27 August 63rd (RN) Division made another attempt on Thilloy and Ligny Thilloy. This time 190th Bde was to lead the attack and 4th Bedfords formed up in a sunken road known as 'Red Cut'. The barrage at Zero fell short, causing casualties among the assembled troops, who ran into machine gun fire as soon as they left Red Cut, especially from the right flank where 21st Division's attack had been cancelled at the last moment. Only a short advance could be made before the battalion was pinned down by machine gun and sniper fire. The assault was resumed at 18.00 after a 1 1 1/2 hour bombardment by heavy artillery and following a renewed field gun barrage. Again, some of the heavy shells fell short, causing casualties among B Company in the centre. Some of C Company on the left went right through Thilloy, but the battalion's centre and right were again held up by flanking fire, and the survivors of C Company withdrew to avoid being surrounded. By the end of the day the battalion was back in Red Cut, the only suitable defensive position against counter-attacks. The CO blamed the failure on the cancellation of 21st Division's supporting attack, and wrote bitterly that if the requested tanks had been available a single battalion could have achieved the objectives. 7th Royal Fusiliers alongside 4th Bedfords had been virtually destroyed and their regimental historian described the operation as 'a disastrous day'. On 28 August 4th Bedfords marched out to Miraumont and 190th Bde did not take part in the division's next few operations.

After a period of training, 4th Bedfords were back in the line near Moeuvres for the Battle of the Canal du Nord on 27 September. It successfully crossed the canal and reached its objective in the old Hindenburg support line, having suffered 13 killed and 68 wounded. It moved forward to Cantaing-sur-Escaut and on 30 September attacked the high ground south of Cambrai. 63rd (RN) Division then went into reserve and there was a pause before the Battle of Cambrai was launched on 8 October. 63rd (RN) Division's objective was Niergnies, which was captured by 188th Bde leading to the capture of Cambrai itself. 4th Bedfords helped to drive back two German counter-attacks accompanied by tanks.

63rd (RN) Division was then pulled out and sent north by train to join First Army near St Pol, where it trained and reorganised. Lieutenant-Col C.C. Harman replaced Lt-Col Hayward as CO of 4th Bedfords. The advance was now turning into a pursuit through Belgium, and the division joined in during November. On the afternoon of 8 November 4th Bedfords took the lead, attacking towards Blaregnies and driving the enemy into the village. The battalion captured Blaregnies at 07.00 next morning and pushed on through Sars-la-Bruyère to attack Quévy-le-Petit. On 10 November the battalion moved to Bougnies and began an attack on Asquillies, which it had captured by 09.00. It then moved on to Nouvelles and consolidated east of the village. 63rd (RN) Division had now secured the high ground beyond Harveng, south of Mons. At 17.00 the battalion attacked from Harveng to Harmignies, which it captured at 01.00 on 11 November. The Armistice with Germany came into effect at 11.00 that day, ending hostilities.

A detachment represented 4th Bedfords at Gen Sir Henry Horne's official entry into Mons on 15 November and at the end of the month the battalion left Harmignies for Erquennes where it went into winter quarters. The division had been informed that it would not form part of the army of occupation (British Army of the Rhine). Although many men rejoined the battalion, demobilisation, first of key workers, then more generally, began in December and by April 1919 the units had been reduced to a cadre.

=== 10th (Reserve) Battalion ===
After Lord Kitchener issued his call for volunteers in August 1914, the battalions of the 1st, 2nd and 3rd New Armies ('K1', 'K2' and 'K3' of 'Kitchener's Army') were quickly formed at the regimental depots. The SR battalions also swelled with new recruits and were soon well above their establishment strength. On 8 October 1914 each SR battalion was ordered to use the surplus to form a service battalion of the 4th New Army ('K4'). Accordingly, the 4th (Extra Reserve) Bn formed the 10th (Service) Bn of the Bedfords at Dovercourt in the Harwich Garrison on 2 December 1914. It trained to be part of 106th Brigade in 35th Division, moving in January 1915 to White City, London. On 10 April 1915 the War Office decided to convert the K4 battalions into reserve units, providing drafts for the K1–K3 battalions in the same way that the SR was doing for the Regular battalions. The battalion became 10th (Reserve) Battalion in 6th Reserve Brigade. In May the battalion moved to join the brigade at Colchester, returning to Dovercourt in March 1916. On 1 September 1916 it was redesignated 27th Training Reserve Bn, still in 2nd Reserve Bde. It returned to the Bedfordshire Regiment on 24 October 1917 as 53rd (Young Soldier) Bn.

After the war ended it was converted into 53rd (Service) Battalion, and in April 1919 it was sent to join the occupation forces in Germany as part of 102nd Brigade in Eastern Division of British Army of the Rhine. The division was disbanded in October 1919 and the battalion returned to the UK to be disbanded at Ripon on 19 March 1920.

=== Postwar ===
The SR resumed its old title of Militia in 1921 and then became the Supplementary Reserve in 1924, but like most militia battalions the 4th Bedfords remained in abeyance after World War I. By the outbreak of World War II in 1939, there were no officers listed for the battalion. (Note: However, the Bedfordshire and Hertfordshire Regiment (as it had now become) did have a number of Supplementary Reserve officers Category B attached to it.) The Militia was formally disbanded in April 1953.

== Heritage and ceremonial ==
=== Uniforms and insignia ===
The Orange, Green and Black Auxiliary Trained Band regiments took their names from the colour of their company flags. The Watford Volunteer Horse were issued with buff leather coats and sleeves in July 1642, and the foot soldiers of the Orange Regiment were issued with blue coats and grey breeches.

From its reformation in 1759 the Hertfordshire Militia wore red uniforms with buff facings; in 1780 these were depicted as light pinkish-buff. The regiment retained buff facings throughout its independent existence. In 1759 the regimental colour bore the coat of arms of the county of Hertfordshire on a buff field. The uniform of all three Local Militia battalions was also red with buff facings. When the Bedfordshire Regiment was formed in 1881 the 4th Battalion gave up its former buff facings and adopted the standard white facings of an English county regiment.

The regiment's cap badge was a hart (male deer) crossing a ford – a pun on 'Hertford' (pronounced Hartford). The buttons carried a crowned garter inscribed 'Harts Militia' (sic). By around 1880 the Hertfordshire Militia had adopted a hart as its mascot. The Bedfordshire Regiment combined the hart badge with that of the 16th Foot. The full dress helmet plate featured a Maltese cross superimposed on an eight-pointed star, in the centre of which was the hart crossing a ford. A similar design was used for the cap badge adopted in 1898, with the addition of a garter around the central device, and a scroll with the regiment's title. The collar badge was also the hart in a ford.

=== Precedence ===
In September 1759 it was ordered that militia regiments on service were to take precedence from the date of their arrival in camp. In 1760 this was altered to a system of drawing lots where regiments did duty together. During the War of American Independence the counties were given an order of precedence determined by ballot each year. For the Hertfordshire Militia the positions were:

- 32nd on 1 June 1778
- 19th on 12 May 1779
- 2nd on 6 May 1780
- 23rd on 28 April 1781
- 13th on 7 May 1782

The militia order of precedence balloted for in 1793 (Hertfordshire was 44th) remained in force throughout the French Revolutionary War. Another ballot for precedence took place in 1803 at the start of the Napoleonic War, when Hertfordshire was 33rd. This order continued until 1833. In that year the King drew the lots for individual regiments and the resulting list remained in force with minor amendments until the end of the militia. The regiments raised before the peace of 1763 took the first 47 places; Hertfordshire was placed at 30th, and this was retained when the list was revised in 1855

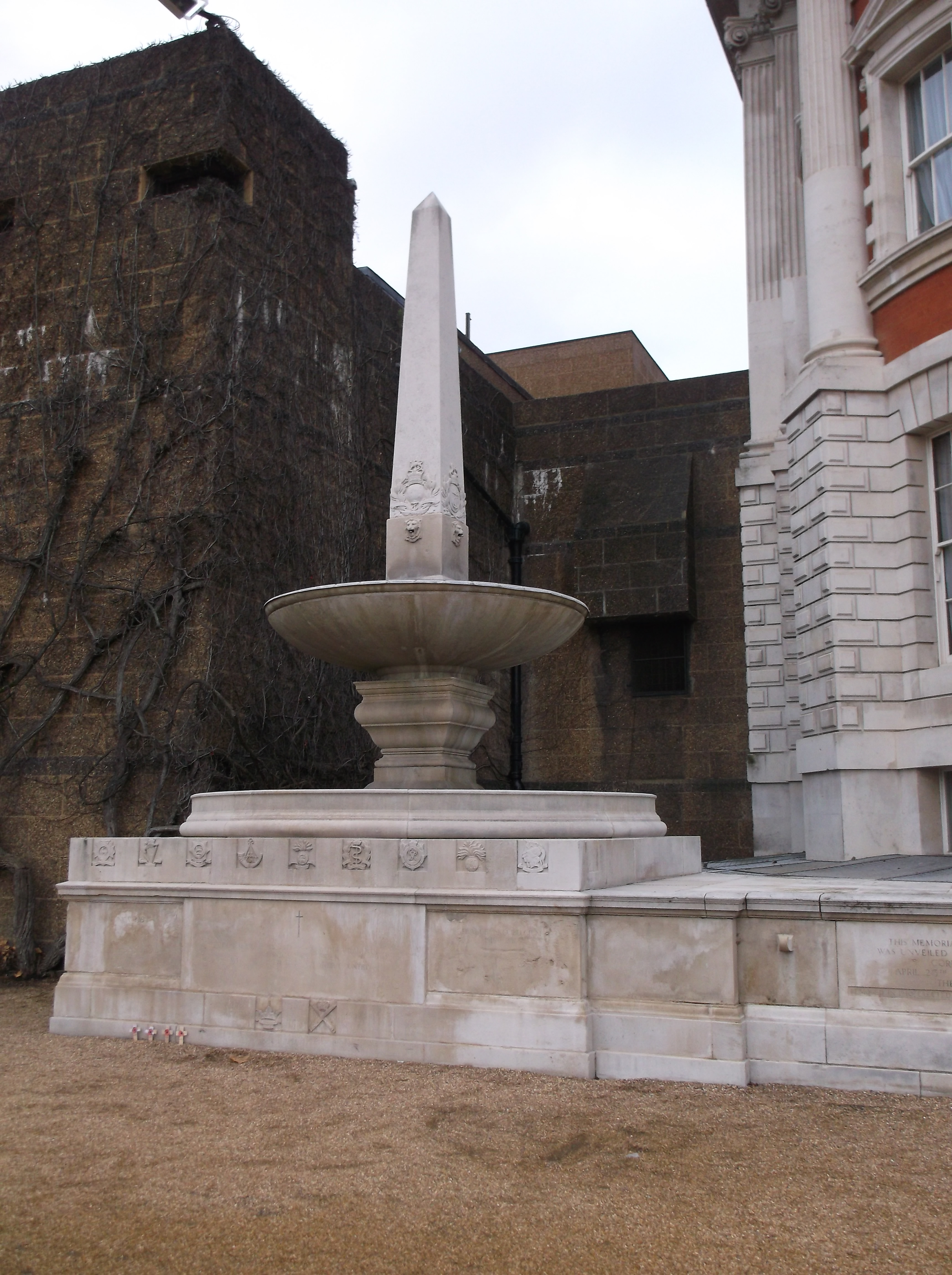
The Royal Naval Division Memorial at Horse Guards Parade.

=== Memorials ===
There is a memorial tablet on the wall of the public library in Old Cross, Hertford, to the men of the town who volunteered for service in the Second Boer War with the 4th Bn Bedfordshire Regiment, '(Harts Militia)' (sic), the Hertfordshire Imperial Yeomanry and the 1st (Hertfordshire) Volunteer Bn, Bedfordshire Regiment.

Hertford's World War I and II memorial carries a sculpture of the White Hart on a cenotaph.

The battalion's World War I service is commemorated by the Royal Naval Division War Memorial on Horse Guards Parade.

== See also ==
- Trained Bands
- Militia (English)
- Militia (Great Britain)
- Militia (United Kingdom)
- Special Reserve
- Bedfordshire Regiment
