= Bedfordshire and Hertfordshire Regiment =

- c. 1924 regimental cap badge for other ranks
- Active: 1688–1958
- Country: England (1688–1707); Great Britain (1707–1800); United Kingdom (1801–1958)
- Branch: English Army; British Army
- Type: Infantry
- Role: Line infantry
- Garrison/HQ: Kempston Barracks, Kempston
- Nicknames: The Old Bucks; The Peacemakers; The Featherbeds
- Colours: Deep yellow facings until 1881, white thereafter
- March: The Mountain Rose until 1882, La Mandolinata from 1882
- Anniversaries: Blenheim Day, August (The Battle of Blenheim, 1704)
- Engagements: Nine Years War, War of the Spanish Succession, American War of Independence, Second Boer War, Irish War of Independence, First World War, Second World War

The Bedfordshire and Hertfordshire Regiment was the final title of a line infantry regiment of the British Army that was originally formed in 1688. After centuries of service in many conflicts and wars, including both the First and Second World Wars, the regiment was amalgamated with the Essex Regiment in 1958 to form the 3rd East Anglian Regiment (16th/44th Foot). However, this was short-lived and again was amalgamated, in 1964, with the 1st East Anglian Regiment (Royal Norfolk and Suffolk) and 2nd East Anglian Regiment (Duchess of Gloucester's Own Royal Lincolnshire and Northamptonshire), and the Royal Leicestershire Regiment to form the present Royal Anglian Regiment.

== History ==
=== Formation; 1688 – 1751 ===
The regiment was formed on 9 October 1688 in Reading, Berkshire, in response to a possible invasion by William of Orange, later William III; its first commander was Colonel Archibald Douglas, formerly of The Royal Regiment. On 5 November 1688, William landed in Torquay, James was deserted by his troops and he went into exile. Douglas was replaced by his deputy Robert Hodges, an experienced soldier who served in the Royal Regiment and the Tangier Garrison.

As a result of England's involvement in the 1689–1697 Nine Years War, the regiment was posted to Flanders; between 1689 and 1693, it fought at the battles of Walcourt, Steenkirk and Neer Landen, as well as the 1695 Siege of Namur. Hodges was killed at Steenkirk and replaced by James Stanley, later Earl of Derby.

The regiment at the Battle of Blenheim

The war ended with the 1697 Treaty of Ryswick and the regiment transferred onto the Irish establishment, based at Carrickfergus. When the War of the Spanish Succession began in 1702, it returned to Flanders and served throughout Marlborough's campaigns, including the capture of Liège in 1702, as well as the battles of Schellenberg, Blenheim, Ramillies, the Oudenarde and Malplaquet. After the Treaty of Utrecht in 1714, it moved to Scotland and held Fort William during the Jacobite Rising of 1715.

In 1739, long-standing commercial tensions with Spain led to the War of Jenkins' Ear, which took place largely in the Caribbean and North America. After a brief period as a marine unit, it was sent to the West Indies in January 1741, an area notorious for high mortality rates. A detachment took part in the failed assault on Cartagena de Indias; the troops suffered enormous losses from yellow fever, estimated as between 80 and 90%.

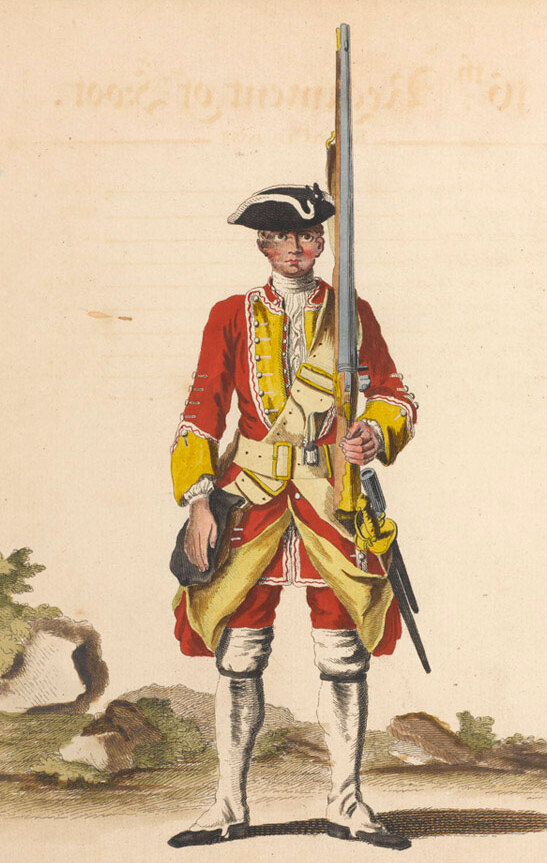
c. 1742 engraving of a regimental private

The few survivors returned to England in 1742 and the unit brought back up to strength, while the conflict with Spain expanded into the wider European struggle known as the War of the Austrian Succession. Shortly after the Allied defeat at Fontenoy in May 1745, the regiment moved to Flanders and suffered heavy losses at Melle in July. It retreated to Antwerp and then shipped to Scotland to suppress the Jacobite Rising of 1745 but arrived after the rebellion had been defeated. The regiment remained there until 1749, when it moved to Ireland.

=== 16th Regiment of Foot (1751 – 1782) ===
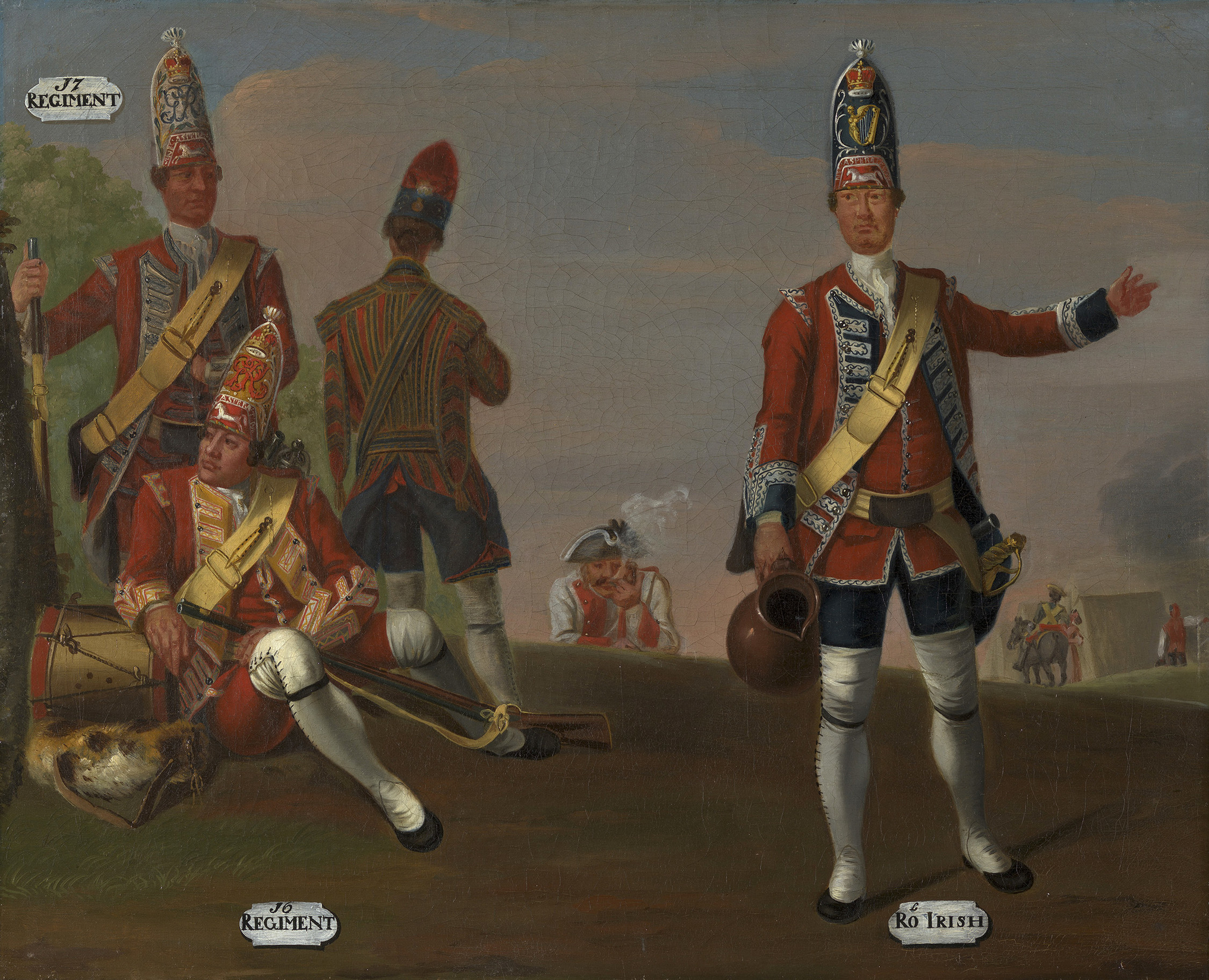
c. 1751 painting of a regimental grenadier (left, seated)

In 1751, a royal warrant declared that regiments should no longer be known by the name of their colonel, but their number in the order of precedence, and Handasyd's duly became the 16th Regiment of Foot.

==== American War of Independence ====
The 16th Foot remained in Ireland until 1767, when it sailed to Florida, establishing a headquarters at Pensacola with detachments in various areas of the territory. When the American War of Independence broke out in 1776, the regiment was ordered to New York, but returned south in the following year to various garrisons in Florida and Georgia. In 1778, Spanish forces invaded the area from Louisiana, and part of the 16th was captured with the fall of Baton Rouge. Other detachments helped repel French attacks on Savannah in September 1779 and Pensacola in May 1781. The remains of the 16th Foot returned to England, arriving in March 1782.

=== 16th (Buckinghamshire) Regiment of Foot (1782 – 1809) ===
In August 1782, county designations were added to the numbers of the regiments of foot to encourage recruitment. The regiment duly became the 16th (Buckinghamshire) Regiment of Foot. With the end of the American war, the regiment was reduced to a peacetime complement in 1783, and in the following year moved to garrison duty in Ireland.

==== West Indies ====
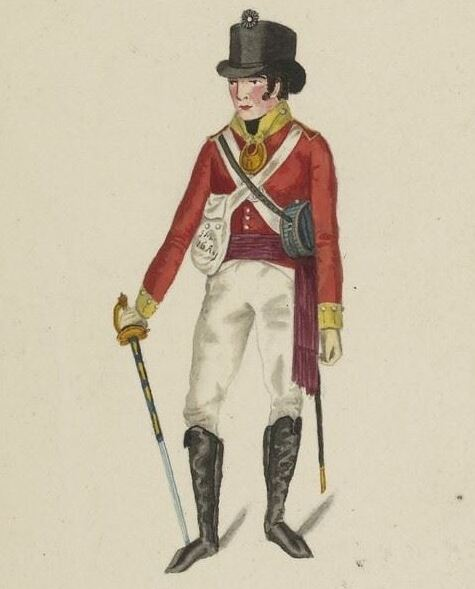
A regimental officer in 1804

In August 1790, the 16th Foot sailed to Nova Scotia, moving in the following year to Jamaica. In 1793, British forces invaded the French colony of Saint-Domingue during the War of the First Coalition. The 16th Regiment of Foot was part of the British forces sent to the colony, but were all but wiped out by yellow fever: only an officer and sergeant of the regiment returned alive to Jamaica in 1794. The 16th Foot, as part of the British garrison in Jamaica, fought in the Second Maroon War of 1795–96, before returning to England in late 1796. The much-depleted regiment attempted to recruit in Scotland, before being brought up to strength by volunteers from English militia regiments in 1798. In 1799–1804, the 16th Foot was stationed in England, Scotland and Ireland.

==== Surinam ====
In January 1804, the 16th Foot sailed for Barbados, arriving in March. On arrival, it formed part of an expeditionary force formed to capture the Dutch colony of Surinam. In May, the Dutch forces surrendered. Detachments of the regiment remained at various locations in Barbados and Surinam, returning gradually to England between 1810 and 1812.

=== 16th (Bedfordshire) Regiment of Foot (1809 – 1881) ===
In 1809, titles were exchanged with the 14th (Bedfordshire) Regiment of Foot at the request of its colonel who held substantial lands in Buckinghamshire, after which time it became the 16th (Bedfordshire) Regiment of Foot. The regiment took no part in the Napoleonic Wars that was being fought on the continent of Europe, being stationed in England, Scotland and Ireland before sailing to Canada in 1814. It returned to England in August 1815, moving directly to France to form part of the army of occupation following the final defeat of Napoleon. In 1816 the 16th Foot moved to Ireland, remaining there until 1819.

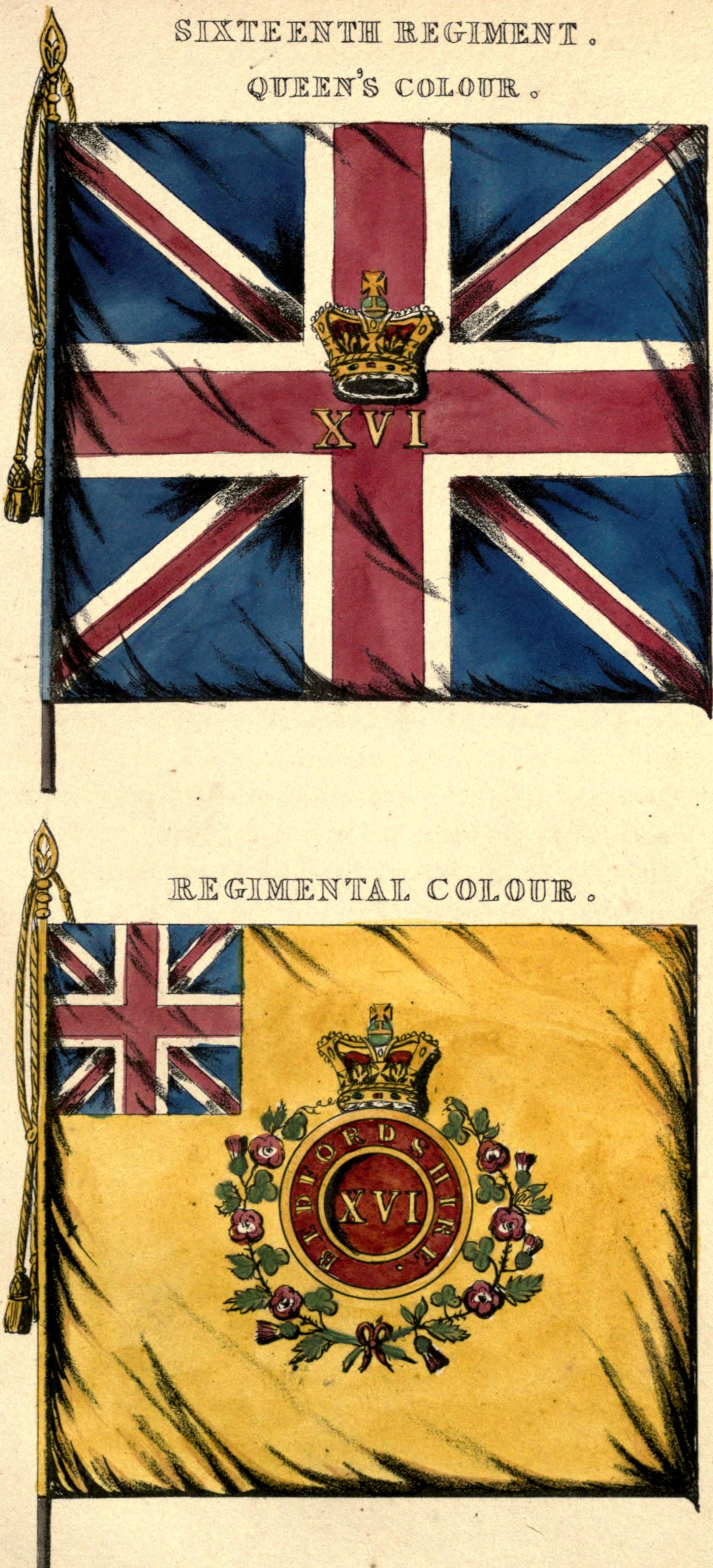
1848 illustration of the regimental colours

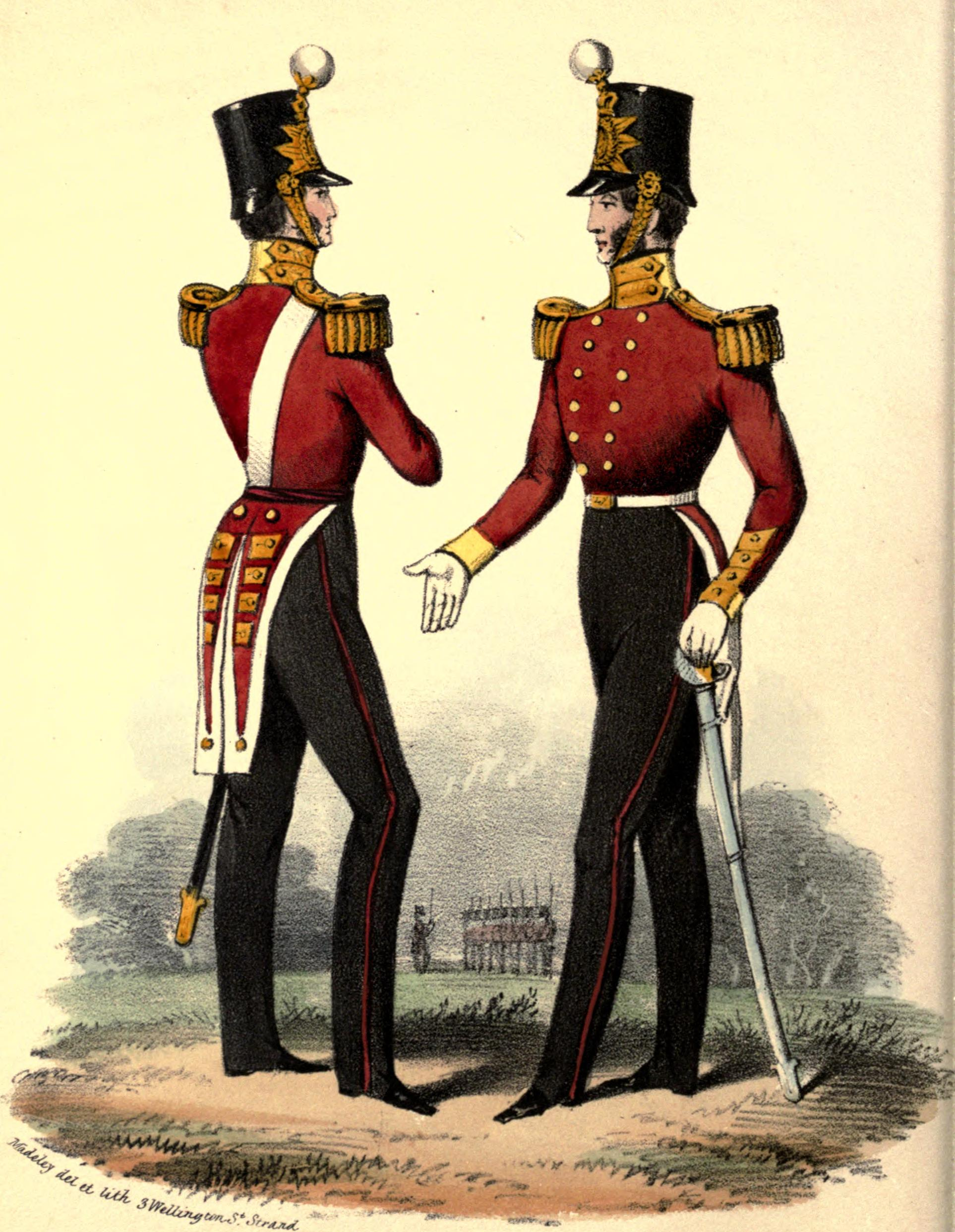
1848 illustration of two regimental officers

In 1820, the regiment began a long term of colonial service. It was stationed in Ceylon (now Sri Lanka) until 1828, when it moved to the Bengal Presidency. It returned to England between December 1840 and January 1841. In 1843 it took up garrison duties in Ireland, remaining there until 1846 when it moved to Gibraltar. In the following year, it moved to Corfu, forming part of the garrison of the United States of the Ionian Islands, a British protectorate.

In 1851, the 16th Foot returned to Jamaica, moving to Canada in 1854. It returned to the United Kingdom in 1857, where it was initially stationed in Ireland and moved to England in 1859.

==== Formation of second battalion and service to 1881 ====
Following the Indian Mutiny of 1857, the British Army took over responsibility for maintaining a garrison in the sub-continent from the Honourable East India Company. This new commitment necessitated an increase in the size of the army, and the 1st to 25th regiments of foot were each authorised to raise a second battalion. Accordingly, the 16th Foot raised a second battalion in Ireland in July 1859.

In 1861, both battalions sailed separately to Canada, as part of a reinforcement of British forces there in reaction to the American Civil War. The diplomatic crisis brought about by the Trent Affair increased tensions, with expectations of war against the United States only receding in 1862.

On 21 May 1863, Jesse Wright published a notice that he had discovered the corpse of a disfigured British soldier with his hands cut off washed up on the coast of the Wolf Islands dressed in his military uniform as 1st Battalion infantryman with the Bedfordshire and Hertfordshire Regiment 16th Regiment.

The 1st Battalion left Canada for the Imperial fortress of Bermuda in 1865 and the 2nd moved to Barbados in 1866. In 1869 the 2nd Battalion returned to England, with the 1st Battalion moving to Ireland in 1870. The 1st Battalion remained at various home stations in Jersey (Channel Islands), England and Ireland, while the 2nd Battalion moved to Madras in India in 1876.

The regiment was not fundamentally affected by the Cardwell Reforms of the 1870s, which gave it a depot at Kempston Barracks near Bedford from 1873, or by the Childers reforms of 1881 – as it already possessed two battalions, there was no need for it to amalgamate with another regiment.

=== The Bedfordshire Regiment (1881 – 1919) ===
==== Childers reforms ====
On 1 July 1881, the Childers Reforms came into effect. These were the logical continuation of the 1873 reforms: the regimental numbers of infantry regiments were replaced with territorial titles, "brigade districts" were renamed as "regimental districts", and the local militia and rifle volunteer corps were affiliated to the new regiments. Accordingly, the 16th Foot became The Bedfordshire Regiment. The regimental district comprised the counties of Bedfordshire and Hertfordshire.

==== Regimental structure ====
When the Bedfordshire Regiment was formed on 1 July 1881, it consisted of two regular, two militia and three volunteer battalions, with the regimental depot being based at Kempston barracks:

- 1st Battalion (formerly 1st Battalion, 16th (Bedfordshire) Regiment of Foot raised in 1688)
- 2nd Battalion (formerly 2nd Battalion, 16th (Bedfordshire) Regiment of Foot raised 1858)
- 3rd (Militia) Battalion (formerly Bedfordshire Light Infantry Militia)
- 4th (Militia) battalion (formerly Hertfordshire Militia)
- 1st Hertfordshire Rifle Volunteer Corps: redesignated 1st (Hertfordshire) Volunteer Battalion in 1887
- 2nd Hertfordshire Rifle Volunteer Corps: redesignated 2nd (Hertfordshire) Volunteer Battalion in 1887
- 1st Bedfordshire Rifle volunteer Corps: redesignated 3rd Volunteer Battalion in 1887

In 1900, the 4th (Huntingdonshire) Volunteer Battalion was raised.

Under the Territorial and Reserve Forces Act 1907 the reserve battalions were reorganised in 1908:

- The two militia battalions were renamed as the 3rd (Reserve) and 4th (Extra Reserve) Battalions.
- The 1st and 2nd Volunteer Battalions were merged to form The Hertfordshire Battalion (Territorial Force)
- The 3rd and 4th VBs became the 5th Battalion (TF)

The following year, the Hertfordshire Battalion left the regiment to become the 1st Battalion The Hertfordshire Regiment.

==== Service 1881–1914 ====
On formation, the 1st Battalion the Bedfordshire Regiment was stationed at Newry in Ireland, while the 2nd was in India. The 1st Battalion remained on home service in England and Malta until 1889, when it sailed for India. In 1895, it formed part of the force that took part in the Relief of Chitral. The battalion left India in 1907, arriving in England via Aden in the following year. In 1913, it was posted to Mullingar in Ireland.

The 2nd Battalion served in India and Burma until 1891 when it returned to England, moving to Dublin in 1898. From there it moved to South Africa in 1900, taking part in the Second Boer War. In 1903, it returned to England and moved to the Imperial fortress of Gibraltar in 1907, the Imperial fortress of Bermuda in 1910, and to South Africa in 1912.

The 4th (Militia) Battalion was embodied in January 1900, and a contingent of 500 officers and men embarked the SS Goorkha the following month for service in South Africa, taking part in the Second Boer War. Lieutenant-colonel Lord Cranborne was in command. Most of the battalion returned home on the SS Guelph in June 1902.

In 1908, the Volunteers and Militia were reorganised nationally, with the former becoming the Territorial Force and the latter the Special Reserve; the regiment now had two reserve battalions and one territorial battalion.

==== The First World War; 1914 – 1919 ====
The Bedfordshire Regiment was greatly expanded during the First World War and was engaged on the Western Front and the Middle East.

The 1st (Regular) Battalion was mobilised from garrison duty at Mullingar in Ireland in August 1914 and fought as part of the 15th Brigade 5th Division from the Battle of Mons in August 1914 to the Battle of the Sambre on 4 November 1918. The battalion served in every sector of the Western Front as well as in northern Italy, with Private Edward Warner winning a posthumous Victoria Cross on Hill 60 in May 1915.

The 2nd (Regular) Battalion was mobilised from garrison duty at Pretoria in South Africa and landed in Zeebrugge on 6 October 1914, with the 21st Brigade within the 'Immortal' 7th Division. It was engaged from the First Battle of Ypres in October 1914, through to the Battle of the Sambre (1918). It served entirely on the Western Front, with Captain Charles Calveley Foss winning the Victoria Cross during the Battle of Neuve Chapelle in March 1915.

The 3rd (Reserve) Battalion provided home defence in and around Felixstowe, Suffolk, and remained there throughout the war.

The 4th (Extra Reserve) Battalion was initially posted to the Felixstowe and Harwich garrisons but was mobilised in July 1916, joining the 63rd (Royal Naval) Division on the Western Front that month. It was engaged from the Battle of the Ancre in November 1916, to the Passage of the Grande Honnelle during the Hundred Days Offensives; its last shots being fired in anger on 10 November 1918. Acting Lieutenant-Colonel John Stanhope Collings-Wells won a posthumous Victoria Cross in March 1918 whilst commanding the battalion through the German Spring Offensive (Operation Michael).

The 5th (Territorial) Battalion was mobilised in August 1914 and, after providing home defence in East Anglia, sailed for Gallipoli in July 1915. It served in the 162nd Brigade, 54th (East Anglian) Division during the Gallipoli Campaign, and in Egypt and Palestine. Private Samuel Needham won the Victoria Cross in September 1918 but died from accidental gunshot wounds sustained after the armistice, on 4 November 1918. The 5th Battalion were redesignated as the 1st/5th Battalion on the formation of a 2nd/5th (Reserve) Battalion in 1914, which was supplemented by the 3rd/5th (Reserve) Battalion the following summer. Both reserve battalions remained on home defence duties in the U.K., finding and training drafts for the front line 1st/5th Battalion, until they were merged into a single reserve battalion in 1918. The 3rd/5th (Reserve) Battalion was disbanded in March 1919.

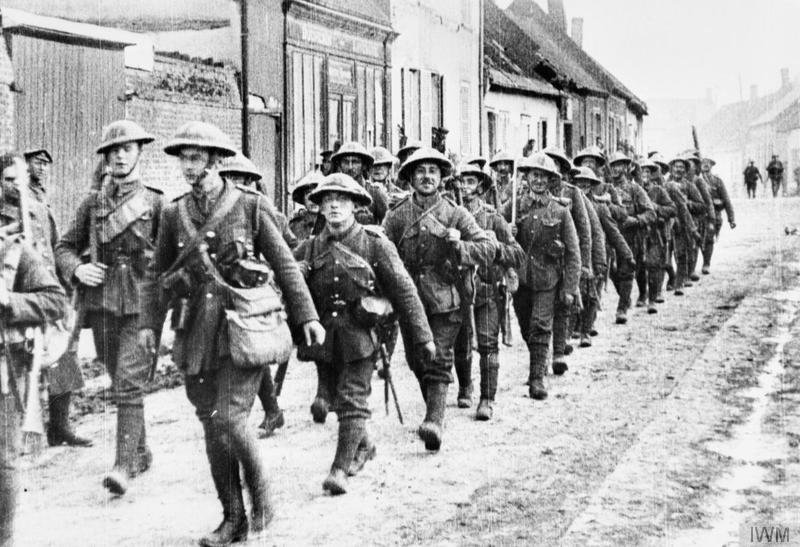
A platoon of 'D' Company of the 7th (Service) Battalion, Bedfordshire Regiment, passing through a French village on its way to the line, sometime in 1916. The officer at the head of his platoon is Lieutenant Douglas Keep, who was killed in action the following year.

Three 'service' battalions were raised to serve abroad, being the 6th, 7th and 8th battalions, in addition to the 9th and 10th (Service) Battalions who remained at home to find and train drafts for the combat units. These were formed around a nucleus of Regular and Reserve soldiers who trained the civilian recruits that flocked to form Kitchener's Army in 1914. The three battalions were raised as part of Kitchener's First, Second and Third New Armies respectively.

The 6th (Service) Battalion served on the Western Front in the 112th Brigade, 37th Division from July 1915 until disbanded in May 1918, when the men were folded into the 1st Battalion of the Hertfordshire Regiment. 2nd Lieutenant Frederick William Hedges from this battalion was awarded the Victoria Cross while attached to the 6th Battalion, Northamptonshire Regiment in October 1918.

The 7th (Service) Battalion served entirely on the Western Front in the 54th Brigade, 18th (Eastern) Division from July 1915 until it was disbanded in May 1918. 2nd Lieutenant Tom Edwin Adlam won the Victoria Cross during the battalion's assault against the Schwaben Redoubt in September 1916 and stretcher bearer Christopher Augustus Cox won the battalion's second Victoria Cross during operations opposite Achiet Le Grand in March 1917. When the battalion was reduced to a cadre in May 1918, the personnel were folded into the 2nd (Regular) Battalion, who took their place in the 18th Division.

The 8th (Service) Battalion initially served in the 71st Brigade 24th Division until it moved to the Western Front, when it was transferred to the 18th Brigade, 6th Division. One of the few New Army battalions to be committed to the Battle of Loos in September 1915, the battalion was disbanded in February 1918 and its personnel folded into the other Bedfordshire Regiment battalions on the Western Front.

The 9th (Service) later 9th (Reserve) Battalion was formed in October 1914 by the 3rd (Reserve) Battalion as part of 'K4' (Kitchener's 4th New Army), being absorbed into the rawest of 6th Reserve Brigade in August 1916.

The 10th (Service) later 10th (Reserve) Battalion was formed in December 1914 by the 4th (Extra Reserve) Bn, becoming the 27th (Training Reserve) Battalion in September 1916. October 1917 saw it redesignated as the 53rd (Young Soldier's) Battalion, who provided basic training for 18 year old conscripted men, which enabled them to be ready for foreign service once they became eligible. In February 1919 the battalion was designated as a Service Battalion and, alongside the 51st and 52nd (Graduated) Battalions, formed the 2nd Eastern Brigade of the Eastern Division. Collectively, this brigade was referred to as the Bedfordshire Brigade and served around Cologne, Germany, in the Army of Occupation (as part of the British Army of the Rhine).

The 11th (TF) Battalion was formed in December 1916 from the 68th (Provisional) Battalion and remained on home service in Suffolk until it was disbanded in July 1919.

In addition, the 12th and 13th (Transport Workers) Battalions were raised in 1916 and 1917 and the 1st, 2nd and 3rd Garrison Battalions served in India and Burma.

The Hertfordshire Regiment raised three further reserve battalions (the 2nd/1st, 3rd/1st and 4th/1st Battalions) and its front line 1st/1st Battalion served on the Western Front from November 1914 until 1919, with Corporal Alfred Alexander Burt and 2nd Lieutenant Frank Edward Young winning Victoria Crosses (posthumously) in 1915 and 1918 respectively. The 1st/1st Hertfordshires were attached to the 4th (Guards) Brigade on its arrival in France in 1914 and became known as the 'Herts Guards'. The nickname '2nd Micks' was also associated with them after their unflinching support of the 1st Battalion, Irish Guards' assault against the German position known as Brickstacks near Cuinchy in February 1915. The Irish Lieutenant-Colonel was so impressed with their behaviour, that he adopted them as his 2nd Battalion, as the Irish Guards were a single battalion regiment at the time.

=== The Bedfordshire and Hertfordshire Regiment (1919 – 1958) ===
==== Between the wars; 1919 – 1939 ====
In 1919, the regiment was renamed The Bedfordshire and Hertfordshire Regiment, in recognition of the service of men from Hertfordshire during the First World War. During 1919 the war-formed battalions were disbanded, and the special reserve battalions were placed in "suspended animation". In 1920 the Territorial Force was reconstituted as the Territorial Army. The inter-war battalions were:

- 1st Battalion
- 2nd Battalion
- 5th Battalion (TA)

The 1st Battalion was stationed in England until 1920 when it moved to Sligo and Boyle in Ireland. During their time in Ireland they were involved in a number of engagements with the IRA including, the Sheemore ambush and the Selton Hill ambush. They returning to England when the Irish Free State achieved independence in 1922. It was posted to Malta in 1925, to China in 1928, to India in 1929 and to Egypt in 1938. The 2nd Battalion was stationed in India from 1919 to 1925 and in Iraq from 1925 to 1926. It returned to England, from where it was dispatched to suppress the Arab revolt in Palestine in 1936. From Palestine it moved back to England in 1938.

==== The Second World War; 1939 – 1945 ====
The regiment was expanded for the duration of the Second World War:

- The 5th Battalion, a 1st Line Territorial Army unit, formed a 2nd Line duplicate, the 6th Battalion, in 1939 as another European conflict seemed inevitable and, as a result, the Territorial Army was doubled in size and each unit formed a duplicate.
- The 7th, 2/7th, 8th, 9th and 10th Battalions were all raised during the war, during the huge expansion of the British Army, and were used mainly to supply the other battalions of the regiment with trained infantrymen or for home defence.

Only the 1st, 2nd and 5th Battalions saw active service:

- The 1st Battalion was stationed in the Middle East with 14th Infantry Brigade, part of the 6th Division which later renumbered to the 70th Division. They moved to British India in 1942, after the Japanese entered the war, and subsequently served as Chindits in the Burma Campaign of 1944 where they, like many other Chindit units, suffered heavy casualties mainly from disease. The 1st Battalion saw no further part in the war.
- The 2nd Battalion formed part of the 10th Infantry Brigade, 4th Infantry Division. They were part of the British Expeditionary Force dispatched to France in September 1939, and evacuated from Dunkirk in 1940. They spent two years on home defence in the UK expecting a German invasion of England which never arrived. It took part later in the North African Campaign in 1941–42, the Tunisia Campaign in 1942–1943, the Italian Campaign in 1944 and the liberation of Greece in 1944–1945.
- The 5th Battalion was attached to the 55th Infantry Brigade, part of the 18th (East Anglian) Infantry Division formed part of the reinforcements dispatched to Malaya in early 1942. It surrendered to the Imperial Japanese Army with the Fall of Singapore and the men spent the rest of the war as POWs.

At the end of the war in 1945, the 1st Battalion was in British India and the 2nd in Greece. The 1st Battalion moved to Libya in 1947 and then to Greece, where civil war had broken out. The 2nd Battalion moved from Greece to Egypt in 1946, returning to the United Kingdom in 1947.

==== 1945 – 1958 ====
Following the disbanding of the war-formed units and the reconstitution of the Territorial Army in 1947, the regiment comprised the following battalions:

- 1st Battalion
- 2nd Battalion, which were absorbed into the 1st Battalion in 1948
- 5th Battalion (TA)

The 1st Battalion returned from Greece to England in early 1950, on board the well-known troopship HMT Empire Windrush. The Battalion moved to Cyprus the following year and to Egypt in 1952. In 1954, it returned to England for the final time, and was posted to Germany for the first time in 1956 where it remained until amalgamation.

=== Amalgamation into the 3rd East Anglian Regiment and the Royal Anglian Regiment ===
The size of the British Army was reduced following the publication of the 1957 Defence White Paper. A policy of grouping regiments in administrative brigades, and amalgamating pairs of regular battalions was inaugurated. Accordingly, the 1st Battalions of the Bedfordshire and Hertfordshire Regiment and the Essex Regiment were merged to form the 3rd East Anglian Regiment (16th/44th Foot) on 2 June 1958, which itself became part of a new "large regiment": the Royal Anglian Regiment in 1964. The regiment's modern lineage is continued directly by D Company, 2nd Battalion of The Royal Anglian Regiment.

==== Territorial units after amalgamation ====
Although the regular battalion was merged into the 3rd East Anglian Regiment in 1958, the Bedfordshire and Hertfordshire Regiment name continued in the Territorial Army for a further fourteen years. On formation of the 3rd East Anglians, the territorial battalion was redesignated as the 5th Battalion, The Bedfordshire Regiment (TA). A reduction in the size of the Territorial Army in May 1961 saw the 5th Bedfords merge with the 1st Battalion, The Hertfordshire Regiment to form The Bedfordshire and Hertfordshire Regiment (TA). This regiment was disbanded in 1967, with its successor units in the new Territorial Army and Volunteer Reserve being the 5th (Volunteer) Battalion, the Royal Anglian Regiment and The Bedfordshire and Hertfordshire Regiment (Territorials). The latter unit was a home defence unit, reduced to an eight-man cadre in 1969 and eventually forming part of the 7th (Volunteer) Battalion, Royal Anglian Regiment in 1971.

== Badges and dress distinctions ==
When the regiment was formed in 1881 the badges of the 16th Foot and Hertfordshire Militia were combined. The badge for the full dress helmet plate featured a Maltese cross superimposed on an eight-pointed star, in the centre of which was a hart (a male deer) crossing a ford. A similar design was used for the cap badge adopted in 1898, with the addition of a representation of the Garter around the central device, and a scroll with the regiment's title. The collar badge was also the hart in a ford.

As the 16th Regiment of Foot, the regiment initially had white facings on the lapels, cuffs and lining of the red coats of the early 18th century. Yellow was subsequently adopted at an unknown date before the publication of the official Clothing Book of 1742. In 1881, the newly renamed Bedfordshire Regiment was allocated the standard white facings of non-royal English line infantry regiments. In other respects the regiment followed the normal progression of the British infantry from red coats, to scarlet tunics, to khaki service dress and battledress. Officers had silver lace on their coats until 1830, after which gold braiding was adopted.

The regiment wore a black and primrose lanyard on the battle-dress blouse. The lanyard was later worn by territorial units of the Royal Anglian Regiment based in the former regimental area.

== Regimental museum ==
The Bedfordshire and Hertfordshire Regiment gallery is part of Wardown Park Museum in Luton.

== Battle honours ==
When the regiment was formed in 1881, it was unique in having no battle honours to display on its colours, as the 16th Foot had never received such an award in spite of having served for nearly 200 years and having been engaged almost constantly in Europe during the first few decades of its existence. A committee was assembled in 1882 under the chairmanship of Major General Sir Archibald Alison to review the award of honours, and the Bedfordshire Regiment received honours for four battles under the command of the Duke of Marlborough fought at the beginning of the eighteenth century. The regiment subsequently received awards for past services in 1897 (for Surinam in 1804) and 1910 (for Namur in 1695). To these were added contemporary honours for fighting in the North West Frontier Province and the Second Boer War. The regiment had been derisively known as "The Peacemakers" and the "Thou Shalt Not Kill Regiment". As late as 1912, this was to result in the death of a Private MacMasters of the Scots Guards after he used the latter when addressing Private Lovell and Private Wright of the Bedfordshire Regiment in the street and was punched in the jaw by Wright, falling down dead. The regiment was awarded more than 70 honours for service in the First World War in 1925, and 18 for the Second World War in 1957. In common with other regiments, ten honours from each war were selected to be borne on the queen's colour. The regiment's selected battle honours were as follows:

- Early wars:
  - Namur 1695, Blenheim, Ramillies, Oudenarde, Malplaquet, Surinam, Chitral, South Africa 1900–02
- The First World War:
  - Mons, Marne 1914, Ypres 1914 '15 '17, Loos, Somme 1916 '18, Cambrai 1917 '18, Sambre, France and Flanders 1914–1918, Suvla, Gaza.
- Second World War:
  - Dunkirk 1940, North West Europe 1940, Tobruk Sortie, Belhamed, Tunis, North Africa 1941 '43, Cassino II, Trasimene Line, Italy 1944–45, Chindits 1944.

== Colonels ==
The Colonels of the regiment were as follows:

- 1688: Archibald Douglas
- 1688–1692: Robert Hodges
- 1692–1705: Honourable James Stanley: Earl of Derby from 1702
- 1705–1711: Francis Godfrey
- 1711–1712: Brigadier General Henry Durell (died 1 December 1712)
- 1713–1715: Brigadier-General Hans Hamilton (appointed 23 June 1713)
- 1715–1717: Rich Ingram, 5th Viscount of Irvine
- 1717–1724: James Cholmeley
- 1724–1730: Henry Scott, 4th Earl of Deloraine
- 1730–1763: Roger Handasyd

=== 16th Regiment of Foot ===
- 1763–1765: Hon. Robert Brudenell
- 1765–1766: Col Sir William Draper KB
- 1766–1778: Lt-Gen James Gisbourne
- 1778–1788: Lt-Gen James Robertson

=== 16th (Buckinghamshire) Regiment ===
- 1788–1797: Lt-Gen Hon. Thomas Bruce
- 1797–1808: Gen Henry Bowyer
- 1808–1814: Gen Sir Charles Green, Bt

=== 16th (Bedfordshire) Regiment ===
- 1814–1816: Lt-Gen Sir George Prevost, Bt
- 1816–1823: Lt-Gen Hugh Mackay Gordon
- 1823–1854: William Beresford, 1st Viscount Beresford GCB GCH
- 1854–1857: Lt-Gen Sir Thomas Erskine Napier KCB CB
- 1857–1858: Major-Gen Cecil Bisshopp CB
- 1858–1863: Gen Sackville Hamilton Berkeley
- 1863–1883: Lt-Gen George MacDonald

=== The Bedfordshire Regiment ===
- 1883–1890: Gen. Edward Stopford Claremont CB
- 1890–1892: Gen. Frederick Robert Elrington CB
- 1892–1893: Gen. Sir William Payn KCB
- 1893–1900: Lt-Gen. Sir John William Cox KCB
- 1900–1903: Lt-Gen. William Charles Bancroft
- 1903–1909: Lt-Gen. Hon. John Thomas Dalyell
- 1909–1914: Major-Gen. Reginald Laurence Herbert Curteis
- 1914–1928: Major-Gen. Thomas David Pilcher CB, TD

=== The Bedfordshire and Hertfordshire Regiment ===
- 1928–1935: F.M. Frederick Rudolph Lambart, 10th Earl of Cavan, KP, GCB, GCMG, CGVO, GBE
- 1935–1948: Gen Sir Henry Cholmondeley Jackson, KCB, CMG, DSO, DL
- 1948–1958: Lt-Gen Sir Reginald Francis Stewart Denning KCVO, KBE, CB

== Regimental traditions ==
- The regimental march is 'La Mandolinata', a lively piece originally taken from an Italian Opera of the 1870s and adapted to suit a regimental march.
- Blenheim Day is celebrated every August, in remembrance of the regiment's forebears' part in The Battle of Blenheim.
- From 18 February 1938 Queen Elizabeth The Queen Mother was the honorary Colonel in Chief of the Regiment, her patronage later passing to the Royal Anglian Regiment after amalgamation.
- On the first Sunday after Remembrance Sunday every year, a regimental Remembrance service and parade is held outside The Keep at Kempston Barracks.

== Sources ==
- Beckett, Ian (2003). Discovering English County Regiments. Shire. ISBN 978-0-7478-0506-9.
- Cannon, Richard (1848). Historical Record of the Sixteenth or Bedfordshire Regiment of Foot: containing an account of the formation of the regiment in 1688, and its subsequent services to 1848. Historical records of the British Army. London: HMSO.
- Farmer, John S (1901). The Regimental Records of the British Army: a historical résumé chronologically arranged of titles, campaigns, honours, uniforms, facings, badges, nicknames, etc. London: Grant Richards.
- Sainsbury, J.D. (1969). Hertfordshire's Soldiers. Echo Press.
- Swinson, Arthur (1972). A Register of the Regiments and Corps of the British Army. London: The Archive Press. ISBN 0-85591-000-3.
- Wickes, H L (1974). Regiments of Foot: A History of the Foot Regiments of the British Army. Reading, Berkshire: Osprey Publishing. ISBN 0-85045-220-1.
