= Sars-la-Bruyère Castle =

Fortified building in Wallonia, Belgium

Coordinates: 50.374°N 3.879°E

- Wallonia, Belgium
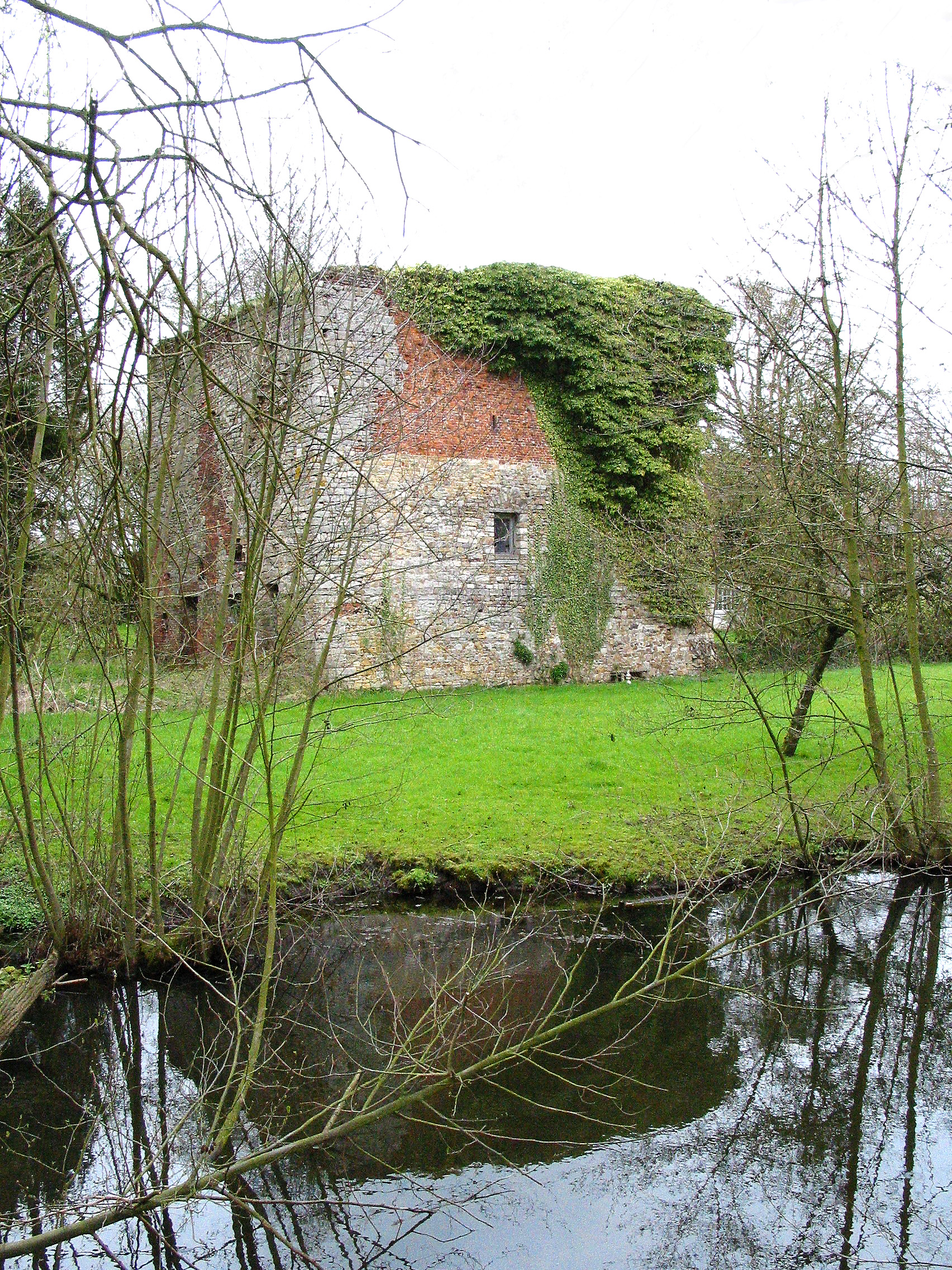
- Ruins of the 13th century donjon

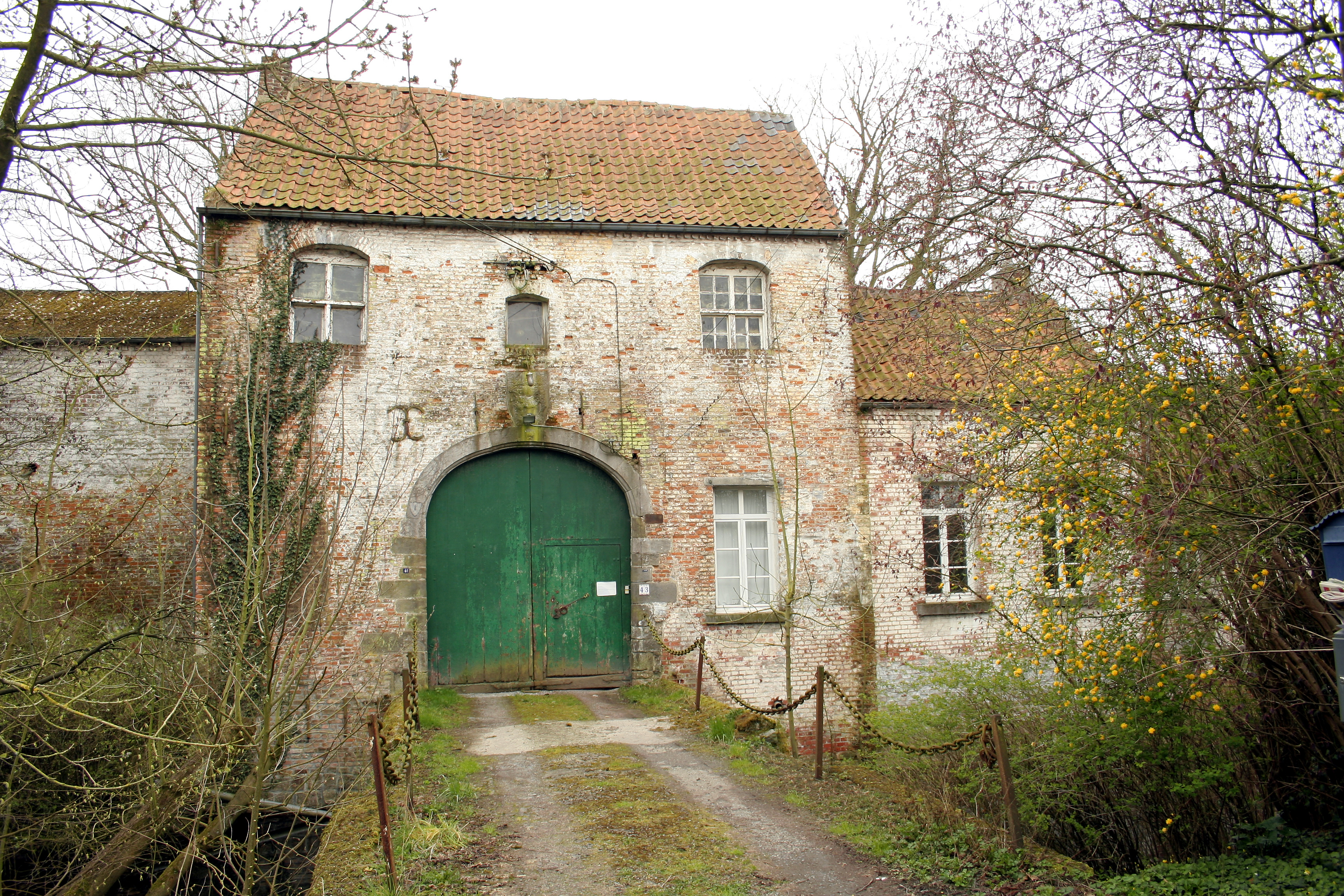
- Rebuild, 17th/18th centuries

Site information
- Type: Château-ferme

Sars-la-Bruyère Castle (French: Château or Château-ferme de Sars-la-Bruyère, also known as Château-ferme de la Poterie) is a château-ferme, or fortified farmhouse, in Sars-la-Bruyère in the municipality of Frameries, province of Hainaut, Wallonia, Belgium.

The ruins of the 13th century donjon remain, but the greater part of the château was rebuilt in the 18th and 19th centuries.

== See also ==
- List of castles in Belgium
