= Sheemore ambush =

Ambush during the Irish War of Independence

- Part of the Irish War of Independence
Date	4 March 1921
Location	Sheemore, County Leitrim 53.992°N 7.998°W
Result	IRA victory

Belligerents
Irish Republican Army (South Leitrim Brigade)	(United Kingdom of Great Britain and Ireland) British Army (United Kingdom of Great Britain and Ireland) Royal Irish Constabulary

Commanders and leaders
Seán Mitchel	(United Kingdom of Great Britain and Ireland); Lieutenant Eric Chilver Wilson

Strength
7 volunteers	30–40

Casualties and losses
None	1 confirmed killed 6 wounded
- Location within island of Ireland

The Sheemore ambush was an ambush carried out by the Irish Republican Army (IRA) on 4 March 1921, during the Irish War of Independence. It took place at Sheemore near Carrick-on-Shannon, County Leitrim.

The ambush was carried out by the IRA's South Leitrim Brigade on a British Army and Auxiliary Division convoy. The British force suffered casualties and admitted one fatality, a captain in the Bedfordshire Regiment, although some local sources claimed several more were killed. The Black and Tans later undertook reprisals in Carrick-on-Shannon, including burning the Temperance Hall in Gowel.

== Ambush ==
On Friday morning 4 March 1921, as the congregation made their way out of the 'First Friday Mass' in the Roman Catholic parish church in Gowel, they were met by three lorries carrying 30–40 Auxiliaries, Royal Irish Constabulary (RIC), and British Army members. The men were lined up for searching on one side while a 'female searcher' attended to the women. There was no panic and as nothing was found, there were no arrests. The church had been identified as a likely place for volunteers of the IRA's South Leitrim Brigade to attend. Father Edward O’Reilly (the church's curate) was openly friendly towards the volunteers. After they searched the church interior, the police and soldiers remounted their lorries and continued back to Carrick-on-Shannon.

About 2km down the road, on the slopes of Sheemore, volunteers of the South Leitrim Brigade awaited them. The day before, the Brigade had received word from Joe Nangle (Drumshanbo) of the British operation. They took up position behind a low wall which ran on the brink of an eighty-foot-high rock face on the side of Sheemore. It was four hundred yards from the road. There were seven volunteers – Brigadier Seán Mitchel (who was in command), Charles E. McGoohan (from Ballinamore), Michael Geoghegan (from Aughacashel), Mattie Boylan (from Carrick-on-Shannon), Michael Martin (from Ballinamore), Joe Nangle and Harry McKeon.

At the command from Mitchell, the IRA opened fire on the convoy. The members of the convoy jumped from their lorries, and took cover behind a wall which ran along the road. The police ran despite the shouts from the soldiers to stand their ground. The officer in command tried to use field glasses to spot the positions of the IRA. After a forty-five-minute gunfight the IRA withdrew, and the British made no attempt to follow them. Instead they gathered up their casualties and returned to Carrick-on-Shannon.

Contemporary newspaper reports indicate that one officer and four men or the Bedfordshire Regiment were wounded, as were two members of the RIC. The British officer died the following day (Saturday 5 March 1921), and some people reportedly left the area for fear of reprisals.

The 'female searcher' (Nurse Alice Grey or Gray), who was a member of the ambushed convoy, was recognised by the British authorities for her role in the incident.
