= Bouzincourt =

- Commune
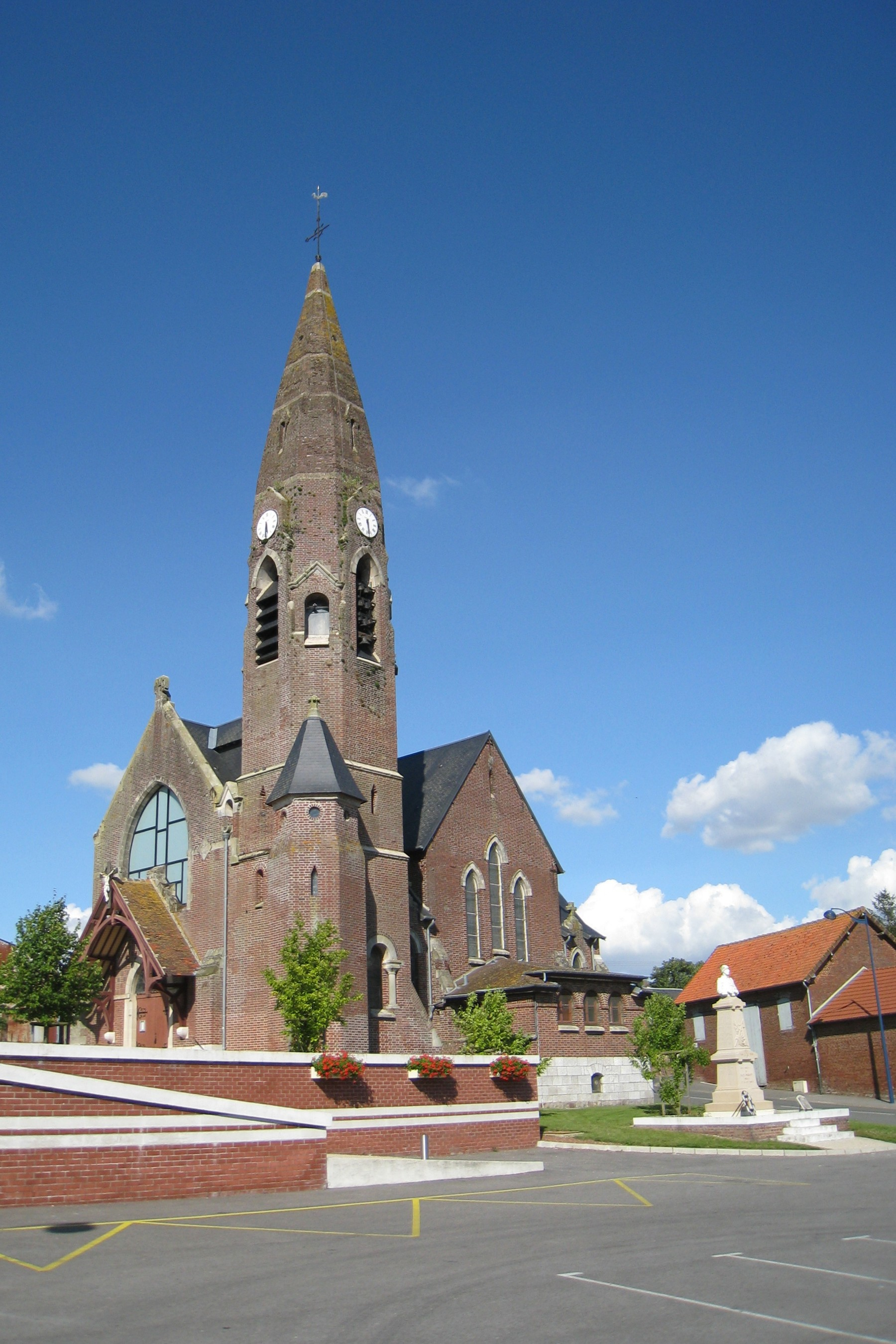
- The church in Bouzincourt
- Location of Bouzincourt
- Location within France Location within Hauts-de-France
- Coordinates: 50°01′38″N 2°36′45″E
- Country: France
- Region: Hauts-de-France
- Department: Somme
- Arrondissement: Péronne
- Canton: Albert
- Intercommunality: Pays du Coquelicot

Government
  - Mayor (2020–2026): Michel Letesse
- Area^{1}: 8.11 km^{2} (3.13 sq mi)
- Elevation: 106 m (348 ft)
- Highest elevation: 134 m (440 ft)
- Lowest elevation: 67 m (220 ft)
- Population (2023): 528
  - Density: 65.1/km^{2} (169/sq mi)
- Time zone: UTC+01:00 (CET)
  - Summer (DST): UTC+02:00 (CEST)
- INSEE/Postal code: 80129 /80300
- ^{1} French Land Register data, which excludes lakes, ponds, glaciers > 1 km^{2} (0.386 sq mi or 247 acres) and river estuaries.

Bouzincourt (French pronunciation: [buzɛ̃kuʁ]) is a commune in the Somme department in Hauts-de-France in northern France.

The name Bouzincourt is derived from the words for forest (bosquet) and the typical Picardy village suffix '-court' . It was therefore a wooded village.

== Geography ==
Bouzincourt is situated on the junction of the D938 and D20 roads, some 18 miles (29 km) northeast of Amiens.

== Places of interest ==
The church of St. Honore was destroyed during World War I but reconstructed in 1920 in the shape of a bullet. The tower is 36m high. The stained-glass windows were restored by l'École de Nancy, and are worthy of attention.

The ‘muches’ are man-made tunnels where the population hid during times of war.

The Bouzincourt Ridge Cemetery, which commemorates 709 soldiers from World War I, is located east of the village. It was designed by British architect Reginald Blomfield.

== Population ==
Historical population
| Year | Pop. | ±% p.a. |
|---|---|---|
| 1968 | 564 | — |
| 1975 | 537 | −0.70% |
| 1982 | 580 | +1.11% |
| 1990 | 535 | −1.00% |
| 1999 | 511 | −0.51% |
| 2007 | 511 | +0.00% |
| 2012 | 548 | +1.41% |
| 2017 | 550 | +0.07% |
| 2023 | 528 | −0.68% |
Source: INSEE

== See also ==
- Communes of the Somme department
