= Caddington Hall =

Country estate in Bedfordshire, England

Coordinates: 51.8439°N 0.4520°W

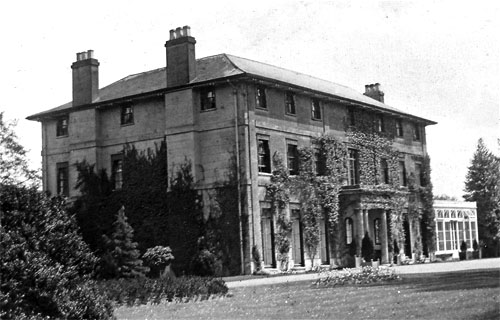
Caddington Hall, demolished 1975

Caddington Hall was a country estate in Markyate, Bedfordshire, England. The house was demolished in 1975.

In 1804, a family by the name of Pedley traded their farm for the estate, where a small house had stood. They tore it down and built Caddington Hall.
