= Bouzincourt Ridge Cemetery =

WWI CWGC cemetery in Somme, France

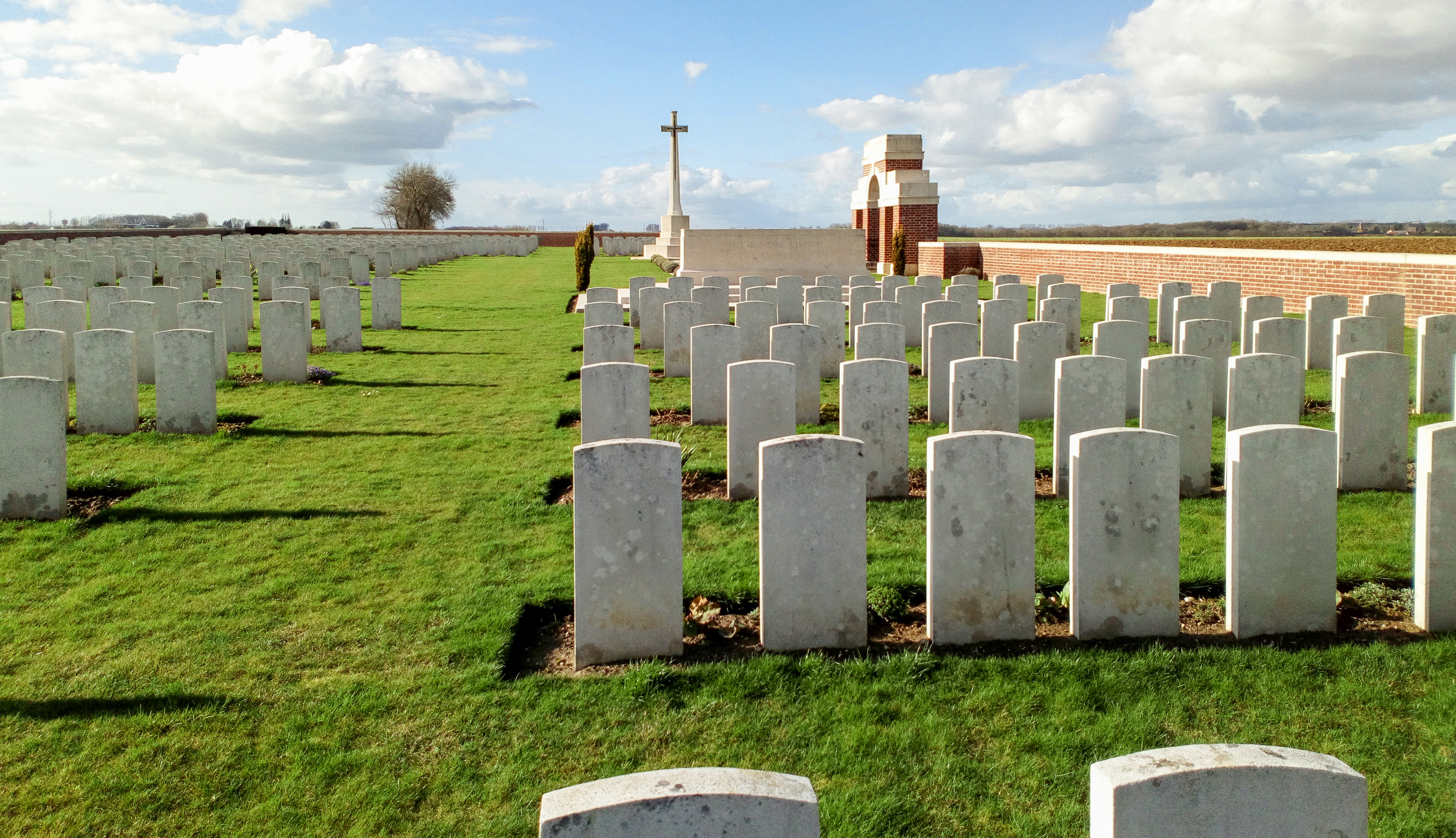

Details
- Established: September 1918
- Location: Bouzincourt, Somme, France
- Country: British and Commonwealth
- Coordinates: 50.02197°N 2.6372°E
- Type: Military
- Owned by: Commonwealth War Graves Commission
- No. of graves: 709 total, 313 unidentified
- Website: cwgc.org
- Find a Grave: Bouzincourt Ridge Cemetery

The Bouzincourt Ridge Cemetery is a military cemetery located in the Somme region of France commemorating British and Commonwealth soldiers who fought in World War I. The cemetery contains mainly those who died capturing the village of Bouzincourt between June and August 1918 and those who died on the front line near Bouzincourt.

== Location ==
The cemetery is located to the east of the village of Bouzincourt, approximately 3 kilometers northwest of Albert, France on the D938 road.

== Establishment of the Cemetery ==
The cemetery was started in the first week of September 1918 by the British V Corps, mainly for soldiers from the 12th and 18th Divisions who had died during the capturing Bouzincourt the two months prior (June - August 1918). After the end of the war, more plots were added to house approximately 500 more soldiers who were moved in from the surrounding area. The cemetery was designed by Sir Reginald Blomfield and Arthur James Scott Hutton.

=== Statistics ===
The cemetery covers an area of 2480 square meters, and contains a total of 709 burials, of which 396 are identified and 313 are unidentified. There exists a special memorial for an officer of the British 38th Division who is believed to be buried among the unknown.

Identified Burials by Nationality
Nationality	Number of Burials
United Kingdom	370
Australia	24
Canada	2
Total	396

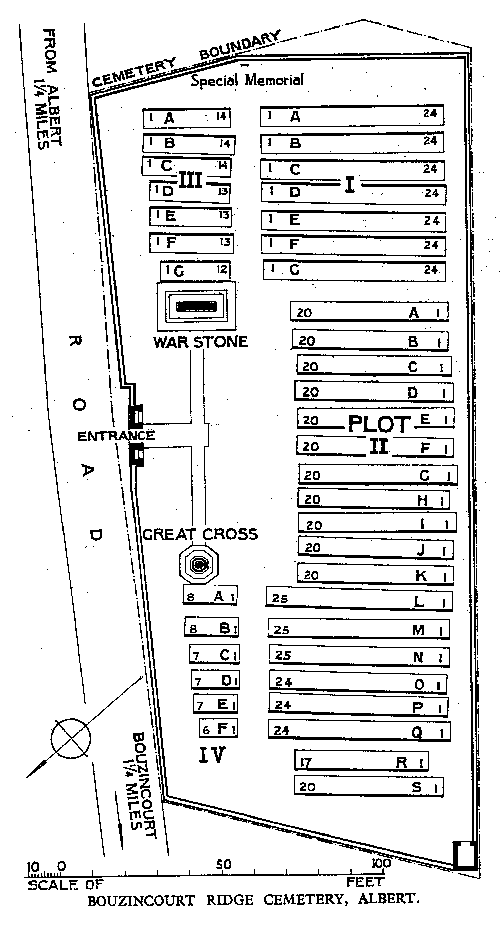
Bouzincourt Ridge Cemetery Plan

Number of Burials by Unit
Unit	#	Unit	#
Royal Welsh Fusiliers	115	East Yorkshire Regiment	34
Royal Sussex Regiment	30	Queen's - Royal West Surrey Regiment	29
Australian burials	24	Royal West Kent Regiment	22
Royal Berkshire Regiment	15	Royal Fusiliers - City of London Regiment Regiment	14
Northamptonshire Regiment	13	Buffs - East Kent Regiment	12
Bedfordshire Regiment	10	Royal Engineers	8
East Surrey Regiment	6	Suffolk Regiment	6
London Regiment - 23rd Battalion	5	Machine Gun Corps	5
West Yorkshire Regiment	5	London Regiment - 18th Bn. London Irish Rifles	4
Notts. & Derbys Regiment	4	Durham Light Infantry	3
Loyal North Lancashire Regiment	3	Rifle Brigade	3
Canadian burials	2	Lancashire Fusiliers	2
Norfolk Regiment	2	Royal Navy Division	2
South Wales Borderers	2	Cameronians - Scottish Rifles	1
Cheshire Regiment	1	Dorsetshire Regiment	1
Essex Regiment	1	King's Own Royal Lancaster Regiment	1
King's Royal Rifle Corps	1	London Regiment - 5th Bn. London Rifle Brigade	1
London Regiment - 7th Bn.	1	London Regiment - 11th Bn. Finsury Rifles	1
London Regiment - 19th Bn. St. Pancras	1	London Regiment - 20th Bn. Blackheath & Woolwich	1
Northumberland Fusiliers	1	Royal Army Medical Corps	1
Royal Field Artillery	1	Royal Irish Fusiliers	1
Royal Warwickshire Regiment	1		
