= 20th (Service) Battalion, King's Royal Rifle Corps (British Empire League Pioneers) =

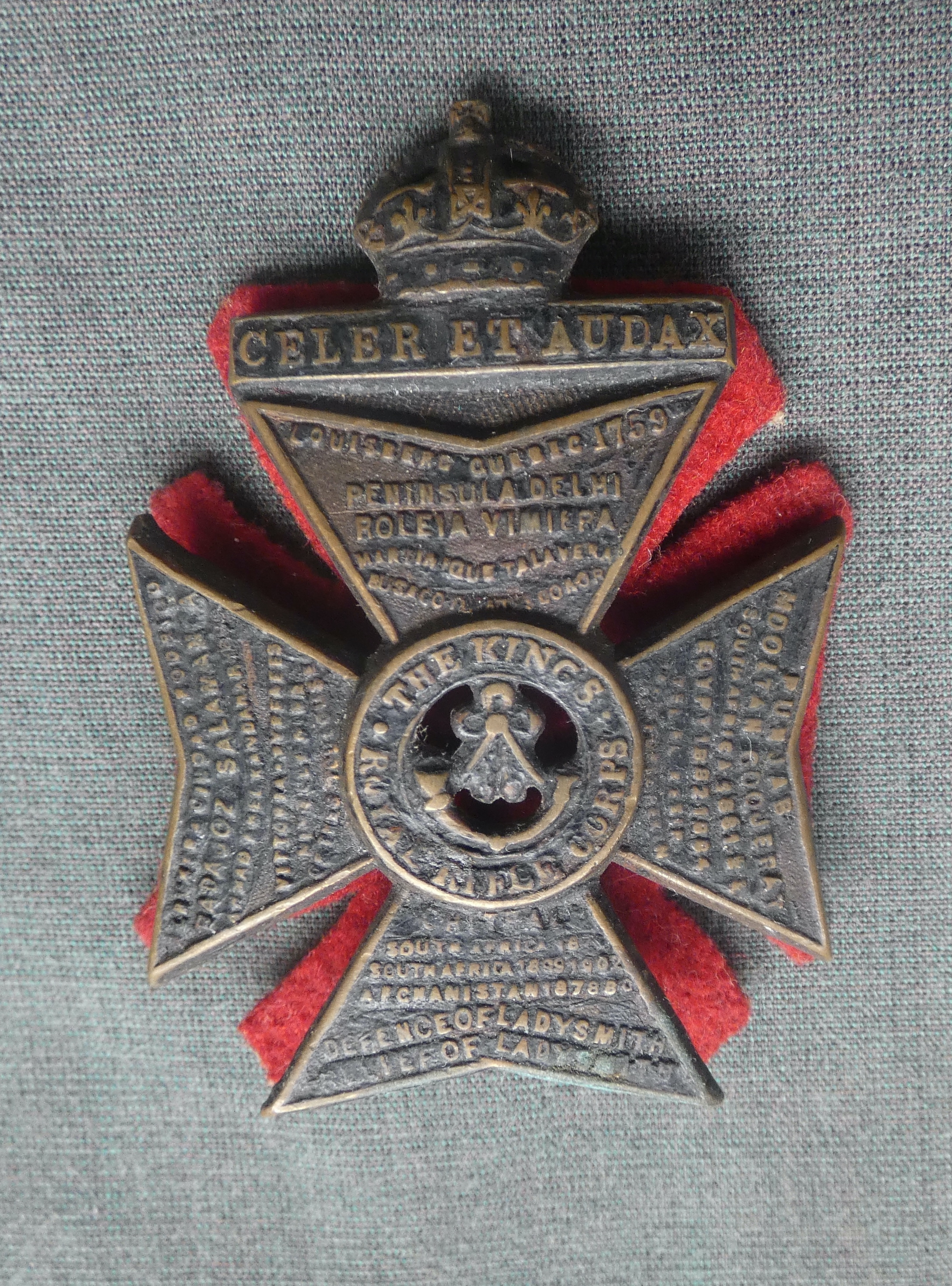
- Cap badge of the King's Royal Rifle Corps
- Active: 20 August 1915–9 February 1920
- Allegiance: United Kingdom
- Branch: New Army
- Type: Pals battalion
- Role: Pioneers
- Size: One Battalion
- Part of: 3rd Division
- Patron: British Empire League
- Engagements: Battle of the Somme; Battle of the Ancre; Battle of Arras; Battle of Passchendaele; German spring offensive Hundred Days Offensive

The 20th (Service) Battalion, King's Royal Rifle Corps (British Empire League Pioneers) ('20th KRRC' or 'XX KRRC') was an infantry pioneer unit recruited as part of 'Kitchener's Army' in World War I. It was raised in London in the summer of 1915 by the British Empire League. It served on the Western Front from March 1915 as the pioneer battalion of 3rd Division, seeing action at the Battles of the Somme and Ancre. Later it fought at Arras and Ypres, against the German spring offensive, and in the final Hundred Days Offensive, before taking part in the Allied occupation of the Rhineland.

== Recruitment and training ==
Alfred Leete's recruitment poster for Kitchener's Army.

On 6 August 1914, less than 48 hours after Britain's declaration of war, Parliament sanctioned an increase of 500,000 men for the Regular British Army. The newly appointed Secretary of State for War, Earl Kitchener of Khartoum, issued his famous call to arms: 'Your King and Country Need You', urging the first 100,000 volunteers to come forward. Men flooded into the recruiting offices and the 'first hundred thousand' were enlisted within days. This group of six divisions with supporting arms became known as Kitchener's First New Army, or 'K1'. The K2, K3 and K4 battalions, brigades and divisions followed soon afterwards. But the flood of volunteers overwhelmed the ability of the Army to absorb them, and the K5 units were largely raised by local initiative rather than at regimental depots, often from men from particular localities or backgrounds who wished to serve together: these were known as 'Pals battalions'. The 'Pals' phenomenon quickly spread across the country, as local recruiting committees offered complete units to the War Office (WO). One such organisation was the British Empire League (BEL), which advocated unity for the British Empire and had previously raised troops for service in the Second Boer War. From a headquarters (HQ) at Norfolk House, Laurence Pountney Hill, in the City of London, the League raised the 17th (Service) Battalion, King's Royal Rifle Corps (British Empire League) in April 1915. It continued recruiting so that on 28 August it was able to form a second battalion as a pioneer unit, the 20th (Service) Battalion, [King's Royal Rifle Corps (2nd BEL Pioneers).

Pioneers were a new addition to the British Army in 1915. They were trained infantry soldiers, but their primary role was to carry out digging and construction at the direction of the Royal Engineers (RE). The men received additional pay and the battalion was equipped with the necessary tools and stores, with the extra transport to move them. The recruits to the new battalion began their drill in London's Green Park. On 10 September Temporary Major Eric Murray, originally an officer of the Royal Field Artillery, was transferred from the 17th KRRC (BEL) to command the new battalion with the rank of Temporary Lieutenant-Colonel, and on 22 October the temporary quartermaster of the 17th KRRC was transferred to become the adjutant of the 20th KRRC.

As recruits continued to come in, the battalion formed its four service companies and two depot companies by about September 1915. In February 1916 the service companies moved to Wellingborough in Northamptonshire, where they continued their training attached to 23rd Reserve Brigade. The battalion was now ordered to join the British Expeditionary Force (BEF) on the Western Front. On 27 March it left Wellingborough aboard three trains for Southampton Docks, where it embarked on the transports Rossetti and Marguerite. Having left harbour the ships had to return to anchor in the Solent due to bad weather in the English Channel, and the men from the Marguerite were sent ashore to a rest camp. After another failed attempt, the Rossetti finally reached Le Havre on 30 March and disembarked the first 10 officers, 212 other ranks (ORs) and the battalion transport. The remainder of the battalion (18 officers and 772 ORs) embarked on the King Edward that evening and arrived the following morning.

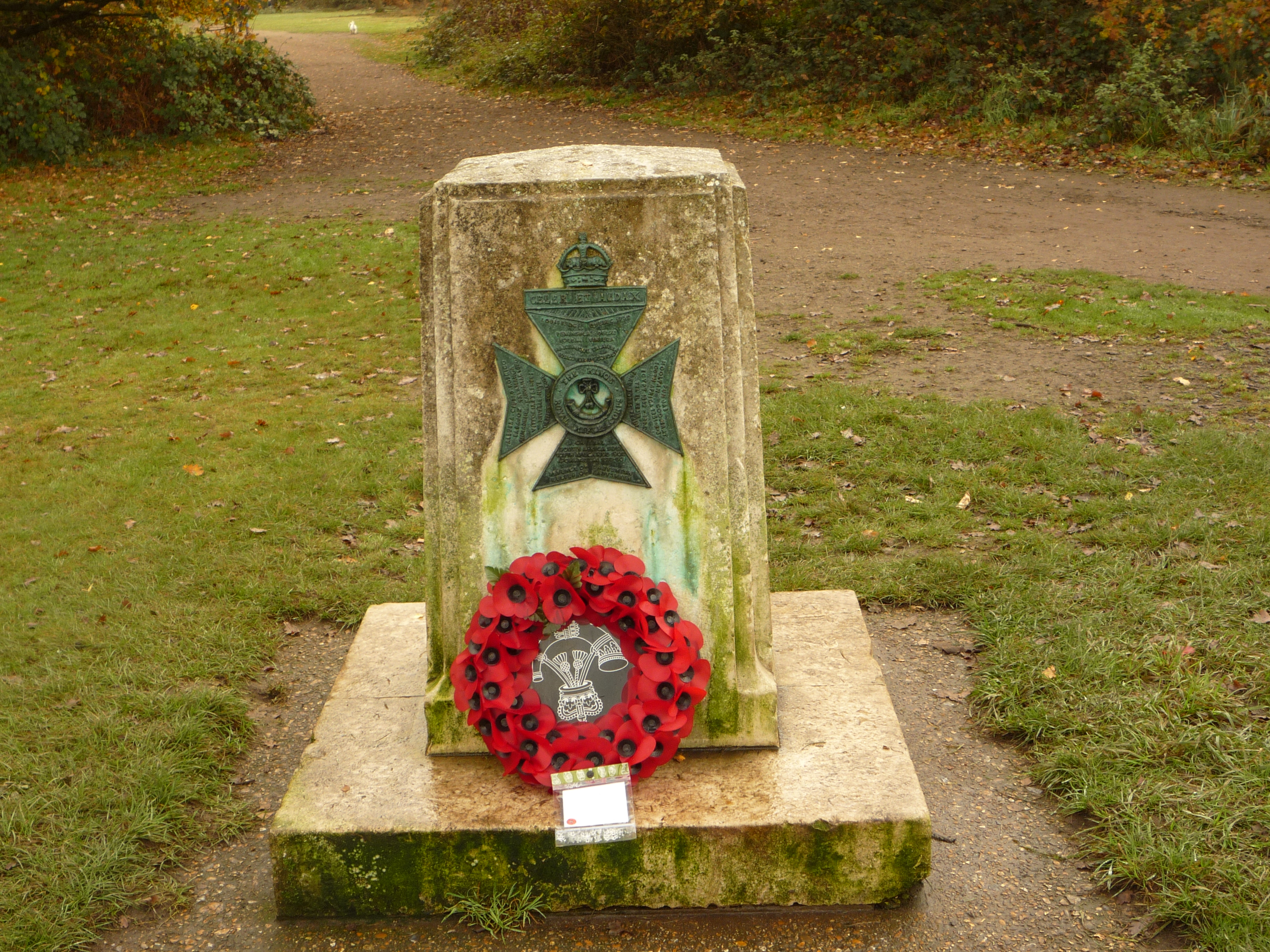

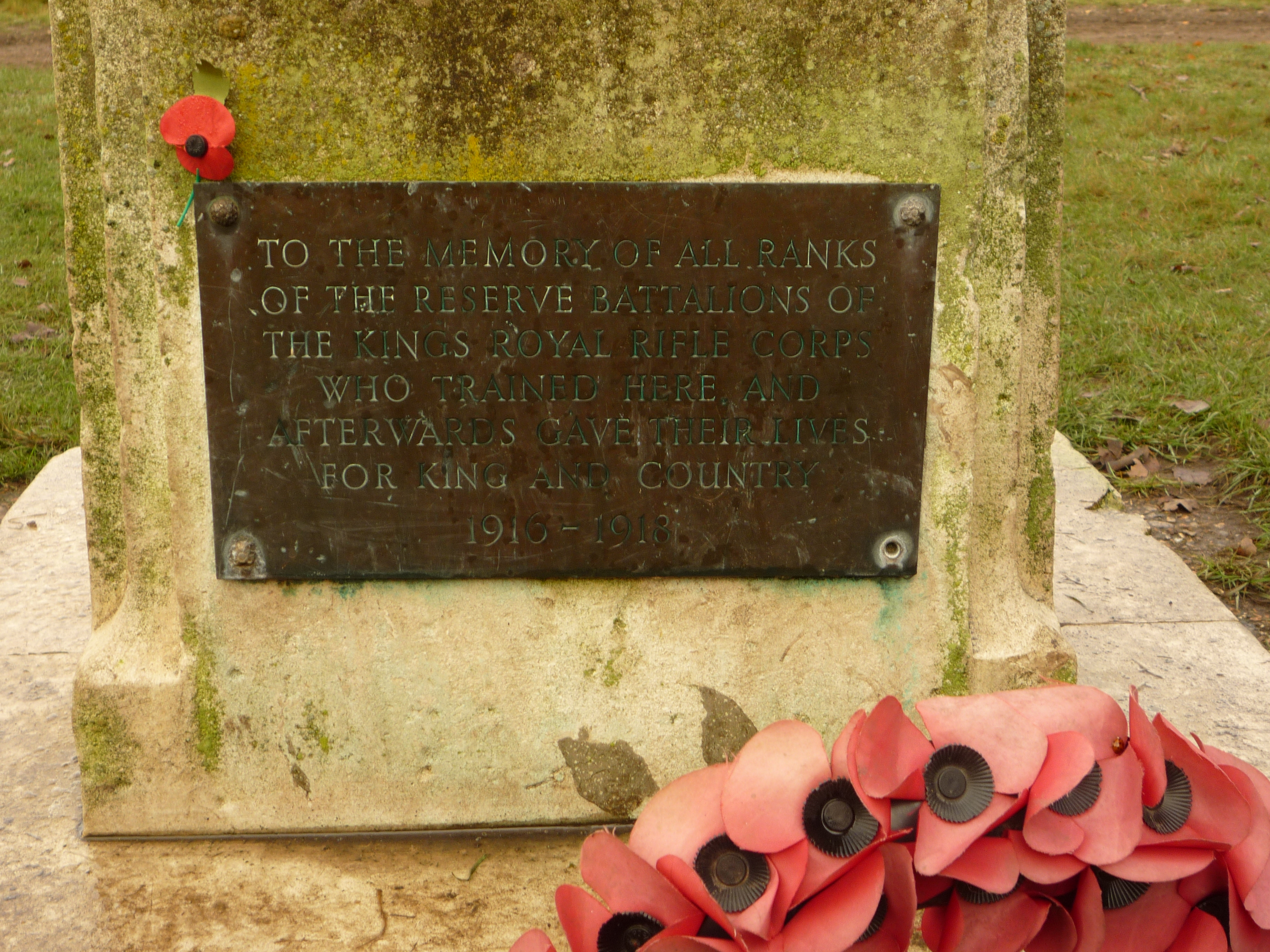
The memorial on Wimbledon Common to the 19th, 22nd and 23rd Reserve Battalions of the King's Royal Rifle Corps who trained there in 1916–18 as part of 26th Reserve Brigade.

=== 22nd (Reserve) Battalion ===
The depot companies of 20th KRRC became the 22nd (Reserve) Battalion, KRRC, and by October 1915 it was in the Andover area of Hampshire, as part of 24th Reserve Brigade. By February 1916 it was at Banbury in Oxfordshire with 26th Reserve Brigade. In June 1916 the brigade moved to Wimbledon Common where it spent the rest of the war training reinforcements for the service battalions of the KRRC. On 1 September 1916 the Training Reserve was established following the introduction of conscription, and 22nd (R) Bn KRRC became 110th Training Reserve Battalion, though the training staff retained their KRRC badges. The battalion was disbanded at Wimbledon on 2 March 1918.

== Service ==
After landing at Le Havre, the two parties of the battalion entrained and were reunited at Poperinge on 1 April, where the commanding officer (CO) reported to 20th (Light) Division HQ. Over the following days the companies were in the battle zone, draining trenches and repairing parapets, digging new communication trenches, improving an underground sap leading to a machine gun position, turning a shell hole into an observation post, laying out barbed wire and similar work, resulting in its first few casualties. After two weeks the battalion marched out to J Camp where it resumed training, particularly in musketry, though at first 20th Division could only supply 230 rifles for over 980 ORs, and later 500 dummy cartridges. The battalion started building a 30 yards (27 m) rifle range to use when more ammunition arrived. It also undertook pioneer training led by an RE Field Company. The training continued until 19 May when the battalion went by road to join 3rd Division. For the remainder of the war it was to be 3rd Divisional pioneer battalion.

=== Somme ===
For the rest of May and June, while two companies remained in camp to continue training, the other two were loaned to 6th Division for sandbagging and repairing front line trenches, and then three companies worked on a new support line. By the beginning of July all four companies were at work. The BEF's 'Big Push', the Battle of the Somme, was launched on 1 July. On 2–3 July 20 KRRC entrained for the south, and then carried out a march in several stages to reach the Somme sector, where 3rd Division took over a section of the front line on 8 July. The next day the battalion began building roads and bridges behind the lines as 3rd Division prepared to attack the German '2nd Position' in the Battle of Bazentin Ridge. The infantry of 8th and 9th Brigades silently deployed on tapes laid in No man's land during the night of 13/14 July. One company of 20th KRRC was attached to 8th Bde and one-and-a-half to 9th Bde, while the rest of the battalion was with 76th Bde in reserve in the old German trenches south of Montauban. When the infantry of 8th Bde had captured the German support line they and the REs were to consolidate the position. and construct strongpoints. The company of 20th KRRC with 8th Bde had the task of fortifying a position known as the 'Rectangle' by making strongpoints at each corner and wiring in between; they had a carrying party from 8th Bn East Yorkshire Regiment to help them. Rather than a prolonged artillery bombardment as had preceded the First Day of the Somme, the Battle of Bazentin Ridge began at 03.20 on 14 July with an intense surprise bombardment of the enemy positions. After 5 minutes the creeping barrage lifted forwards and the leading infantry advanced through the pre-dawn mist and reached the German wire before a shot was fired. On 8th Bde's front the two belts of wire had not been adequately cut by the artillery and the advance was held up, but 9th Bde got into the enemy front trench and a party bombed their way along it to clear 8th Bde's front while 9th Bde went on to attack Bazentin-le-Grand. The British had captured the ridge in one bound, capturing and killing many of the enemy (many more fleeing Germans would have been killed but for the poor British musketry) and the work of consolidation began during the morning. 20th KRRC's party with 9th Bde was relieved about 16.00, while the other party bivouacked overnight at the Rectangle.

The pioneers continued improving the new positions over the following days. They were under heavy shellfire and at the Rectangle work could only be done after dark. The other two companies, which had been doing some road work in the rear, took over the consolidation on 18 July, but had to stop for a while on 20 July when enemy shellfire became intense. Bitter fighting in the area (the Battle of Delville Wood) continued, 3rd Division attacking again on 23 July. One company of 20th KRRC spent the previous night digging a new trench, suffering several casualties on the way up and being unable to complete it by dawn. Two other companies left camp at 02.00 and came under the orders of 9th Bde. After the partial success of the attack, the whole battalion was ordered up to wire the new line. On the night of 24/25 July two parties were sent up to complete the work, but had to 'stand to' with their rifles under the orders of the nearest infantry officer during en enemy counter-attack. The following evening 3rd Division was relieved and the battalion withdrew for rest and training.

On 4 August 20 KRRC was ordered by XIII Corps HQ to send up two companies (the Right Half-Battalion) to work on defences under the Corps' Commander, RE (CRE) while the Left Half-Battalion continued training. The companies were changed over during the nights of 10–13 August, and then parties from the camp came under the command of 3rd Division's CRE for wiring and constructing dugouts. This work was directed by 183rd Tunnelling Company, RE, while other parties worked on constructing a tramway. 3rd Division went back into the line on the night of 14/15 August, ready to attack on 16 August. Apart from the party working with 183rd Tunnelling Co, all of 20th KRRC's men were taken off their work and concentrated in order to follow the attack and consolidate the ground captured. Guillemont had still not fallen, but the British were now at close assaulting distance; indeed, 'Lonely Trench' was too close to be bombarded by artillery and Stokes mortars had to be used. Zero hour was at 17.40 and the methodical bombardment suddenly increased to intense fire for 3 minutes before the infantry went in. 2nd Battalion Suffolk Regiment of 76th Bde cleared its objectives, despite enfilade fire from Lonely Trench, but the rest of 76th Bde and 9th Bde were stopped by fire from Lonely Trench, on which the mortars had made little impression. 20th KRRC's working party with 9th Bde was sent back, while those with 76th Bde lay out all night, finding it impossible to do any work. Next morning they began digging in. 3rd Division made another unsuccessful attack on Lonely Trench on 18 August and was then relieved during the night of 19/20 August. 20th KRRC still had 6 officers and 235 ORs working on dugouts. They went out next day to dig a communication trench under heavy shellfire, and it was not until 21 August that 20th KRRC was able to concentrate and march out.

The battalion undertook a series of marches, arriving at Philosophe on 31 August before moving to Mazingarbe on 3 September. 3rd Division was now in the Loos sector. Here the battalion supplied working parties for the divisional REs. B Company worked with 1st Cheshire Field Company on trench mortar emplacements, while C and D Companies worked on dugouts with 56th Fd Co. Meanwhile, A Company worked with 253rd Tunnelling Company, which was digging 'listening saps' out under No man's land. For this specialist work 20th KRRC found 20 miners from among its ranks, while the infantry battalions supplied another 20. This work continued until 21 September, when 3rd Division was pulled out to move to a training area. 20th KRRC left Mazingarbe on 23 September and went into billets at Enguinegatte. The battalion's training included physical training, bayonet fighting and musketry in addition to pioneer work. At the conclusion of the training 3rd Division carried out a practice attack on 4 October, with one pioneer company attached to each brigade to consolidate two 'keeps' each, and B Company held in reserve. Next day the division began the march back to the Somme, where Fifth Army was beginning the final operations of that year's offensive.

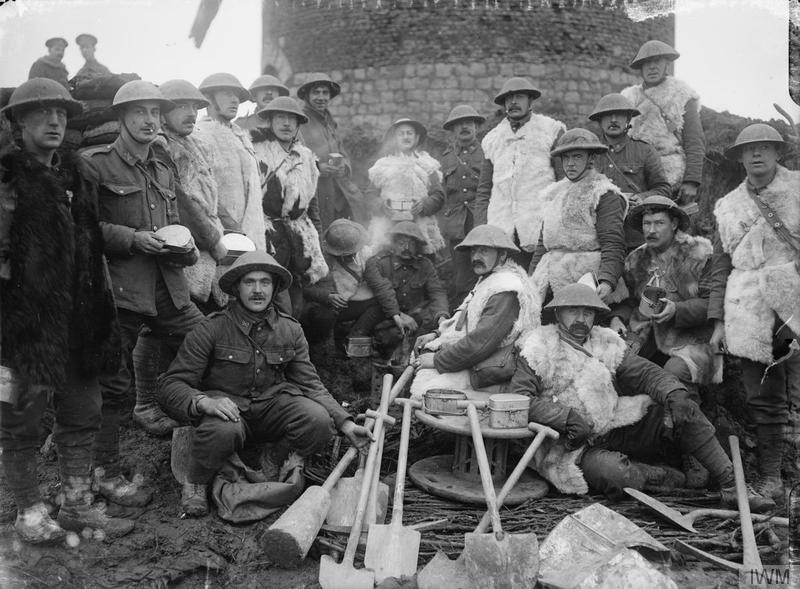
Men of a pioneer battalion on the Ancre, October 1916.

=== Ancre ===
3rd Division took over the line on 'Redan Ridge' on 5 October, and 20th KRRC arrived on 9 October, establishing battalion HQ at Mailly-Maillet, later at Courcelles. The companies were set to work: A Company and half of B Company under 1st East Riding Fd Co on dugouts in the north divisional sector; C Company and half of B Company under 1st Cheshire Fd Co on dugouts for the southern brigade; D Company under 56th Fd Co on the RE supply dump, reserve dugouts and tramways. Later in the month the battalion spent most of its efforts in trying to clear and drain the communication and front line trenches from which 3rd Division would have to attack, and to repair the roads, employing between 200 and 2000 infantry each day in extra working parties. The lateral trench known as 'Rob Roy' behind and downhill from the frontline trench had become a stream. On 23 October Lt-Col Murray was wounded and the second-in-command, Maj R. Inglis took over; he was later promoted to Lt-Col. Preparations for the attack continued. The attackers would be advancing over the same ground in front of Beaumont-Hamel and Serre that had been disastrously attacked on the First day on the Somme, but it was thought that the German powers of resistance had been reduced by the months of fighting since then and that a surprise attack might succeed. If the division succeeded in capturing Serre, B and C Companies of 20th KRRC were to consolidate the village while the other companies dug communication trenches from the heads of four existing British tunnels up to the German front line. 3rd Division attacked at 05.45 on 13 November (the Battle of the Ancre). Although the advance began in good order, the leading waves were soon wading through waist-deep mud trying to find gaps in the German wire. Some of 8th Bde got as far as the German support line but could not hold on; isolated parties from 76th Bde even got to the German reserve line but were wiped out there. A heavy German barrage in No man's land prevented the support battalions from crossing and by 06.30 the attack was over, with efforts turning to rescuing the exhausted men and bringing them back to the British front line. The pioneers of 20th KRRC stood by all day to begin their work; a platoon of D Company kept the tramway in 'Railway Hollow' running to evacuate casualties, making frequent repairs to shell damage, but otherwise they were unused.

Over the following days the battalion worked to keep the communication trenches and tramway usable, while 3rd Division suffered a heavy bombardment. The battle ended on 18 November, but 20th KRRC remained in this area for the next two months under dreadful conditions, continuing to clear communication trenches and laying drains to empty the frontline and Rob Roy trenches during the winter weather. It also built a dense apron of barbed wire, the 'Yellow Line', to protect the British positions.

=== Arras ===
20th KRRC finally moved away from Courcelles and the front lines on 7 January 1917 when 3rd Division was relieved, The pioneers went back to Candas and worked on the engineer and ammunition dumps in the area. Then on 28 January 20th KRRC began to move north by a series of marches to Arras, where the BEF was preparing its next offensive. Here the pioneers worked on communication trenches and dugouts in front of the town, building artillery roads and erecting huts for the incoming troops. They also did some work in the Arras tunnels, constructing entrances and facilities such as latrines.

The Arras Offensive began with the First Battle of the Scarpe on 9 April. 3rd Division launched its attack from Arras itself (many of the troops having been sheltering in the tunnels). Zero was at 05.30, before dawn, and the three brigades attacked in succession, passing through each other to capture a series of objectives, including the village of Tilloy, culminating in a long advance towards the Wancourt–Feuchy line, only being stopped 600 yards (550 m) short of that line. The following day the advance to the Wancourt–Feuchy was aided by a snowstorm blowing in the enemy's faces, but German resistance stiffened thereafter and progress slowed, 3rd Division failing to take Guémappe. During the first days of the battle, 20th KRRC was engaged in building a lorry track along the Cambrai Road from the German front line to 'Estaminet Corner', and an artillery track (making a Corduroy road in places) to get guns south of Tilloy. Although the fighting died down on 14 April the battalion continued working on the vital Cambrai Road until 22 April, and then moved forward into the trenches south of Tilloy on 23–24 April while 3rd Division fought in the Second Battle of the Scarpe. The battalion moved up with 76th Bde, but was sent back because of the lack of progress in the attack, and it spent the next few days improving and wiring 'Shrapnel Trench' under shellfire while the Battle of Arleux was fought, and then digging a communication trench from Shrapnel Trench up to the new front line. On 1 May it marched up to begin digging a proper front line trench, but the enemy had moved closer and made that impossible; D Company did however join up some shellholes to make about 400 yards (370 m) of assembly trench for the next attack. That came on 3 May (the Third Battle of the Scarpe). 20th KRRC moved up into trenches near Tilloy the night before, but the Germans were already alerted and deluged 3rd Division with high explosive and gas shells before Zero next morning. The attack failed and again 20th KRRC stood by all day without being employed. Over the following days the pioneers dug a new fire trench (or erected breastworks in places where trenching was impossible). 3rd Division's last action during the Arras offensive was an evening attack on 13 May. While most of the battalion spent the day clearing an old German communication trench, D Company was assigned to the attack and was rested beforehand. 76th Brigade carried out a surprise attack on the enemy front line ('Devil's Trench') but failed to establish a footing and was driven back, and D Company was unable to do its assigned work. 20th KRRC left the battle area and went back to 'Talavera Camp' on 14/15 May, and then into Arras, where 3rd Division was withdrawn to be Corps Reserve. From 22 May the battalion was at Liencourt undertaking infantry training.

On 2 June the battalion was taken by motor buses back to Tilloy, where it began working on the trenches around Monchy-le-Preux, captured during the recent fighting. It converted some into fire trenches facing the enemy, and dug new communication trenches. After further rest and training at Denier, the battalion moved into the devastated area left when the Germans retreated to the Hindenburg Line earlier in the year, and spent July and August wiring the new front and intermediate lines. In early September it moved to Bertincourt where it carried out drainage work, and then began training, with particular emphasis on musketry and bayonet fighting. It then moved by train and marching to the Ypres Salient, arriving on 22 September when 3rd Division entered the Flanders Offensive.

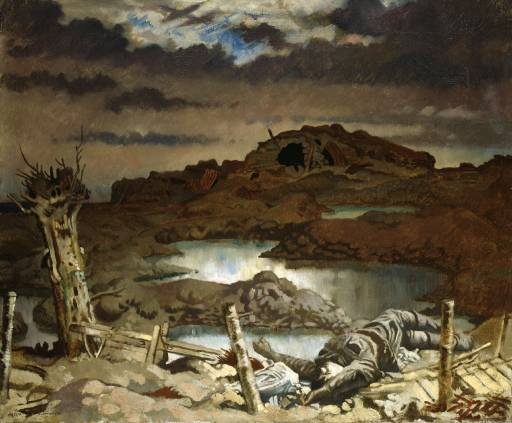
Zonnebeke by Sir William Orpen,depicting the devastation and flooding of the battlefield, crossed by a plank road.

=== Ypres ===
While the Battle of the Menin Road Ridge was being fought, 20th KRRC was making tracks for infantry and tanks, and tank bridges across trenches. 3rd Division played a leading part in the next attack (the Battle of Polygon Wood), beginning on 26 September. 8th Brigade reached the outskirts of Zonnebeke, but 76th Bde was delayed by the impassable Zonnebeke stream and was stopped short of the objective. A second advance at 18.30 ran into a simultaneous German counter-attack and neither side advanced. During the day A Company built tracks to link the old front line to the new positions captured; two platoons spent the latter part of the day holding defensive positions under the command of 13th King's Regiment. B Company was sent up at 12.30 to build strongpoints for 8th Bde, and suffered numerous casualties. Similarly C Company went up at 14.00 to build strongpoints for 76th Bde, but could not begin work until 20.00, after the counter-attack was repulsed, when it linked up shell holes near Zonnebeke to make a new front line. D Company made a track suitable for horsedrawn limbers along the Ypres–Zonnebeke road, and also held defensive positions. Over the following days companies widened the Ypres–Zonnebeke track, made duckboard tracks across the morass of the Steenbeeke stream, and built more strongpoints. The battalion was pulled out on 2 October and sent to No 3 Camp at Winnezeele, where Maj Charles Roswell Martin took command of the battalion. Next day it moved to Buysscheure to refit and train under V Corps HQ. Although 3rd Division did not attack again at Ypres, 20th KRRC went back to 'Canal Bank' on 10 October to serve under 9th (Scottish) Division, building roads and tracks through the devastated battlefield of the First Battle of Passchendaele, for which it was warmly thanked by that formation's commander. When 9th (S) Division was relieved on 24 October, 20th KRRC remained at 'Dawson's Corner' under XVIII Corps building a light railway line from Canal Bank to the Poelcapelle–St Julien road.

=== Winter 1917–18 ===
Finally, on 4 November, as the Battle of Passchendaele was drawing to a muddy close, 20th KRRC began a series of marches back to Third Army in the Arras area, rejoining 3rd Division at Beugnâtre on 10 November. For the rest of the month and into December it was engaged in draining and mending roads and communication trenches and wiring the support line. On 15 December the battalion moved to Mory, working on the defences here and at Hénin Hill, which would be crucial if, as expected, the Germans attacked this sector in the spring. A new defensive system was being introduced, with Forward, Battle and Rear Zones in place of continuous trench lines; 20th KRRC worked on the all-round defences of the 'keeps' and defended localities in 3rd Division's Battle Zone (the Rear Zone or 'Green Line' had hardly been started).

By early 1918 the BEF was suffering a manpower crisis. It was forced to reduce infantry brigades from four to three battalions, breaking up the surplus units to provide reinforcements to the others. It also took the opportunity to carry out other reorganisations, such as forming divisional machine gun battalions. Pioneer battalions were changed from four to three companies; this mirrored the three RE field companies, which were generally assigned one to each infantry brigade. 20th KRRC completed its reorganisation to the new establishment by 27 February, breaking up D Company and distributing the men among the others.

=== Spring Offensive ===
The Germans launched their long-anticipated Spring Offensive on 21 March 1918. 3rd Division was deployed with 4 battalions in the Forward Zone and the other 5, together with 20th KRRC's pioneers, in the front part of the Battle Zone. The left part of the line was covered by an inundation created by damming the Cojeul stream. In the event, the division's front was not included in the Germans' attack on the first day: the intense preliminary bombardment was directed at the gun positions and rear areas, and apart from some probing raids out of the thick mist, 3rd Division was undisturbed, though 34th Division to the right had been driven back. 20th KRRC remained at work digging new trenches at Henin. The battalion 'stood to' at 05.00 on 22 March, and the divisional area was subjected to very heavy shelling all day. At 11.00 the battalion was ordered to send two companies to support 9th Bde, which had been forced to swing back when 34th Division retreated. A and B Companies held 'Hind Support Trench' until 15.00 when they were ordered to retire when 9th Bde's flank guard swung back further, to the rear of the Battle Zone. By now stragglers from 34th Division were passing through their positions and German patrols could be seen 500 yards (460 m) away, close to the crest of Henin Hill. C Company and Battalion HQ fell back to Neuville-Vitasse, and that night went back further to join Brigade HQ in holding a reserve trench. All spare RE companies and pioneer battalions were being sent back to prepare a new defence line behind the Green Line, but 20th KRRC remained to help defend 3rd Division's threatened flank. A party went forward under the enemy's noses to recover equipment that had been left behind. At 10.30 on 23 March the battalion was sent to Wailly, which was under shellfire all day, some of the battalion equipment and transport being destroyed, though the Germans wasted much of their fire on the trenches that had been abandoned. Only on 24 March, when 8th Bde easily held its own, was the battalion pulled out of the combat zone to go back and join the parties digging new defences. 20th KRRC worked on the 'Purple Line' in front of Bellacourt until 28 March, when together with 3rd Division's RE companies it was ordered to man the defences they had just dug. The Germans were making one last attempt to break through Third Army to Arras (the Third Battle of Arras) but failed. During the night of 28/29 March 3rd Division was finally relieved and 20th KRRC went back to Sus-Saint-Léger to clean up and rest.

3rd Division was now sent north to First Army to take over what was regarded as a 'quiet' sector south-west of Béthune. 20th KRRC moved by motor buses to Bruay on 1 April, then three days later moved to Beuvry where parties worked on the Corps defence line while the rest of the battalion trained. However, the supposed quiet sector was now targeted by the Germans in the second phase of their offensive (the Battle of the Lys) beginning on 9 April. Next day 9th Bde of 3rd Division reinforced 55th (West Lancashire) Division, and together over the following days they held firm, facing north to prevent the Germans from expanding their breakthrough southwards. However, the two divisions continually had to extend their line to the west, the rest of 3rd Division taking up positions along the La Bassée Canal at Hinges. On 11 April 20th KRRC moved to Gonnehem and Chocques, where it worked on wire and strongpoints along the canal. With scratch forces thrown into gaps, the British managed to hold the stretched line throughout the critical days. After a last German attempt on 18 April the fighting died down in the La Bassée Canal sector, though it continued further north. For the rest of the month and the whole of May, 20th KRRC continued strengthening the line held after the battle, and constructing support lines behind it. In the event of another German breakthrough the battalion's role (together with G Special Company, RE) was to provide nucleus garrisons in the support lines who could guide the infantry falling back to the prepared strongpoints and machine gun positions. A practice manning of these defence lines was held on the night of 26/27 May. However, there was no further German attack in this sector.

3rd Division continued holding the La Bassée Canal sector through June, during which the battalion worked on the 'Aberdeen' and 'Gordon' Lines. On the night of 14/15 June the division made a surprise attack on a 2 miles (3.2 km) front to advance its line where the German wire was known to be weak. This penetrated to a depth of 400–500 yards (370–460 m) and over the following three nights 20th KRRC wired up the previous outpost line to convert it into the new main line of resistance ('Edinburgh Line') despite hostile shell and machine gun fire. Until 8 August the battalion continued wiring the positions between the La Bassée and Lawe canals and round the bridgehead at Hinges.

=== Hundred Days Offensive ===
The Allies launched their counter-offensive (the Hundred Days Offensive) with the Battle of Amiens on 8 August. 3rd Division. was withdrawn into reserve, ready to move south and join Third Army in the offensive. 20th KRRC left on 7 August for training, and then moved by rail to Grouches in the Somme country, where it continued training. On the night of 19/20 August it marched to Bienvillers. It was posted in 'Purple Reserve' trench when 3rd Division attacked in dense fog on the morning of 21 August (the Battle of Albert) and reached the railway line that marked the second objective. Over the next three days 20th KRRC repaired the roads and tracks leading forwards to the new positions, which 3rd Division advanced further on 23 August. On 28 August the battalion moved to Moyenneville where it continued road repairs while 3rd Division advanced in the Battle of Bapaume. At the end of this, on 2 September, the battalion moved forward to Saint-Léger, where it continued working on roads until 3rd Division went into reserve.

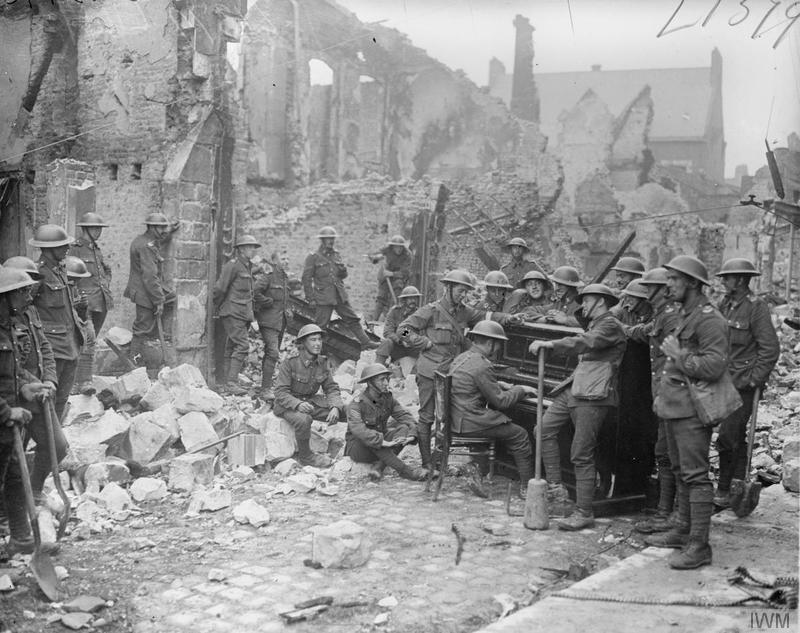
Men of a pioneer battalion taking a break from clearing debris in Cambrai, 12 October 1918.

Third Army had now closed up to the Hindenburg Line once more. 20th KRRC, stationed at Courcelles from 10 September, worked on the roads needed to bring guns and supplies up to assault the line. Third Army launched the Battle of the Canal du Nord on 27 September, with 3rd Division successfully assaulting the Hindenburg Support line and taking Flesquières and Ribécourt. 20th KRRC followed, filling shell holes in the roads from Havrincourt to those villages, Battalion HQ moving up to Flesquières on 30 September and to Ribécourt on 1 October when 3rd Division attacked again. 20th KRRC cleared debris from the village of Marcoing and worked on the roads leading towards Cambrai. 3rd Division attacked on 8 October in the Battle of Cambrai and 20th KRRC continued following up, repairing roads as it went. It moved its HQ to Crevecourt on 13 October and Quiévy on 21 October as the pace of the Allied advance to the River Selle quickened.

The Battle of the Selle began on 17 October, and Third Army joined in on 23 October, 3rd Division advancing about 3 miles (4.8 km) against weak opposition. The following morning 20th KRRC moved its HQ into Solesmes on the far bank of the River Selle as the division continued to advance, the pioneers repairing the road behind it. By 25 October 3rd Division's patrols found that the enemy had disappeared from in front and the advance became a pursuit until the Germans were across the River Rhonelle. After a short pause, Third Army attacked across the Rhonelle on 4 November, with 3rd Division in support. The pursuit was then renewed with selected troops, 20th KRRC moving forwards to Ruesnes, near Le Quesnoy, on 6 November to continue road repairs, particularly on the Le Quesnoy–Bavay road. When the Armistice with Germany came into force on 11 November 3rd Division was in reserve, still billeted in the Le Quesnoy–Bavay area.

=== Rhine ===
3rd Division was chosen to form part of the Allied Occupation of the Rhineland. 20th KRRC started its march there on 15 November, crossed the German frontier on 11 December, and reached Düren on 19 December to begin its duties in the Cologne bridgehead.

20th KRRC left 3rd Division and transferred to 2nd Division in February 1919, ceasing to be pioneers and becoming a normal service battalion. The British occupation force was designated British Army of the Rhine in March, and 2nd Division was converted into the Light Division, with 20th KRRC brigaded with 13th and 18th KRRC in 1st Light Brigade. As men were progressively demobilised, the battalion was kept up to strength by absorbing 53rd (Service) Bn KRRC (a former Young Soldier training battalion from England) on 8 April. In November 1919 the Light Division was abolished and 1st Light Brigade became the Light Brigade in the Independent Division. These in turn were broken up in January–February and 20th (Service) Battalion, King's Royal Rifle Corps (BEL) was disbanded on 9 February 1920.

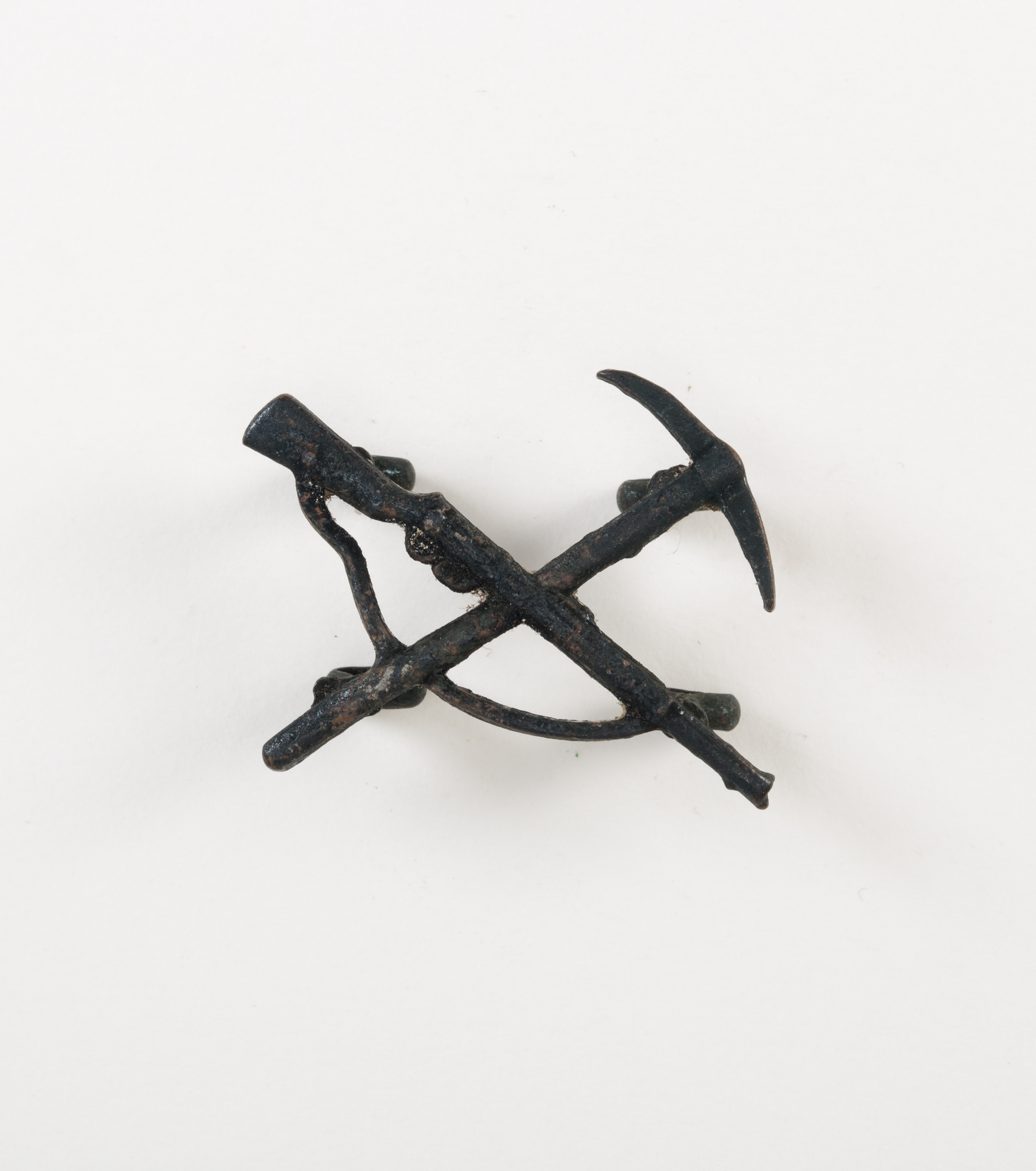
Pioneers' collar badge in black.

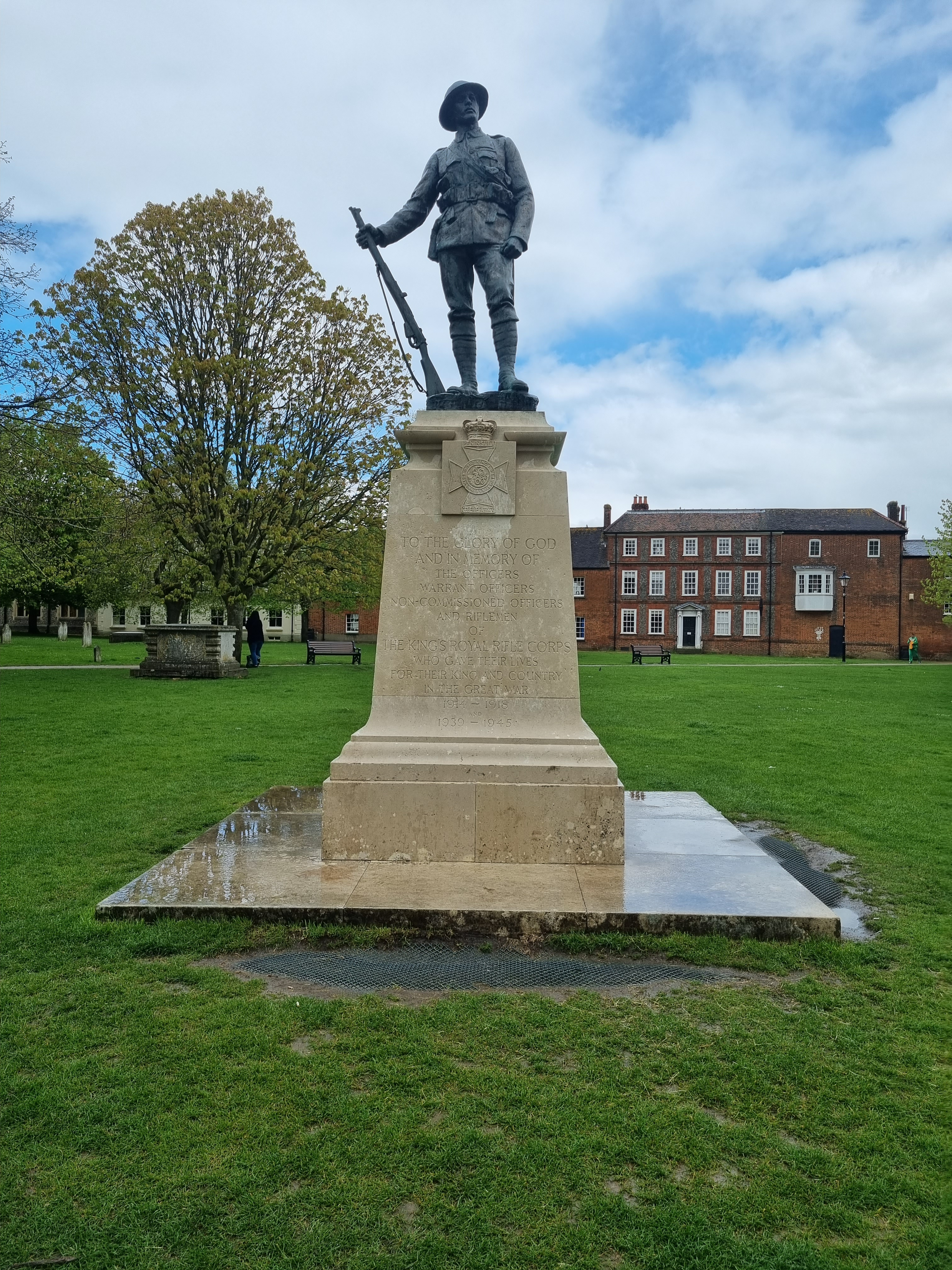
The KRRC memorial at Winchester.

== Insignia ==
As well as the regimental cap badge and black metal 'KRR' title on the shoulder straps, all ranks of 20th KRRC wore the pioneer badge of crossed rifle and pickaxe on each collar, probably in black metal to match the Rifles' black badges and buttons. The companies of 20th KRRC were distinguished by coloured cloth covers on the shoulder straps: originally A Company blue, B green, C red and D yellow; after the introduction of the 3-company system these were A green, B red and C yellow. 3rd Division did not have a permanent scheme of identification marks for its battalions, but temporary signs were worn for the Somme, when 20th KRRC had a yellow square sewn on the haversack. 3rd Division's formation sign was a cross superimposed on a circle, in yellow. This does not appear to have been worn on uniforms, but may have been painted on transport vehicles.

== Memorials ==
The battalion war diary gives little information on casualties, but the Commonwealth War Graves Commission records 276 men of 20th KRRC who died during the war. A number of these who have no known grave are commemorated on the Arras and Thiepval Memorials to the Missing.

The KRRC's World War I memorial, with sculpture by John Tweed, stands near the west door of Winchester Cathedral.

There is also a memorial on Wimbledon Common to the 19th, 22nd and 23rd Reserve Battalions of the King's Royal Rifle Corps who trained there in 1916–18 as part of 26th Reserve Brigade.
