= British Army First World War reserve brigades =

The article lists British Army reserve brigades in World War I. At the start of the war volunteers in the vast majority of cases joined their local infantry regiment's reserve battalion. As the army expanded rapidly, further reserve battalions and brigades were formed. After conscription was introduced in 1916 the existing regimental system could not cope with the large influx of recruits and the existing reserve brigades were incorporated into the Training Reserve, with an official complement of over 209,000 soldiers, in addition to the regimental training units.

== Recruitment ==
On 6 August 1914, less than 48 hours after Britain's declaration of war, Parliament sanctioned an increase of 500,000 men for the Regular British Army, and the newly-appointed Secretary of State for War, Earl Kitchener of Khartoum issued his famous call to arms: 'Your King and Country Need You', urging the first 100,000 volunteers to come forward. This group of six divisions with supporting arms became known as Kitchener's First New Army, or 'K1'. 'K2' and 'K3', followed shortly afterwards. In addition, recruits flooded into the drill halls of the part-time Territorial Force (TF), which had largely volunteered for overseas service. The flood of volunteers overwhelmed the ability of the army to absorb and organise them, and by the time the Fifth New Army ('K5') was authorised on 10 December 1914, many of the units were being organised as 'Pals battalions' under the auspices of mayors and corporations of towns up and down the country. Many of these pals who had lived and worked together, joined up and trained together and were allocated to the same units. The policy of drawing recruits from amongst the local population ensured that, when the Pals battalions suffered casualties, whole towns, villages, neighbourhoods and communities back in Britain were to suffer disproportionate losses.

By the end of August 1914, 300,000 men had signed up to fight, and another 450,000 had joined up by the end of September. Voluntary recruitment remained fairly steady through 1914 and early 1915, but it fell dramatically thereafter. Conscription for single men was introduced in January 1916. Four months later, in May 1916, it was extended to all men aged 18 to 41. The Military Service Act March 1916 specified that men from the ages of 18 to 41 were liable to be called up for service in the army, unless they were married (or widowed with children), or served in one of a number of reserved occupations, which were usually industrial but which also included clergymen and teachers. This legislation did not apply to Ireland, despite its then status as part of the United Kingdom (but see Conscription Crisis of 1918). By January 1916, when conscription was introduced, 2.6 million men had volunteered for service, a further 2.3 million were conscripted before the end of the war; by the end of 1918, the army had reached its peak strength of 4 million men.

== Training ==
Before the war British Army infantry regiments trained their recruits at their home depots from where they were drafted to one of their regiment's Regular Army battalions. On the outbreak of the war the part-time Special Reserve (SR; formerly Militia) battalions were mobilised to supply these reinforcement drafts from Reservists, Special Reservists, returning wounded, and new recruits. The voluntary TF was also mobilised, and after its units volunteered for overseas service in August 1914 they began forming 2nd Line battalions to train their own recruits. By May 1915 the 2nd Line was also being prepared for overseas service, and the TF began forming 3rd Line (in some cases 4th Line) units for training. Meanwhile, the battalions of the 1st, 2nd and 3rd New Armies ('K1', 'K2' and 'K3' of 'Kitchener's Army') were quickly formed at the regimental depots. The SR battalions also swelled with new recruits and were soon well above their establishment strength. By the autumn the depots were overwhelmed, and on 8 October 1914 each SR battalion at its coast defence station was ordered to use its surplus to form a service battalion of the 4th New Army ('K4'). These were organised into six new divisions (30th–35th) divided into 18 brigades (89th–106th). However, on 10 April 1915 the War Office decided to convert the K4 battalions into reserve units, to provide drafts for the K1–K3 battalions in the same way that the SR was doing for the Regular battalions. The K4 divisions were scrapped and their brigades renumbered as 1st–18th Reserve Brigades (the original brigade and division numbers were re-allocated to the 'Pals battalions' of K5). Later the depot companies of the K5 battalions were combined into reserve battalions, and grouped into 19th–26th Reserve Brigades.

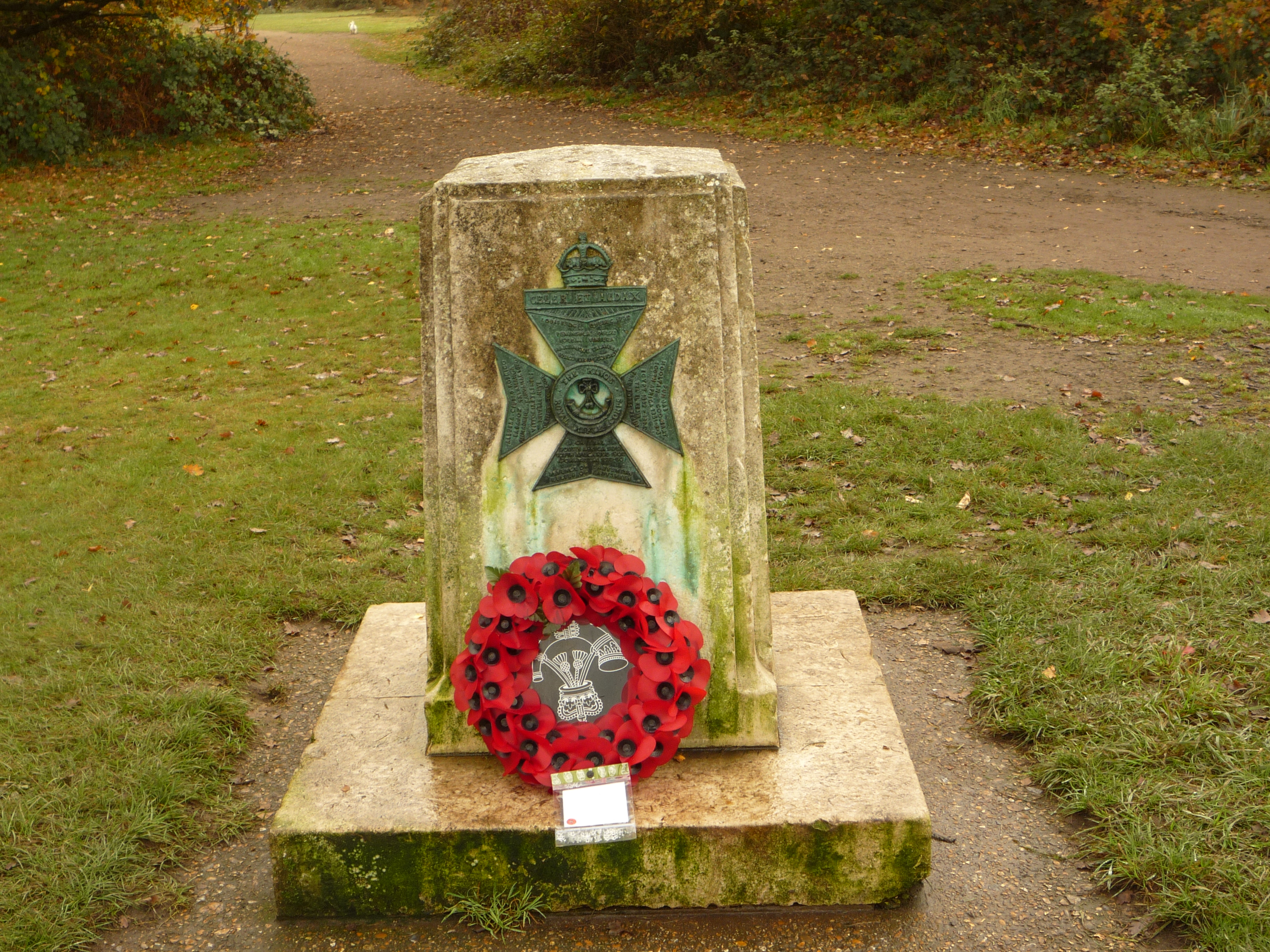

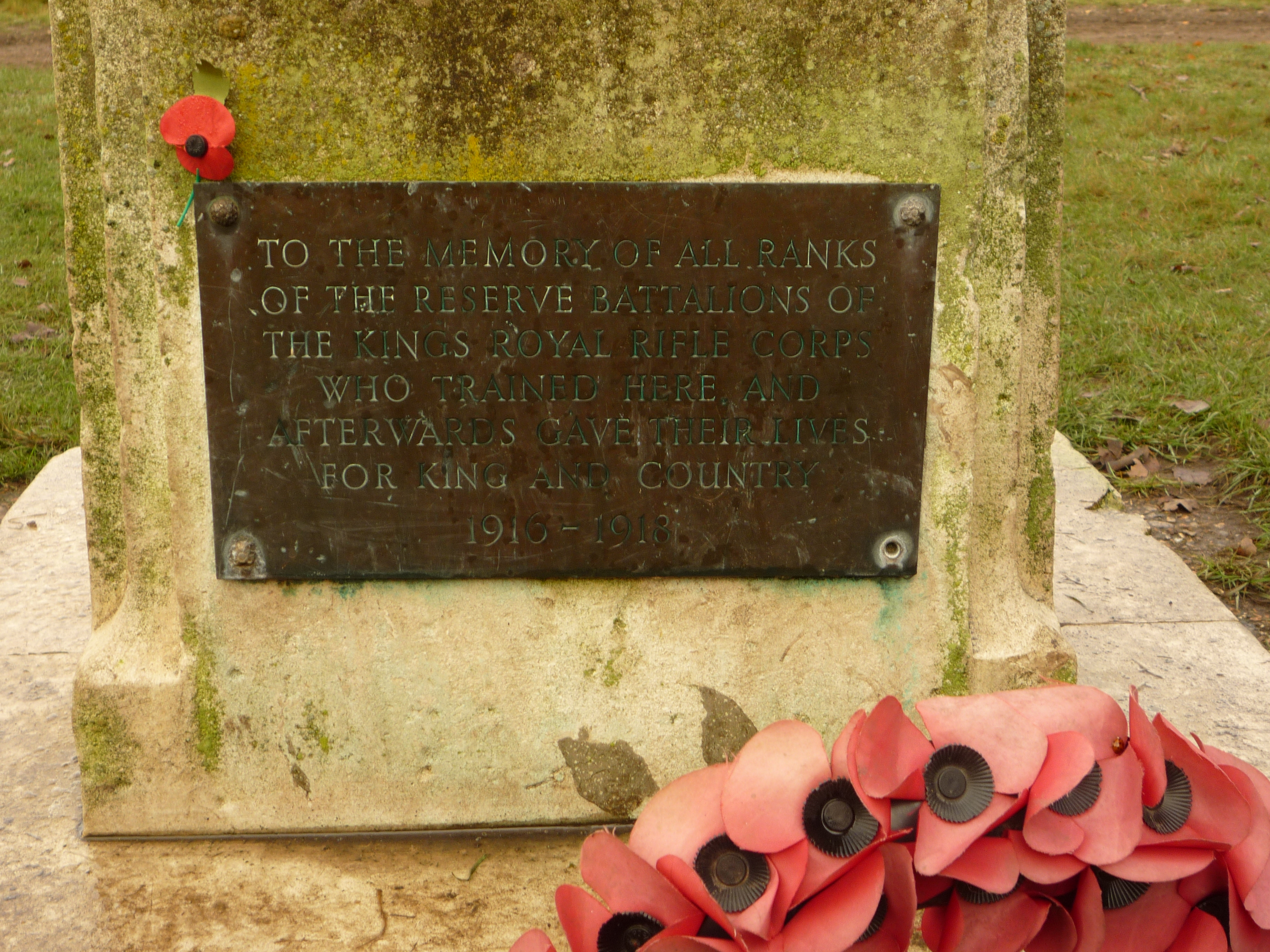
The memorial on Wimbledon Common to the 19th, 22nd and 23rd Reserve Battalions of the King's Royal Rifle Corps who trained there in 1916–18 as part of 26th Reserve Brigade.

On 1 September 1916 the whole training system was centralised with the formation of the Training Reserve (TR). The K4 and K5 reserve battalions lost their regimental affiliation and were redesignated as 1st–112th TR battalions, to which all recruits not required for the regimental reserves (SR and TF) were posted. They were issued with 'General Service' badges and could be drafted to any regiment, but the training officers and non-commissioned officers remained part of their parent regiments. The reserve brigades had now been concentrated at large training camps, and the TR had a total establishment of 209,537 men. Reserve brigades for the Machine Gun Corps were introduced in 1918. There was no change to the status or organisation of the SR battalions, but on 1 September 1916, the 3rd Line TF battalions (referred to as reserve battalions since 1 April) were amalgamated into only one, two or at most three per infantry regiment, and grouped into new reserve brigades bearing the titles of the TF divisions they were reinforcing.

The scheme was further developed to provide for the progressive training of recruits under 19 years old (when they could be sent overseas). Of the 112 TR battalions, 42 were selected: 14 became 'Young Soldier Battalions' and 28 became 'Graduated Battalions'. When a recruit had finished initial training in the Young Soldier Battalion he was sent to one of two associated Graduated battalions, in which the four companies were organised by age, for training in 3-monthly steps between 18 and 19 years. As a result, every 3 months, 28 companies of newly trained 19-year-old soldiers were ready for drafting to France. In due course the War Office decided that Graduated battalions could be used for home defence while the men completed their training (as was the case with the SR). The Graduated battalions then began to be transferred from the Reserve brigades to replace 2nd Line TF battalions in the Home Service divisions. They were renumbered from 201st upwards, but later were once again affiliated with a particular regiment and numbered as the 51st (G), 52nd (G) or 53rd (YS) battalions of their regiment.

== List of brigades ==
=== Reserve Brigades ===
Reserve brigade	Training camp September 1916	Original battalions	TR battalion number September 1916
1st Reserve Brigade (former 89th Brigade)	Rugeley	16th (Reserve) Battalion, Durham Light Infantry	1st
1st Reserve Brigade (former 89th Brigade)	Rugeley	17th (Reserve) Battalion, Durham Light Infantry	2nd
1st Reserve Brigade (former 89th Brigade)	Rugeley	10th (Reserve) Battalion, North Staffordshire Regiment	3rd
1st Reserve Brigade (former 89th Brigade)	Rugeley	11th (Reserve) Battalion, North Staffordshire Regiment	4th
1st Reserve Brigade (former 89th Brigade)	Rugeley	10th (Reserve) Battalion, Leicestershire Regiment	5th
2nd Reserve Brigade (former 90th Brigade)	Brocton	13th (Reserve) Battalion, West Yorkshire Regiment	6th
2nd Reserve Brigade (former 90th Brigade)	Brocton	9th (Reserve) Battalion, East Yorkshire Regiment	7th
2nd Reserve Brigade (former 90th Brigade)	Brocton	11th (Reserve) Battalion, King's Own Yorkshire Light Infantry	8th
2nd Reserve Brigade (former 90th Brigade)	Brocton	11th (Reserve) Battalion, South Staffordshire Regiment	9th
2nd Reserve Brigade (former 90th Brigade)	Brocton	15th (Reserve) Battalion, Green Howards	10th
3rd Reserve Brigade (former 91st Brigade)	Brocton	9th (Reserve) Battalion, Lincolnshire Regiment	11th
3rd Reserve Brigade (former 91st Brigade)	Brocton	13th (Reserve) Battalion, Sherwood Foresters	12th
3rd Reserve Brigade (former 91st Brigade)	Brocton	14th (Reserve) Battalion, Sherwood Foresters	13th
3rd Reserve Brigade (former 91st Brigade)	Brocton	14th (Reserve) Battalion, Manchester Regiment	14th
3rd Reserve Brigade (former 91st Brigade)	Brocton	13th (Reserve) Battalion, Lancashire Fusiliers	15th
4th Reserve Brigade (former 92nd Brigade)	Seaford	11th (Reserve) Battalion, Gloucestershire Regiment	16th
4th Reserve Brigade (former 92nd Brigade)	Seaford	11th (Reserve) Battalion, Loyal North Lancashire Regiment	17th
4th Reserve Brigade (former 92nd Brigade)	Seaford	14th (Reserve) Battalion, King's Royal Rifle Corps	(Note: Absorbed into the other battalions of 4th Reserve Bde)
4th Reserve Brigade (former 92nd Brigade)	Seaford	15th (Reserve) Battalion, King's Royal Rifle Corps	18th
4th Reserve Brigade (former 92nd Brigade)	Seaford	14th (Reserve) Battalion, Rifle Brigade	19th
4th Reserve Brigade (former 92nd Brigade)	Seaford	15th (Reserve) Battalion, Rifle Brigade	20th
5th Reserve Brigade (former 93rd Brigade)	Shoreham	9th (Reserve) Battalion, Queen's (Royal West Surrey Regiment)	21st
5th Reserve Brigade (former 93rd Brigade)	Shoreham	11th (Reserve) Battalion, East Surrey Regiment	(Note: Amalgamated with 9th Queen's to form 21st TR Battalion)
5th Reserve Brigade (former 93rd Brigade)	Shoreham	16th (Reserve) Battalion, Royal Fusiliers	22nd
5th Reserve Brigade (former 93rd Brigade)	Shoreham	9th (Reserve) Battalion, Queens Own (Royal West Kent Regiment)	(Note: Absorbed into 16th (Reserve) Battalion, Royal Fusiliers)
5th Reserve Brigade (former 93rd Brigade)	Shoreham	10th (Reserve) Battalion, Royal Sussex Regiment	23rd
5th Reserve Brigade (former 93rd Brigade)	Shoreham	14th (Reserve) Battalion, Middlesex Regiment	24th
5th Reserve Brigade (former 93rd Brigade)	Shoreham	15th (Reserve) Battalion, Middlesex Regiment	(Note: Absorbed into the other battalions of 5th Reserve Bde)
6th Reserve Brigade (former 94th Brigade)	Harwich	10th (Reserve) Battalion, Norfolk Regiment	25th
6th Reserve Brigade (former 94th Brigade)	Harwich	10th (Reserve) Battalion, Suffolk Regiment	26th
6th Reserve Brigade (former 94th Brigade)	Harwich	9th (Reserve) Battalion, Bedfordshire Regiment	(Note: Absorbed into the other battalions of 6th Reserve Bde)
6th Reserve Brigade (former 94th Brigade)	Harwich	10th (Reserve) Battalion, Bedfordshire Regiment	27th
6th Reserve Brigade (former 94th Brigade)	Harwich	8th (Reserve) Battalion, Northamptonshire Regiment	28th
7th Reserve Brigade (former 95th Brigade)	Dover	9th (Reserve) Battalion, Buffs (East Kent Regiment)	29th
7th Reserve Brigade (former 95th Brigade)	Dover	10th (Reserve) Battalion, East Surrey Regiment	30th
7th Reserve Brigade (former 95th Brigade)	Dover	14th (Reserve) Battalion, Royal Fusiliers	31st
7th Reserve Brigade (former 95th Brigade)	Dover	15th (Reserve) Battalion, Royal Fusiliers	32nd
8th Reserve Brigade (former 96th Brigade)	Wool	12th (Reserve) Battalion, Royal Warwickshire Regiment	(Note: Absorbed into the other battalions of 8th Reserve Bde)
8th Reserve Brigade (former 96th Brigade)	Wool	13th (Reserve) Battalion, Royal Warwickshire Regiment	33rd
8th Reserve Brigade (former 96th Brigade)	Wool	13th (Reserve) Battalion, Hampshire Regiment	34th
8th Reserve Brigade (former 96th Brigade)	Wool	7th (Reserve) Battalion, Dorset Regiment	35th
8th Reserve Brigade (former 96th Brigade)	Wool	9th (Reserve) Battalion, Oxfordshire and Buckinghamshire Light Infantry	36th
8th Reserve Brigade (former 96th Brigade)	Wool	9th (Reserve) Battalion, Royal Berkshire Regiment	37th
8th Reserve Brigade (former 96th Brigade)	Wool	8th (Reserve) Battalion, Wiltshire Regiment	(Note: Absorbed into the other battalions of 8th Reserve Bde)
9th Reserve Brigade (former 97th Brigade)	Dunfermline	11th (Reserve) Battalion, Black Watch	38th
9th Reserve Brigade (former 97th Brigade)	Dunfermline	10th (Reserve) Battalion, Seaforth Highlanders	39th
9th Reserve Brigade (former 97th Brigade)	Dunfermline	8th (Reserve) Battalion, Cameron Highlanders	40th
9th Reserve Brigade (former 97th Brigade)	Dunfermline	13th (Reserve) Battalion, Argyll & Sutherland Highlanders	41st
9th Reserve Brigade (former 97th Brigade)	Dunfermline	11th (Reserve) Battalion, Gordon Highlanders	42nd
10th Reserve Brigade (former 98th Brigade)	Wareham	10th (Reserve) Battalion, King's Own Royal Regiment (Lancaster)	43rd
10th Reserve Brigade (former 98th Brigade)	Wareham	11th (Reserve) Battalion, Devonshire Regiment	44th
10th Reserve Brigade (former 98th Brigade)	Wareham	9th (Reserve) Battalion, Somerset Light Infantry	45th
10th Reserve Brigade (former 98th Brigade)	Wareham	12th (Reserve) Battalion, Worcestershire Regiment	(Note: Absorbed into the other battalions of 10th Reserve Bde)
10th Reserve Brigade (former 98th Brigade)	Wareham	13th (Reserve) Battalion, Worcestershire Regiment	46th
10th Reserve Brigade (former 98th Brigade)	Wareham	10th (Reserve) Battalion, East Lancashire Regiment	47th
11th Reserve Brigade (former 99th Brigade)	Prees Heath	9th (Reserve) Battalion, Shropshire Light Infantry	48th
11th Reserve Brigade (former 99th Brigade)	Prees Heath	15th (Reserve) Battalion, King's (Liverpool Regiment)	49th
11th Reserve Brigade (former 99th Brigade)	Prees Heath	16th (Reserve) Battalion, King's (Liverpool Regiment)	(Note: Absorbed into the other battalions of 11th Reserve Bde)
11th Reserve Brigade (former 99th Brigade)	Prees Heath	14th (Reserve) Battalion, Cheshire Regiment	50th
11th Reserve Brigade (former 99th Brigade)	Prees Heath	10th (Reserve) Battalion, South Lancashire Regiment	51st
12th Reserve Brigade (former 100th Brigade)	Kinghorn	13th (Reserve) Battalion, Highland Light Infantry	52nd
12th Reserve Brigade (former 100th Brigade)	Kinghorn	9th (Reserve) Battalion, King's Own Scottish Borderers	53rd
12th Reserve Brigade (former 100th Brigade)	Kinghorn	14th (Reserve) Battalion, Royal Scots	54th
12th Reserve Brigade (former 100th Brigade)	Kinghorn	9th (Reserve) Battalion, Royal Scots Fusiliers	55th
12th Reserve Brigade (former 100th Brigade)	Kinghorn	12th (Reserve) Battalion, Scottish Rifles	56th
13th Reserve Brigade (former 101st Brigade)	Kinmel Park	9th (Reserve) Battalion, South Wales Borderers	57th
13th Reserve Brigade (former 101st Brigade)	Kinmel Park	12th (Reserve) Battalion, Welsh Regiment	58th
13th Reserve Brigade (former 101st Brigade)	Kinmel Park	13th (Reserve) Battalion, South Wales Borderers	59th
13th Reserve Brigade (former 101st Brigade)	Kinmel Park	20th (Reserve) Battalion (3rd Rhondda), Welsh Regiment	60th
13th Reserve Brigade (former 101st Brigade)	Kinmel Park	21st (Reserve) Battalion, Welsh Regiment	61st
14th Reserve Brigade (former 102nd Brigade)	Kinmel Park	12th (Reserve) Battalion, Royal Welsh Fusiliers	62nd
14th Reserve Brigade (former 102nd Brigade)	Kinmel Park	18th and 20th (Reserve) Battalions, Royal Welsh Fusiliers	63rd
14th Reserve Brigade (former 102nd Brigade)	Kinmel Park	21st and 22nd (Reserve) Battalions, Royal Welsh Fusiliers	64th
14th Reserve Brigade (former 102nd Brigade)	Kinmel Park	14th (Reserve) Battalion, South Wales Borderers	65th
14th Reserve Brigade (former 102nd Brigade)	Kinmel Park	22nd (Reserve) Battalion, the Welsh Regiment	66th
15th (Ulster) Reserve Brigade (former 103rd Brigade)	Ireland	3rd (Reserve) Battalion, Royal Inniskilling Fusiliers	–
15th (Ulster) Reserve Brigade (former 103rd Brigade)	Ireland	4th (Extra Reserve) Battalion, Royal Inniskilling Fusiliers	–
15th (Ulster) Reserve Brigade (former 103rd Brigade)	Ireland	12th (Reserve) Battalion, Royal Inniskilling Fusiliers	(Note: Absorbed into 3rd (Reserve) Battalion, Royal Inniskilling Fusiliers)
15th (Ulster) Reserve Brigade (former 103rd Brigade)	Ireland	3rd (Reserve) Battalion, Royal Irish Rifles	–
15th (Ulster) Reserve Brigade (former 103rd Brigade)	Ireland	4th (Extra Reserve) Battalion, Royal Irish Rifles	–
15th (Ulster) Reserve Brigade (former 103rd Brigade)	Ireland	5th (Extra Reserve) Battalion, Royal Irish Rifles	–
15th (Ulster) Reserve Brigade (former 103rd Brigade)	Ireland	3rd (Reserve) Battalion, Royal Irish Fusiliers	–
15th (Ulster) Reserve Brigade (former 103rd Brigade)	Ireland	4th (Extra Reserve) Battalion, Royal Irish Fusiliers	–
16th Reserve Brigade (former 104th Brigade)	Altcar	21st (Reserve) Battalion, King's (Liverpool Regiment)	67th
16th Reserve Brigade (former 104th Brigade)	Altcar	22nd (Reserve) Battalion, King's (Liverpool Regiment)	68th
16th Reserve Brigade (former 104th Brigade)	Altcar	25th (Reserve) Battalion, Manchester Regiment	69th
16th Reserve Brigade (former 104th Brigade)	Altcar	26th (Reserve) Battalion, Manchester Regiment	70th
16th Reserve Brigade (former 104th Brigade)	Altcar	27th (Reserve) Battalion, Manchester Regiment	71st
17th Reserve Brigade (former 105th Brigade)	Prees Heath	21st (Reserve) Battalion, Lancashire Fusiliers	72nd
17th Reserve Brigade (former 105th Brigade)	Prees Heath	22nd (Reserve) Battalion, Lancashire Fusiliers	73rd
17th Reserve Brigade (former 105th Brigade)	Prees Heath	17th (Reserve) Battalion, Cheshire Regiment	74th
17th Reserve Brigade (former 105th Brigade)	Prees Heath	12th (Reserve) Battalion, East Lancashire Regiment	75th
17th Reserve Brigade (former 105th Brigade)	Prees Heath	12th (Reserve) Battalion, King's Own (Royal Lancaster Regiment)	76th
18th Reserve Brigade (former 106th Brigade)	Dundee	18th (Reserve) Battalion, Royal Scots	77th
18th Reserve Brigade (former 106th Brigade)	Dundee	19th (Reserve) Battalion, Highland Light Infantry	78th
18th Reserve Brigade (former 106th Brigade)	Dundee	20th (Reserve) Battalion, Highland Light Infantry	79th
19th Reserve Brigade	Newcastle upon Tyne	32nd (Reserve) Battalion, Northumberland Fusiliers	80th
19th Reserve Brigade	Newcastle upon Tyne	14th (Reserve) Battalion, Yorkshire Regiment	81st
19th Reserve Brigade	Newcastle upon Tyne	11th (Reserve) Battalion, Lincolnshire Regiment	82nd
19th Reserve Brigade	Newcastle upon Tyne	12th (Reserve) Battalion, Leicestershire Regiment	83rd
19th Reserve Brigade	Newcastle upon Tyne	19th (Reserve) Battalion, Sherwood Foresters	(Note: Absorbed into the other battalions of 19th Reserve Bde)
20th Reserve Brigade (1st Training Brigade, MGC, early 1918)	Hornsea	29th (Reserve) Battalion, Northumberland Fusiliers re-designated "A" Battalion, MGC	84th
20th Reserve Brigade (1st Training Brigade, MGC, early 1918)	Hornsea	30th (Reserve) Battalion, Northumberland Fusiliers re-designated "B" Battalion, MGC	85th
20th Reserve Brigade (1st Training Brigade, MGC, early 1918)	Hornsea	31st (Reserve) Battalion, Northumberland Fusiliers re-designated "C" Battalion, MGC	86th
20th Reserve Brigade (1st Training Brigade, MGC, early 1918)	Hornsea	21st (Reserve) Battalion, Durham Light Infantry re-designated "D" Battalion, MGC	87th
20th Reserve Brigade (1st Training Brigade, MGC, early 1918)	Hornsea	23rd (Reserve) Battalion, Durham Light Infantry	(Note: Absorbed into the other battalions of 20th Reserve Bde)
21st Reserve Brigade	Blyth, Northumberland	19th (Reserve) Battalion, West Yorkshire Regiment	88th
21st Reserve Brigade	Blyth, Northumberland	20th (Reserve) Battalion, West Yorkshire Regiment	89th
21st Reserve Brigade	Blyth, Northumberland	14th (Reserve) Battalion, East Yorkshire Regiment (Hull)	90th
21st Reserve Brigade	Blyth, Northumberland	15th (Reserve) Battalion, East Yorkshire Regiment	(Note: Absorbed into 15th (Reserve) Battalion, York and Lancaster Regiment)
21st Reserve Brigade	Blyth, Northumberland	15th (Reserve) Battalion, York and Lancaster Regiment	91st
21st Reserve Brigade	Blyth, Northumberland	24th (Reserve) Battalion, King's Royal Rifle Corps	(Note: Absorbed into the other battalions of 21st Reserve Bde)
22nd Reserve Brigade	Chiseldon	17th (Reserve) Battalion, Royal Warwickshire Regiment	92nd
22nd Reserve Brigade	Chiseldon	15th (Reserve) Battalion, Gloucestershire Regiment	93rd
22nd Reserve Brigade	Chiseldon	16th (Reserve) Battalion, Gloucestershire Regiment	94th
22nd Reserve Brigade	Chiseldon	11th (Reserve) Battalion, Duke of Cornwall's Light Infantry	95th
22nd Reserve Brigade	Chiseldon	16th (Reserve) Battalion, Hampshire Regiment (Portsmouth)	96th
23rd Reserve Brigade	Northampton, to Aldershot May 1916	12th (Reserve) Battalion, Queen's (Royal West Surrey Regiment)	97th
23rd Reserve Brigade	Northampton, to Aldershot May 1916	14th (Reserve) Battalion, Essex Regiment	98th
23rd Reserve Brigade	Northampton, to Aldershot May 1916	12th (Reserve) Battalion, Royal West Kents	99th
23rd Reserve Brigade	Northampton, to Aldershot May 1916	24th (Reserve) Battalion, Middlesex Regiment	100th
23rd Reserve Brigade	Northampton, to Aldershot May 1916	27th (Reserve) Battalion, Middlesex Regiment	101st
23rd Reserve Brigade	Northampton, to Aldershot May 1916	28th (Reserve) Battalion, Middlesex Regiment	102nd
24th Reserve Brigade	Edinburgh	27th (Reserve) Battalion, Royal Fusiliers	103rd
24th Reserve Brigade	Edinburgh	28th (Reserve) Battalion, Royal Fusiliers	104th
24th Reserve Brigade	Edinburgh	29th (Reserve) Battalion, Royal Fusiliers	105th
24th Reserve Brigade	Edinburgh	30th (Reserve) Battalion, Royal Fusiliers	106th
24th Reserve Brigade	Edinburgh	31st (Reserve) Battalion, Royal Fusiliers	107th
25th (Irish) Reserve Brigade	Curragh Camp, to Larkhill April 1918	5th (Extra Reserve) Battalion, Royal Irish Rifles	–
25th (Irish) Reserve Brigade	Curragh Camp, to Larkhill April 1918	5th (Extra Reserve) Battalion, Leinster Regiment	–
25th (Irish) Reserve Brigade	Curragh Camp, to Larkhill April 1918	5th (Extra Reserve) Battalion, Royal Dublin Fusiliers	–
25th (Irish) Reserve Brigade	Curragh Camp, to Larkhill April 1918	5th (Extra Reserve) Battalion, Royal Munster Fusiliers	–
26th Reserve Brigade	Banbury, to Wimbledon by June 1916	13th (Reserve) Battalion, Suffolk Regiment (Cambridgeshire)	108th
26th Reserve Brigade	Banbury, to Wimbledon by June 1916	14th (Reserve) Battalion, East Surrey Regiment	(Note: Absorbed into the other battalions of 26th Reserve Bde)
26th Reserve Brigade	Banbury, to Wimbledon by June 1916	19th (Reserve) Battalion, King's Royal Rifle Corps	109th
26th Reserve Brigade	Banbury, to Wimbledon by June 1916	22nd (Reserve) Battalion, King's Royal Rifle Corps	110th
26th Reserve Brigade	Banbury, to Wimbledon by June 1916	23rd (Reserve) Battalion, King's Royal Rifle Corps	111th
26th Reserve Brigade	Banbury, to Wimbledon by June 1916	17th (Reserve) Battalion, Rifle Brigade	112th
28th Reserve Brigade (Formed early 1918, became 2nd Training; Brigade, MGC)		"E" Battalion, MGC	113th
28th Reserve Brigade (Formed early 1918, became 2nd Training; Brigade, MGC)		"F" Battalion, MGC	114th
28th Reserve Brigade (Formed early 1918, became 2nd Training; Brigade, MGC)		"G" Battalion, MGC	115th
28th Reserve Brigade (Formed early 1918, became 2nd Training; Brigade, MGC)		"H" Battalion, MGC	116th

=== Territorial Force Reserve Brigades ===
Reserve brigade title	Battalions
Highland Reserve Brigade	4th (Reserve) Battalion, Black Watch
Highland Reserve Brigade	4th (Reserve) Battalion, Seaforth Highlanders
Highland Reserve Brigade	4th (Reserve) Battalion, Gordon Highlanders
Highland Reserve Brigade	5th (Reserve) Battalion, Argyll and Sutherland Highlanders
Lowland Reserve Brigade	4th (Reserve) Battalion, Royal Scots
Lowland Reserve Brigade	9th (Reserve) Battalion, Royal Scots
Lowland Reserve Brigade	4th (Reserve) Battalion, Royal Scots Fusiliers
Lowland Reserve Brigade	4th (Reserve) Battalion, King's Own Scottish Borderers
Lowland Reserve Brigade	5th (Reserve) Battalion, Scottish Rifles
Lowland Reserve Brigade	5th (Reserve) Battalion, Highland Light Infantry
Lowland Reserve Brigade	6th (Reserve) Battalion, Highland Light Infantry
West Lancashire Reserve Brigade	5th (Reserve) Battalion, King's (Liverpool Regiment)
West Lancashire Reserve Brigade	7th (Reserve) Battalion, King's (Liverpool Regiment)
West Lancashire Reserve Brigade	10th (Reserve) Battalion, King's (Liverpool Regiment)
West Lancashire Reserve Brigade	4th (Reserve) Battalion, South Lancashire Regiment
West Lancashire Reserve Brigade	4th (Reserve) Battalion, South Lancashire Regiment
West Lancashire Reserve Brigade	4th (Reserve) Battalion, Loyal North Lancashire Regiment
East Lancashire Reserve Brigade	5th (Reserve) Battalion, Lancashire Fusiliers
East Lancashire Reserve Brigade	4th (Reserve) Battalion, East Lancashire Regiment
East Lancashire Reserve Brigade	4th (Reserve) Battalion, Border Regiment
East Lancashire Reserve Brigade	5th (Reserve) Battalion, Manchester Regiment
Welsh Reserve Brigade	4th (Reserve) Battalion, Cheshire Regiment
Welsh Reserve Brigade	4th (Reserve) Battalion, Royal Welsh Fusiliers
Welsh Reserve Brigade	4th (Reserve) Battalion, Welsh Regiment
Welsh Reserve Brigade	4th (Reserve) Battalion, Shropshire Light Infantry
Welsh Reserve Brigade	1st (Reserve) Battalion, Monmouthshire Regiment
Welsh Reserve Brigade	1st (Reserve) Battalion, Brecknockshire Battalion
Welsh Reserve Brigade	1st (Reserve) Battalion, Herefordshire Regiment
Northumbrian Reserve Brigade	4th (Reserve) Battalion, Northumberland Fusiliers
Northumbrian Reserve Brigade	4th (Reserve) Battalion, East Yorkshire Regiment
Northumbrian Reserve Brigade	4th Reserve) Battalion, Green Howards
Northumbrian Reserve Brigade	5th (Reserve) Battalion, Durham Light Infantry
West Riding Reserve Brigade	5th (Reserve) Battalion, West Yorkshire Regiment
West Riding Reserve Brigade	7th (Reserve) Battalion, West Yorkshire Regiment
West Riding Reserve Brigade	4th (Reserve) Battalion, Duke of Wellington's Regiment
West Riding Reserve Brigade	6th (Reserve) Battalion, Duke of Wellington's Regiment
West Riding Reserve Brigade	4th (Reserve) Battalion, King's Own Yorkshire Light Infantry
West Riding Reserve Brigade	4th (Reserve) Battalion, York and Lancaster Regiment
North Midland Reserve Brigade	4th (Reserve) Battalion, Lincolnshire Regiment
North Midland Reserve Brigade	4th (Reserve) Battalion, Leicestershire Regiment
North Midland Reserve Brigade	5th (Reserve) Battalion, South Staffordshire Regiment
North Midland Reserve Brigade	5th (Reserve) Battalion, Sherwood Foresters
North Midland Reserve Brigade	5th (Reserve) Battalion, North Staffordshire Regiment
South Midland Reserve Brigade	5th (Reserve) Battalion, Royal Warwickshire Regiment
South Midland Reserve Brigade	7th (Reserve) Battalion, Royal Warwickshire Regiment
South Midland Reserve Brigade	4th (Reserve) Battalion, Gloucestershire Regiment
South Midland Reserve Brigade	7th (Reserve) Battalion, Worcestershire Regiment
South Midland Reserve Brigade	4th (Reserve) Battalion, Oxfordshire and Buckinghamshire Light Infantry
South Midland Reserve Brigade	4th (Reserve) Battalion, Royal Berkshire Regiment
East Anglian Reserve Brigade	4th (Reserve) Battalion, Norfolk Regiment
East Anglian Reserve Brigade	4th (Reserve) Battalion, Suffolk Regiment (later Cambridge and Suffolk Reserve Bn)
East Anglian Reserve Brigade	5th (Reserve) Battalion, Bedfordshire Regiment
East Anglian Reserve Brigade	4th (Reserve) Battalion, Essex Regiment
East Anglian Reserve Brigade	4th (Reserve) Battalion, Northamptonshire Regiment
East Anglian Reserve Brigade	1st (Reserve) Battalion, Cambridgeshire Regiment
East Anglian Reserve Brigade	1st (Reserve) Battalion, Hertfordshire Regiment
Home Counties Reserve Brigade	4th (Reserve) Battalion, Queen's (Royal West Surrey) Regiment
Home Counties Reserve Brigade	4th (Reserve) Battalion, Buffs (East Kent Regiment)
Home Counties Reserve Brigade	5th (Reserve) Battalion, East Surrey Regiment
Home Counties Reserve Brigade	4th (Reserve) Battalion, Royal Sussex Regiment
Home Counties Reserve Brigade	4th (Reserve) Battalion, Royal West Kent Regiment
Home Counties Reserve Brigade	7th (Reserve) Battalion, Middlesex Regiment
Wessex Reserve Brigade	4th (Reserve) Battalion, Devonshire Regiment
Wessex Reserve Brigade	4th (Reserve) Battalion, Somerset Light Infantry
Wessex Reserve Brigade	4th (Reserve) Battalion, Duke of Cornwall's Light Infantry
Wessex Reserve Brigade	4th (Reserve) Battalion, Hampshire Regiment
Wessex Reserve Brigade	5th (Reserve) Battalion, Hampshire Regiment
Wessex Reserve Brigade	4th (Reserve) Battalion, Dorset Regiment
Wessex Reserve Brigade	4th (Reserve) Battalion, Wiltshire Regiment
1st London Reserve Brigade	1st (Reserve) Battalion, London Regiment
1st London Reserve Brigade	3rd (Reserve) Battalion, London Regiment
1st London Reserve Brigade	5th (Reserve) Battalion, London Regiment
1st London Reserve Brigade	6th (Reserve) Battalion, London Regiment
1st London Reserve Brigade	8th (Reserve) Battalion, London Regiment
1st London Reserve Brigade	9th (Reserve) Battalion, London Regiment
1st London Reserve Brigade	10th (Reserve) Battalion, London Regiment
1st London Reserve Brigade	1st (Reserve) Battalion, Honourable Artillery Company
2nd London Reserve Brigade	13th (Reserve) Battalion, London Regiment
2nd London Reserve Brigade	14th (Reserve) Battalion, London Regiment
2nd London Reserve Brigade	15th (Reserve) Battalion, London Regiment
2nd London Reserve Brigade	16th (Reserve) Battalion, London Regiment
2nd London Reserve Brigade	17th (Reserve) Battalion, London Regiment
2nd London Reserve Brigade	18th (Reserve) Battalion, London Regiment
2nd London Reserve Brigade	19th (Reserve) Battalion, London Regiment
2nd London Reserve Brigade	20th (Reserve) Battalion, London Regiment
2nd London Reserve Brigade	21st (Reserve) Battalion, London Regiment
2nd London Reserve Brigade	22nd (Reserve) Battalion, London Regiment
3rd London Reserve Brigade (formed January 1918)	13th (Reserve) Battalion, London Regiment
3rd London Reserve Brigade (formed January 1918)	15th (Reserve) Battalion, London Regiment
3rd London Reserve Brigade (formed January 1918)	16th (Reserve) Battalion, London Regiment
3rd London Reserve Brigade (formed January 1918)	17th (Reserve) Battalion, London Regiment

== See also ==
- British Army during World War I
- British infantry brigades of the First World War

== Bibliography ==
- Army Council Instructions Issued During August 1916, London: HM Stationery Office.
- Maj A.F. Becke,History of the Great War: Order of Battle of Divisions, Part 2a: The Territorial Force Mounted Divisions and the 1st-Line Territorial Force Divisions (42–56), London: HM Stationery Office, 1935/Uckfield: Naval & Military Press, 2007, ISBN 1-847347-39-8.
- Maj A.F. Becke,History of the Great War: Order of Battle of Divisions, Part 2b: The 2nd-Line Territorial Force Divisions (57th–69th), with the Home-Service Divisions (71st–73rd) and 74th and 75th Divisions, London: HM Stationery Office, 1937/Uckfield: Naval & Military Press, 2007, ISBN 1-847347-39-8.
- Maj A.F. Becke,History of the Great War: Order of Battle of Divisions, Part 3b: New Army Divisions (30–41) and 63rd (R.N.) Division, London: HM Stationery Office, 1939/Uckfield: Naval & Military Press, 2007, ISBN 1-847347-41-X.
- Malcolm Chandler, The Home Front, 1914–18, London: Heinemann, 2001, ISBN 0-435-32729-1.
- J.B.M. Frederick, Lineage Book of British Land Forces 1660–1978, Vol I, Wakefield: Microform Academic, 1984, ISBN 1-85117-007-3.
- Brig E.A. James, British Regiments 1914–18, London: Samson Books, 1978, ISBN 0-906304-03-2/Uckfield: Naval & Military Press, 2001, ISBN 978-1-84342-197-9.
- Martin Middlebrook, The First Day on the Somme, 1 July 1916, London: Allen Lane 1971/Fontana, 1975, ISBN 0-00-633626-4.
- Spencer Tucker & Priscilla Mary Roberts, World War I: encyclopedia, ABC-CLIO, 2005, ISBN 1-85109-420-2.
- Ward, S G P (2005) [1962]. Faithful. The Story of the Durham Light Infantry. Naval and Military Press. ISBN 978-1-84574-147-1.
- Instructions Issued by the War Office During April 1915, London: HM Stationery Office.
- Lt-Col Frederick Ernest Whitton, The History of the Prince of Wales's Leinster Regiment (Royal Canadians), Part II: The Great War and the Disbandment of the Regiment, Aldershot: Gale & Polden, ca 1922.

=== External sources ===
- Chris Baker, The Long, Long Trail
