= British Empire League =

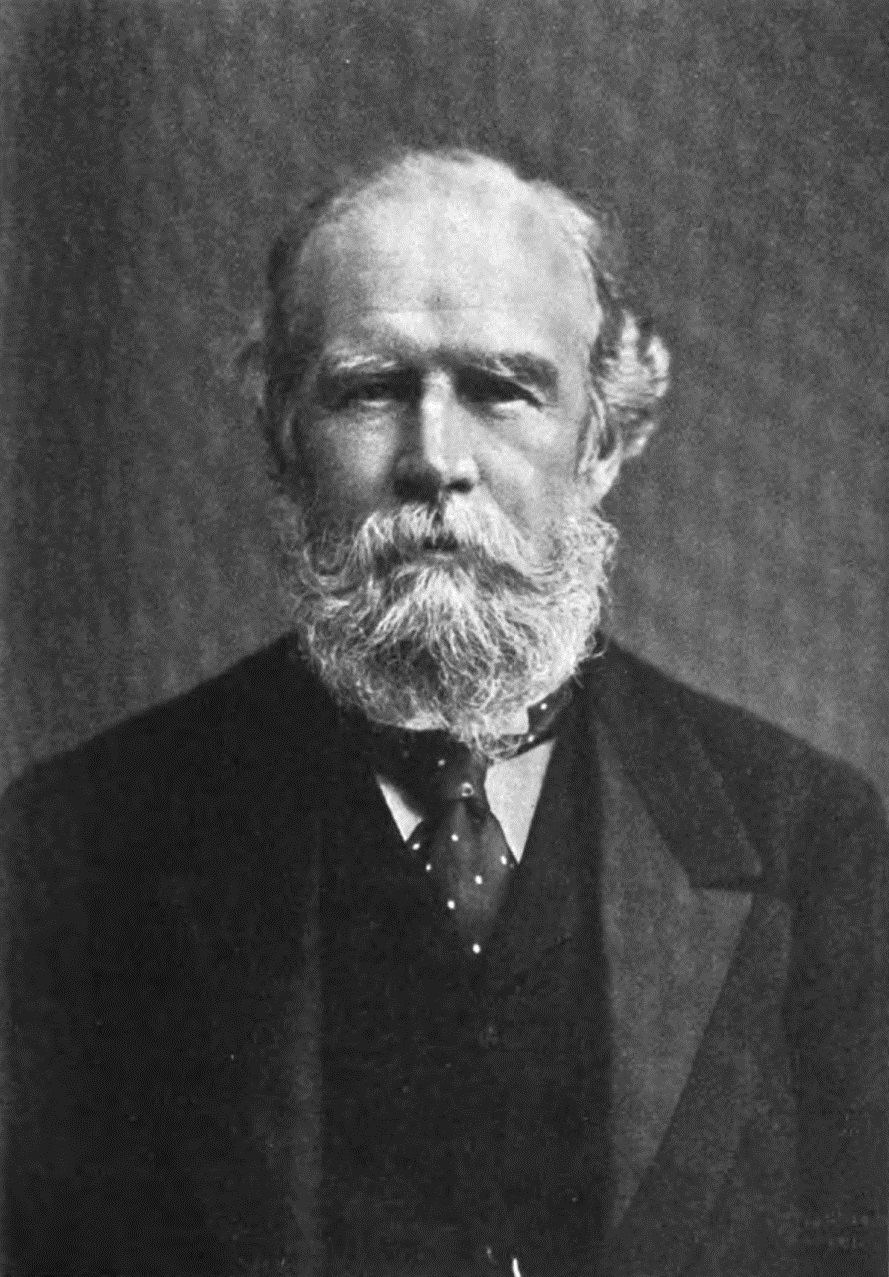
- Founder Lord Avebury
- Predecessor: Imperial Federation League
- Founded: 1895; 131 years ago
- Founder: Lord Avebury
- Dissolved: 1955; 71 years ago
- Headquarters: London, England, U.K.

The British Empire League existed from 1895 to 1955; its purpose was to secure permanent unity for the British Empire.

== Origin ==
The British Empire League was a society founded by Lord Avebury (1834-1913), Lord Roberts (1832-1914) and Lord Strathcona (1820-1914) in London in 1895 with the aim of securing permanent unity for the British Empire. It was successor to the former Imperial Federation League, which had broken up in 1893.

Presidents of the League included: Lord Derby (1841-1908), Lord Sydenham (1848-1933), and the Duke of Devonshire (1833-1908); Vice-Presidents included: Bonar Law (1858-1923), Earl Grey (1851-1917), and Arthur Balfour (1848-1930).

In 1947, the League merged with the Commonwealth Industries Association, retaining its name until 1955.

== Purpose ==
At Imperial Conferences between 1897 and 1911, the League called, among other things, for the introduction of an imperial penny post; later it called for preferential tariffs, putting forward a strong case at the 1932 British Empire Economic Conference for the protection of the British film industry. The League helped to mobilise troops during the Second Boer War and again in the First World War (the 17th (British Empire League) and 20th (British Empire League Pioneers) battalions of the King's Royal Rifle Corps).

The League was active in the British dominions of Australia and Canada in the early part of the twentieth century. Francis Bertie Boyce (1844-1931) was the first president of the British Empire League in Australia, in 1901 (and also in 1909-11); George T. Denison (1839-1925) was the first president of the League in Canada.

The League's focus on the celebration of the birthday of Queen Victoria - 24 May - as a patriotic holiday was, in Australia, not only an observance of the holiday in schools, but also a wider opportunity to demonstrate loyalty to Britain; Empire Day was officially adopted by the Reid government in 1905 and observed for more than fifty years. The League sponsored a monthly Australian publication, United Australia, which featured on its cover Britannia and the motto "One people one destiny".
