= 17th (Service) Battalion, King's Royal Rifle Corps (British Empire League) =

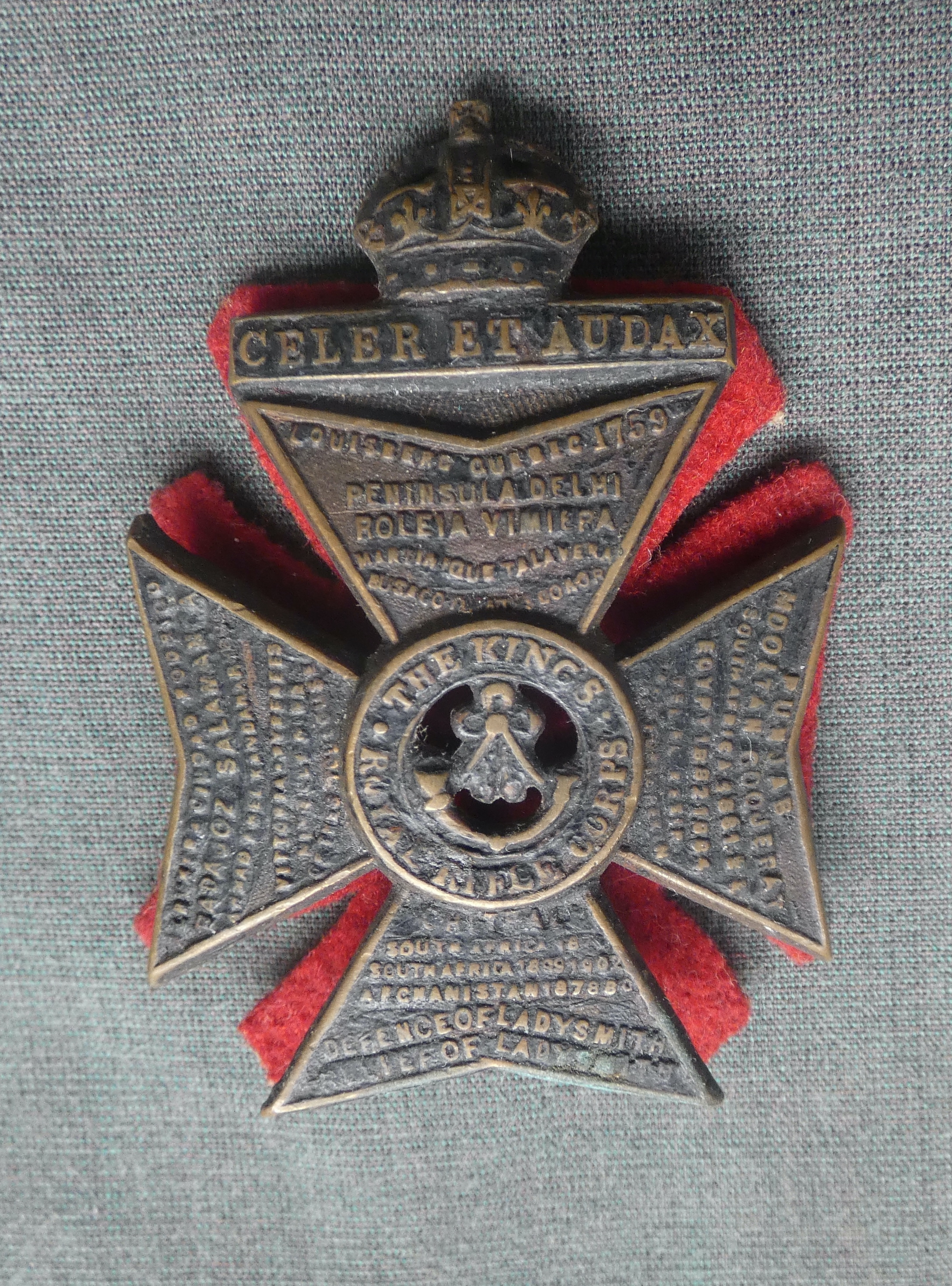
- Cap badge of the King's Royal Rifle Corps
- Active: 16 April 1915–June 1919
- Allegiance: United Kingdom
- Branch: New Army
- Type: Pals battalion
- Role: Infantry
- Size: One Battalion
- Part of: 39th Division
- Garrison/HQ: City of London
- Patron: British Empire League
- Engagements: Battle of the Somme; Battle of the Ancre; Third Battle of Ypres; German spring offensive

The 17th (Service) Battalion, King's Royal Rifle Corps (British Empire League), (17th KRRC) was an infantry unit recruited by the British Empire League as part of 'Kitchener's Army' in World War I. It served on the Western Front, including the battles of the Somme and the Ancre, the Third Battle of Ypres and the German spring offensives. After its losses the battalion was reduced to a training cadre for the rest of the war, helping to prepare newly arrived US troops and others for Trench warfare. It was disbanded in 1919.

== Recruitment and training ==
Alfred Leete's recruitment poster for Kitchener's Army.

On 6 August 1914, less than 48 hours after Britain's declaration of war, Parliament sanctioned an increase of 500,000 men for the Regular British Army. The newly appointed Secretary of State for War, Earl Kitchener of Khartoum, issued his famous call to arms: 'Your King and Country Need You', urging the first 100,000 volunteers to come forward. Men flooded into the recruiting offices and the 'first hundred thousand' were enlisted within days. This group of six divisions with supporting arms became known as Kitchener's First New Army, or 'K1'. The K2, K3 and K4 battalions, brigades and divisions followed soon afterwards. But the flood of volunteers overwhelmed the ability of the Army to absorb them, and the K5 units were largely raised by local initiative rather than at regimental depots, often from men from particular localities or backgrounds who wished to serve together: these were known as 'Pals battalions'. The 'Pals' phenomenon quickly spread across the country, as local recruiting committees offered complete units to the War Office (WO). One such organisation was the British Empire League (BEL), which advocated unity for the British Empire and had previously raised troops for service in the Second Boer War. On 16 April 1915 it was authorised to raise the 17th (Service) Battalion, King's Royal Rifle Corps (British Empire League), and began recruiting, with headquarters (HQ) at Norfolk House, Laurence Pountney Hill, in the City of London. Lieutenant-Colonel L. Whitehead (formerly of the 1st Surrey Rifles) was appointed to command the battalion on 19 April.

The volunteers were billeted in Pimlico and parades were held at Devonshire House in Piccadilly, and in Green Park. Lord Cowdray then made the Paddockhurst estate, near Worth, West Sussex, available to the battalion for training. As the men were attested and uniformed, they were sent to Paddockhurst in batches of about a hundred during June, HQ following on 28 June while Norfolk House was kept open as a recruiting office. Clothing and other equipment was supplied by the BEL under a contract with the Army & Navy Stores. Once the battalion had been formally transferred from the BEL to the WO on 1 August, the BEL began raising a second battalion, which became the 20th KRRC (British Empire League Pioneers).

17th KRRC formally became part of 117th Brigade when that was formed on 15 July 1915 in 39th Division. It was brigaded with the 16th (Chatsworth Rifles) and 17th (Welbeck Rangers) Service Battalions of the Sherwood Foresters (SF) and the 16th (Service) Battalion, Rifle Brigade (St Pancras) (16th RB). In September the battalion moved to Hursley Park, near Winchester, where the division was forming. The two depot companies (E and F) remained at Paddockhurst. On 29 September 117th Bde moved to Marlborough Lines at Aldershot, with 17th KRRC occupying Ramillies Barracks and part of Tournay Barracks. The battalion then began progressive training, at platoon, company and finally battalion level, while specialist sections such as machine gunners, signallers and bombers were formed and trained. On 8 November 17th KRRC carried out a route march to Witley Camp in Surrey, where training emphasised entrenching; apart from a brief spell back at Tournay Barracks Aldershot in January 1916 to carry out its musketry course with newly issued rifles, 17th KRRC remained at Witley for the rest of its training. Lieutenant-Col Whitehead having been on sick leave since 15 September, first Captain A.C. Oppenheim (5th Bn London Regiment) then Lt-Col Sladen from 30 November and finally Major J.A. Methuen (Southern Rhodesia Volunteers) from 10 December took temporary command of the battalion. Lieutenant-Col Whitehead relinquished the command on 5 December and Lt-Col E.F. Ward, a retired KRRC captain, took over the permanent command on 13 December, with Maj Methuen as second-in-command.

In October the depot companies of the battalion, together with those of 16th (S) Bn, KRRC (Church Lads Brigade), went to Bexhill-on-Sea to form 19th (Reserve) Bn, KRRC, as a local reserve battalion to supply reinforcement drafts to the two service battalions. It sent a number of drafts to 17th KRRC during its final training.

== Service ==
39th Division's insignia.

Mobilisation orders were received on 18 February, and after some delays 17th KRRC began boarding three trains on 7 March bound for Southampton Docks to embark for France with 34 officers and 991 other ranks (ORs). It landed at Le Havre next day, and then went by train and marching to 117th Bde's concentration area at Steenbecque in the First Army area. 117th Brigade was attached to the experienced 8th Division for its introduction to Trench warfare, 17th KRRC going to Bac-Saint-Maur, near Sailly-sur-la-Lys, where companies from the battalion were attached to the 2nd Bn Lincolnshire Regiment and 2nd Bn Berkshire Regiment. Here it suffered its first few casualties. On completion of this attachment on 27 March the battalion marched to billets at Gonnehem outside Estaires, where training continued.

On 6 April 17th KRRC moved to Béthune, going into the front line trenches of the Cuinchy sector next day. It began a routine of spells in the line interspersed with spells in billets, when working parties were constantly required. There was a trickle of casualties both in the line and among working parties from shellfire and occasional bombing exchanges with the enemy. On 21 April one officer and 35 ORs were transferred from 17th KRRC to help form 117th Brigade Machine Gun Company. After a spell in the support line the battalion took over the trenches in the Festubert sector at the end of April, and then continued rotating with the other battalions between support and the trenches at Festubert and Givenchy. The defences at Festubert comprised a series of 'islands' in the waterlogged countryside, and one of C Company's islands was raided by the enemy on 27/28 June, though the garrison (1 non-commissioned officer (NCO) and 6 men) and their neighbours put up a strong resistance and the raiders failed to obtain any prisoners for identification. A retaliatory raid by17th KRRC two nights later was also unsuccessful, the artillery failing to cut the enemy barbed wire sufficiently. Another raid by the battalion on 11 July employed a Bangalore torpedo to cut the wire, but there was a second belt and the raiders came under heavy fire and suffered casualties.

=== Somme ===
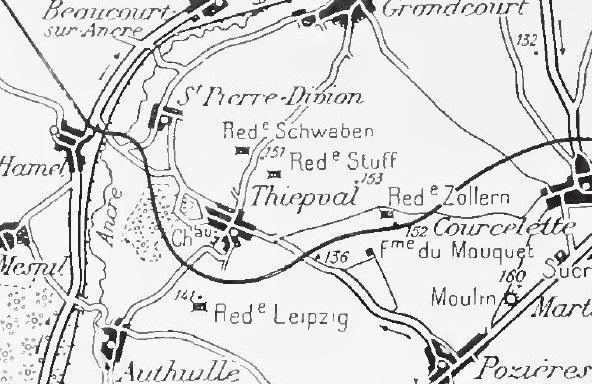
The Ancre Heights in 1916.

The Somme Offensive had been going on since 1 July, and on 11 August 39th Division was ordered to march south to join in. 17th KRRC reached Authie, near Doullens on 25 August and officers and NCOs reconnoitred the trenches they were to take over. From 29 August the battalion stood by at X Camp at Bertrancourt, awaiting orders from Reserve Army to go up to the front. Reserve Army began a series of minor operations along the River Ancre in early September. On 3 September 39th Division was ordered to secure a few hundred yards of high ground north-west of St Pierre-Divion, to cover the flank of 49th (West Riding) Division advancing up the river valley. The left attack was made at 05.10 by 117th Bde, with 16th RB and 17th SF leading, while 17th KRRC in support moved up to occupy the British front line. The attacking battalions got into the enemy front trench, but then called for urgent support. 17th KRRC sent B and C Companies across No man's land to assist, suffering heavy casualties (including all the officers) on the way. Nevertheless, small parties from the battalion got into the German trench and began working their way up the communication trenches. One party of two sergeants and 10 ORs made it almost to the German second line, and then held their ground for five hours, both sergeants being killed. The rifleman who took command held the party together until they ran out of grenades, when he withdrew them to the British line. Runners were unable to get through the enemy barrage to get news back to Battalion HQ. About 12.00 A and D Companies assembled in No Man's land to support 16th RB. However, it was clear that 117th Bde's assault had failed, and at 13.00 orders arrived to withdraw the battalion to the British lines, which was made difficult by the scattering of small parties and the heavy enemy shellfire. The battalion was relieved that evening and returned to Bertrancourt. It had gone into action with 21 officers and 635 ORs, and had lost 11 officers killed or died of wounds, 37 ORs killed, 161 wounded and 106 missing.

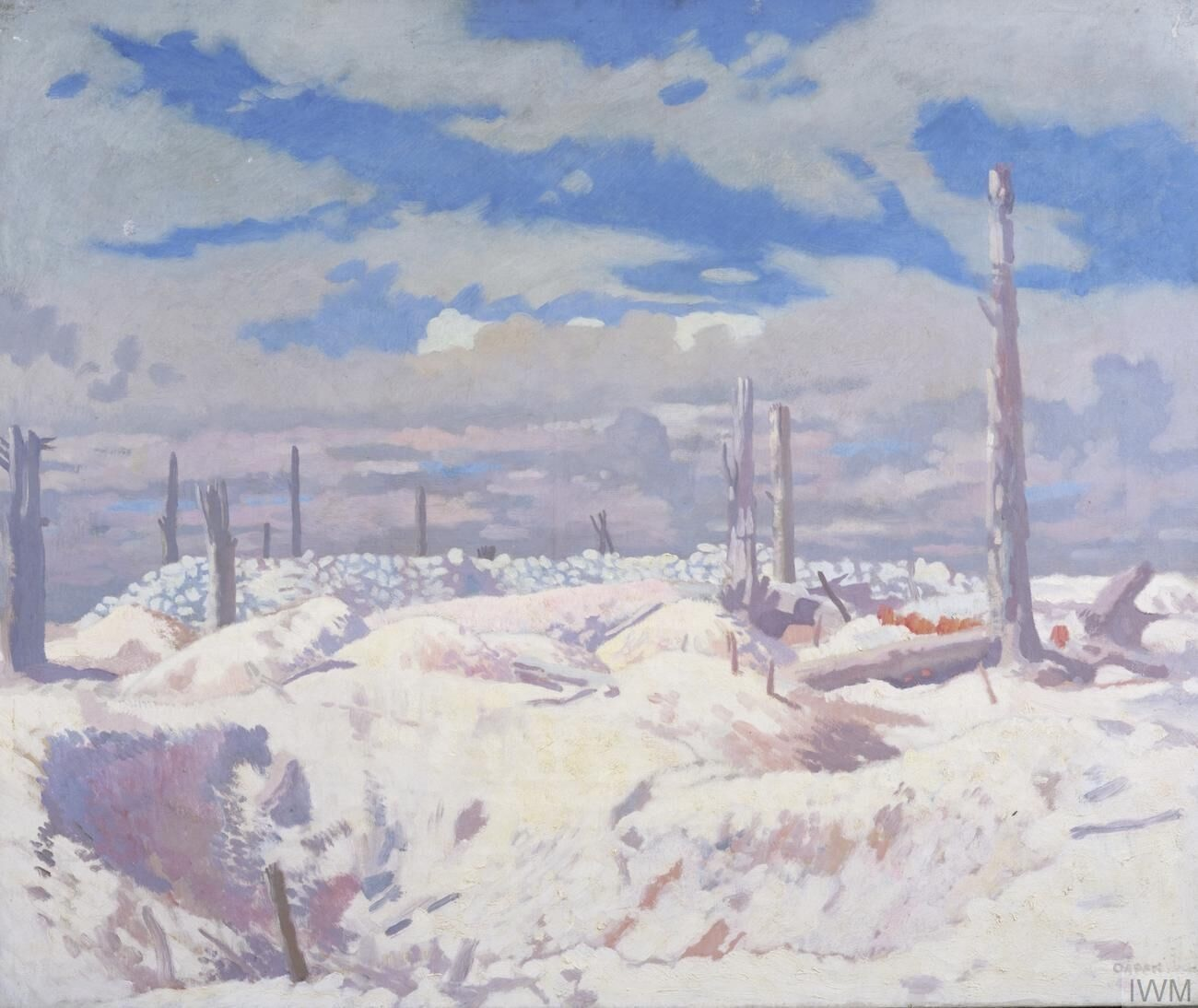
Schwaben Redoubt by William Orpen.

Three days later the battalion was back in the front line at Auchonvillers, where it was joined by a draft of 102 reinforcements. On 14 September, when it was in support at Mailly-Maillet, it received a further 205 reinforcements from 2nd Entrenching Battalion (the men had trained in England with the 3/5th Battalion, London Regiment (London Rifle Brigade)). 39th Division entered the Battle of the Ancre Heights on 5 October and 17th KRRC moved up into brigade reserve in Authuille Wood, with three companies in the captured 'Leipzig Salient'. On 8 October Maj Methuen led up B and C Companies to support 16th SF, who were holding the southern face of the much fought-over 'Schwaben Redoubt'. That evening the whole battalion relieved the Foresters, establishing HQ in the ruins of Thiepval. On 12 October the battalion was put under the orders of 118th Bde, and two days later supported 4th/5th Black Watch, who attacked to complete the Capture of Schwaben Redoubt. At about 17.15 the Black Watch requested help to clear part of the enemy trench, and Maj Methuen took up B and C Companies, completing the task by 02.00 on 15 October. The enemy kept up a heavy bombardment of the position, and put in two counter-attacks in the morning, which were driven back with heavy casualties to the attackers, and a number of prisoners taken. 17th KRRC was relieved from the Schwaben on 16 October, having suffered casualties of 11 ORs killed, 38 wounded and 13 missing, with further losses suffered by working parties over the following days.

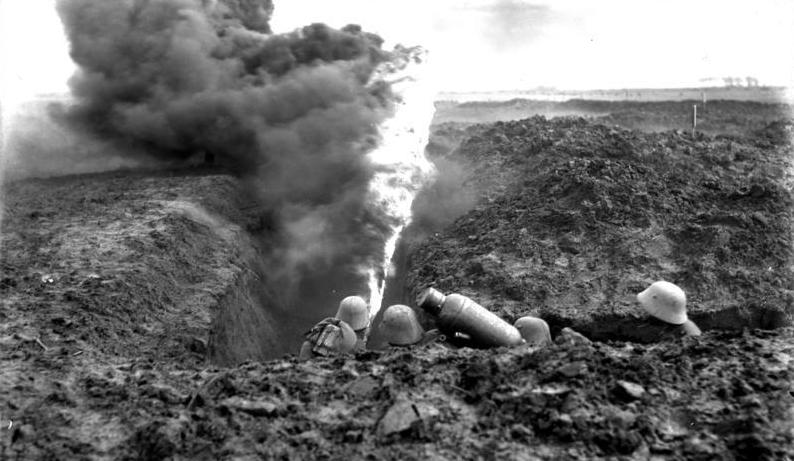
German flamethrower troops in training.

17th KRRC returned to the Schwaben on 20 October. Part of 39th Division was to capture 'Stuff Trench' next day, with 117th Bde carrying out a subsidiary attack at 12.00. Beforehand, 17th KRRC in the Schwaben came under heavy attack. It began with an intense bombardment of the front line between 04.45 and 05.00; the barrage then lifted to the support and communication trenches while the attackers came in with grenades and flammenwerfers (flamethrowers). They gained footings in the trenches at Point 19 (left, held by A Company) and Point 99 (centre, held by C Company), but were thrown out after fierce fighting after B Company rushed up reinforcements from battalion reserve. The positions were securely held again by 08.00 and the battalion had captured 4 officers, 80 ORs and two flamethrowers, out of an attacking force estimated at 400, for the loss of 2 officers and 15 ORs killed or died of wounds, 1 officer and 66 ORs wounded, and 7 missing. Later a platoon from B Company established a link to Stuff Trench, which had been successfully taken. The battalion received a draft of 58 ORs and continued to do spells of frontline duty in the Schwaben over the following weeks.

Reserve Army (now Fifth Army) launched a new offensive (the Battle of the Ancre) on 13 November. 17th KRRC moved to South Bluffs, Authuille, to act as divisional reserve for an attack from the Stuff and Schwaben on the 'Hansa Line' and St Pierre-Divion, which had thwarted 39th Division in September. The divisional attack was entirely successful and the battalion moved up to form the support lines to the troops occupying St Pierre-Divion. Its only casualty was one man wounded, and it was joined by a draft of 217 reinforcements that day. It was relieved on 14 November and began a journey north by road and rail to join Second Army, where 39th Division went into rest billets in Merckeghem.

=== Winter 1916–17 ===
On 13 December 17th KRRC took up reserve positions in the Ypres Salient, with two companies in dugouts on the canal bank and HQ and the remainder at Château des Trois Tours. It was joined by a draft of 150 reinforcements, but complained that 130 were only partially trained and had to complete their training under battalion arrangements. It then began doing tours of duty in the front line in the Canal Sector, later at Potije and Zillebeke, suffering a steady drain of casualties. Drafts of 25 and then 78 (64 untrained) reinforcements arrived during March. On 12 March 1917 Lt-Col Ward left for England and was succeeded in command by Maj Methuen. The adjutant, Capt J. Groombridge, was promoted to second-in-command, and then had to assume command on 5 April when Lt-Col Methuen was wounded. Major H.C. Bridges (North Staffordshire Regiment) arrived from attachment to 16th RB to take over on 16 April, until Lt-Col A.P.H. Le Prevost (KRRC) assumed permanent command. During the month the battalion's platoons began training in the new offensive tactics. The routine of trench duty and working parties continued until 1 July, when the battalion went by rail to the Serques area where it underwent special training over model trenches for the forthcoming Ypres Offensive. Emphasis was given to methods for overcoming the new concrete 'pillboxes' the Germans were constructing. 17th KRRC returned to the front line at Hill Top and Canal Bank on 28 July.

=== Ypres ===
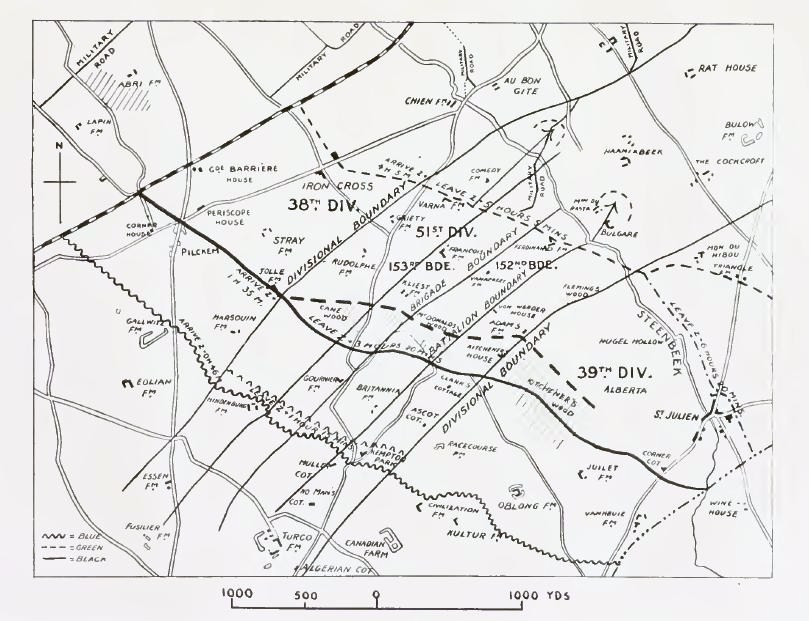
The northern part of the Battle of Pilckem Ridge, 31 July 1917.

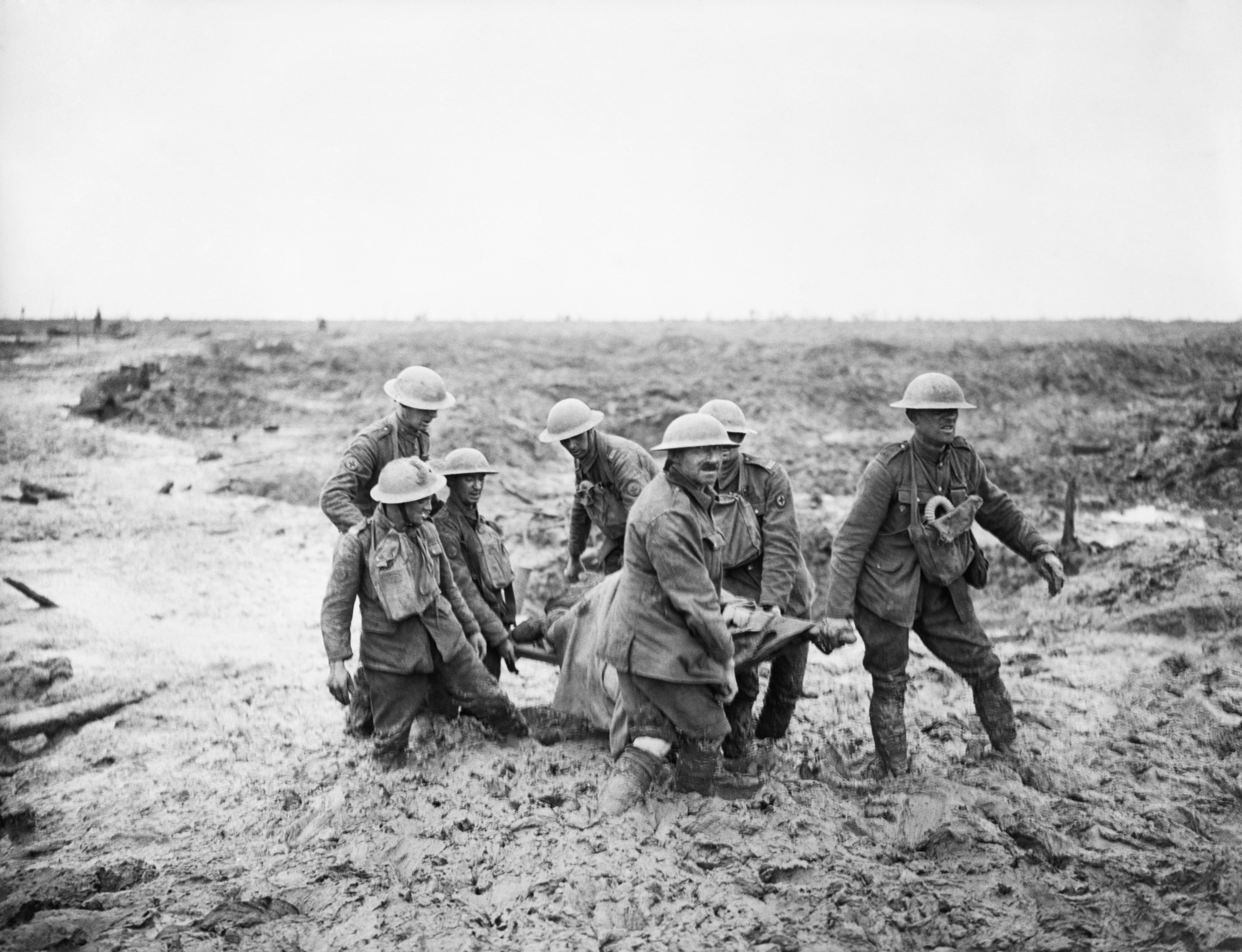
Stretcher-bearers struggle through the mud after the Battle of Pilckem Ridge, 1 August 1917 (Photograph by John Warwick Brooke).

The offensive opened with the Battle of Pilckem Ridge on 31 July 1917 after 12 days' bombardment of the German positions. 17th KRRC, attacking on the extreme left of 39th Division, was given five successive objectives: 1. German front line (Yellow); 2. 'Canadian Farm' (Brown); 3. Close support line (Red); 4. Support line (Blue); 5. 'Civilisation Farm' (White), the whole being referred to as the 'German Front Line System' constituting the division's first objective for the day. The battalion completed its assembly in 'Hornby' and 'Bellingham' trenches at Zero minus 3 hours, when it was already raining. At Zero minus 5 minutes 500 oil drums were projected onto the German front line by mortars (the resulting fires helped the attackers keep direction), and at Zero (03.50, about half an hour before dawn) the British barrage of artillery and machine gun fire came down and the assault troops moved out into No man's land. Then at Zero plus six minutes the barrage lifted off the enemy front line and began creeping forward, while the first wave of attackers went in. 17th KRRC's first wave consisted of one platoon of A Company and two of B Company. They found the German front trench 'badly knocked about' by the artillery, and met little resistance, the surviving defenders being taken prisoner. Canadian Farm was taken by a platoon of A Company, then the remainder of A and B Companies took the Red line, C and D took the Blue line, and finally Civilisation Farm was captured by a platoon of C Company. The battalion settled down to consolidate a line about 70 yards (64 m) in front of the Blue line under a protective barrage. The barrage moved on at Zero plus 20 minutes, and the first wave of 16th RB passed through towards their own first objective of 'Kitchener's Wood'. Resistance was hardening, but the first two companies of 16th RB took Kitchener's Wood and the rest moved on to the Steenbeek stream, digging in just beyond. 118th Brigade then passed through at 10.30 to attack the division's final set of objectives, but at this point the plan began to break down. 118th Brigade fell back before counter-attacks, although protective barrages stopped the Germans about 300 yards (270 m) in front of the Steenbeek, which became the British front line. 17th KRRC sent up C and D Companies to reinforce 16th RB holding this line. 17th KRRCs casualties in the day amounted to 1 officer and 5 ORs killed, 1 officer and 60 ORs wounded, and 8 missing. 39th Division's attack was the most successful of a disappointing day. Under incessant rain, the Steenbeek valley became a morass, and simply maintaining positions was an ordeal. 117th Brigade was supposed to have been relieved on the night of 31 July/1 August, but 118th Bde had been much harder hit, and 117th remained in position. 17th KRRC was withdrawn during the night of 2/3 August but only to relieve a battalion of 116th Bde in the front line at St Julien. It was relieved itself on 5 August and went back to the dugouts at Canal Bank. Since 31 July it had suffered another 24 ORs killed and about 120 more wounded; in addition 60 men had been evacuated sick, many with Trench foot from working in the flooded trenches.

On 7 August the battalion was withdrawn by rail to a camp at Berthen to reorganise and train, and then went up by motor buses on 13 August to a forward camp at 'Ridge Wood' (where it was subjected to shelling and night bombing attacks by aircraft). It carried out some very short spells of duty in the front line but played no part in the Battle of Langemarck, 16–18 August. It began training on 4 September at Steenvoorde for the next operation, the Battle of the Menin Road Ridge on 20 September. It went into Divisional Reserve in Ridge Wood on 15 September, and into its assembly position in 'Ravine Wood' by 03.00 on 20 September. The plan was for 16th RB on the left of 117th Bde to advance at Zero and capture the Red line, after which A, B and C Companies of 17th KRRC would pass through to capture and consolidate the Blue line while D Company continued on to the Green line. All went well to begin with: the first line was taken by 06.00, and 17th KRRC and the other follow-up battalions went through at 07.08. Although it suffered badly from machine gun fire from the left, the battalion rushed the second objective. However, the brigade to the left had failed to get forward, and 17th KRRC had to form a defensive flank for 117th Bde rather than go on to the Green line. Casualties had been heavy – two of the companies ended the day being commanded by corporals – and amounted to 2 officers and 39 ORs killed and died of wounds, 5 officers and 132 ORs evacuated wounded, 19 missing. It was relieved the same day and went back to the Larch Wood Tunnels, where a draft of 76 reinforcements arrived, followed by others later in the month. 39th Division attacked again on 26 September (the Battle of Polygon Wood) but 117th Bde was in divisional reserve and 17th KRRC was not engaged.

=== Winter 1917–18 ===
17th KRRC spent the whole of October training and integrating new officers and men, then resumed spells of frontline duty as the Ypres campaign wound down. In December the battalion was again withdrawn for rest and reorganisation. It went back into brigade reserve at Hill Top Farm Camp in the Canal Bank sector on 30 December, then into brigade support at Irish Farm Camp on 15 January 1918. 39th Division was relieved on 21 January and moved south to Heudicourt, joining Fifth Army, which had taken over the sector facing St Quentin. 17th KRRC alternated with 16th RB in the front line, carrying out occasional raids.

=== Spring offensive ===
The long-anticipated German spring offensive began on 21 March. At the time 39th Division was out of the line in GHQ Reserve, but its huts came under heavy shellfire when the bombardment began at 04.30. 117th Brigade (commanded by Lt-Col Le Prevost in the absence of the brigadier) ordered 17th KRRC under Maj Edward Fairlie to assemble at Sorel Wood, and it suffered a number of casualties in doing so. At 19.00 117th Bde moved to a position south-east of Saulcourt to dig in along the 'Saulcourt Switch Line' and protect the exposed right flank of 21st Division. At dawn on 22 March the brigade came under heavy attack, and at noon 17th KRRC, in reserve, was ordered to send two companies up to each of the other two battalions, extending their left and right flanks. The attacks continued through the afternoon, and C & D Companies suffered heavy casualties as 16th RB was almost surrounded at 15.00. About 16th RB was driven out of its position, and A & B Companies of 17th KRRC were sent back to Tincourt Wood in the 'Green Line' (the rearmost defensive position) to cover the withdrawal there of the whole brigade, where C & D Companies rejoined and were placed in close support. The following morning (23 March) dawn broke with a heavy mist through which the enemy attacked in great numbers. 117th Brigade only had 17th KRRC in the front line in Tincourt Wood, and fierce fighting broke out along its whole front, but the enemy had actually fallen back when orders arrived for the battalion to withdraw. The whole of 39th Division was being forced to retreat by the collapse of 21st Division's position. The battalion disengaged without difficulty, covered by a platoon each from A and B Companies. 117th Brigade took up position about 13.00 between Bossu and Aizecourt-le-Haut, with 17th KRRC in support. However, the enemy attack was becoming very heavy all along the front, and 39th Division was again ordered to retire. 17th KRRC went back to a position near Mont Saint-Quentin, but had only been there half an hour when it was ordered further back to Cléry-sur-Somme. By now the roads were clogged with retreating transport (cross-country movement over the old Somme battlefield being almost impossible for vehicles) and the Cléry road was under shellfire, the vehicles being diverted onto a railway track. The brigade made a stand on the Mont St Quentin ridge and then on the Cléry road to allow the transport to get away, and then went back to Cléry at 17.00 to cover the Somme crossings. With the enemy lapping round its flank, 117th Bde crossed the Somme Canal by the wooden bridge at Cléry under shellfire and air attack before it was blown up by the engineers. The depleted battalions of 117th Bde then went into reserve to get some hot food and a night's rest.

At 07.00 next morning (24 March) 117th Bde took up a position on the canal bank at Feuillères, with 17th KRRC astride the Feuillères–Hem-Monacu road and thus responsible for the bridgehead. The Actions at the Somme Crossings began that morning: fighting took place at Cléry, but no attacks were made on 117th Bde. Following the arrival of the brigadier, Lt-Col Le Prevost returned to command 17th KRRC. That night 17th KRRC sent strong patrols across the canal and got word that the division holding Hem was withdrawing. About 02.00 a German patrol approached the bridge at Feuillères; 17th KRRC withdrew its own patrol and the engineers destroyed the bridge. During 25 March the battalion saw large numbers of Germans moving along the north bank of the canal towards Curlu, and caused many casualties among them with rifle and Lewis gun fire. However, formations to the left had given way, and 17th KRRC was ordered back at 02.00 to a line of trenches between Herbécourt and Frise. At dawn the Germans launched a heavy attack (the Battle of Rosières) and at 08.00 118th Bde on the battalion's right began to fall back. 17th KRRC covered its retreat, and then made a fighting withdrawal itself to a position astride the Cappy–Herbécourt road south of Éclusier. Then at 11.00 the battalion was ordered back to Proyart, during which it was covered by the divisional pioneer battalion, 13th Gloucestershire Regiment (Forest of Dean). By 17.00 117th Bde had established a strong line in front of Proyart, with 17th KRRC in the centre. It was heavily shelled during the night. The German attack was renewed at 08.00 on 27 March, making no progress against 39th Division. However the enemy got through between Proyart and the Somme, forcing 117th Bde to form a defensive flank, falling back at 11.00 to a position between Morcourt and the Amiens road. Lieutenant-Col Le Prevost was wounded at this time and Maj Fairlie resumed command of 17th KRRC. About 12.15 117th Bde was forced to give up about 1,000 yards (910 m) more ground, but it then formed up and counter-attacked, regaining its line south of Morcourt. By 18.00 it was firmly established, and the enemy could be seen similarly digging in on a ridge outside Proyart, about 1,000 yards (910 m) away.

=== Composite units ===
Casualties had been so heavy that 17th KRRC and 16th RB were temporarily reorganised as a composite battalion under Lt-Col the Hon Edward Coke of 16th RB. During the night the enemy pushed along the south bank of the Somme, taking both Morcourt and Lamotte, which was behind 39th Division's flank. Orders arrived at 04.00 to continue the retreat, and the Rifle Battalion pulled back at 06.00, suffering heavy casualties from shellfire. By 13.00 117th Bde had taken up a position along the Marcelcave–Cayeux-en-Santerre road, with the combined Rifle Battalion in the centre. Several attacks on this line were broken up with rifle and Lewis gun fire, and the Rifles caught some enemy guns unlimbering up at 1,700 yards (1,600 m) and firing on them with good results. During the night the division again fell back, 117th Bde pulling out by 03.00 and forming up along the Démuin–Marcelcave road, the battalions reorganising and sorting out stragglers. The next day (29 March) was uneventful, and early on 30 March the division was withdrawn into reserve in a wood 2,000 yards (1,800 m) north-west of Aubercourt. However, the enemy attacked the front line troops heavily, driving them back, and in the afternoon 39th Division delivered a counter-attack. During this attack Maj Fairlie was killed (his body was never found and he is commemorated on the Pozières Memorial.) The counter-attack gained a temporary success, but at 17.00 the line was forced back again. 3rd Australian Division then passed through and delivered an effective counter-attack, allowing 39th Division finally to be withdrawn to Villers-Bretonneux. It then marched back to Longueau, east of Amiens, arriving at 06.00 on 31 March, where the men were given a hot meal and billeted in the village. Here 17th KRRC was re-established as a separate unit under the command of the adjutant, Capt W.R. Low. Its losses in the operation had been 2 officers and 17 ORs killed, 7 officers and 181 ORs wounded, 4 officers and 163 ORs missing.

The survivors of 117th Bde were taken by lorry to Bovelles, and then marched by stages and by train, arriving on 10 April in the Saint-Omer area where 39th Division was concentrating behind Second Army. The plan had been to use the much-reduced division to train divisions of the American Expeditionary Forces now arriving on the Western Front. However, Second Army had been depleted to send troops south to help stem the German offensive, and then on 9 April it was attacked itself (the Battle of the Lys). 39th Division was its only reserve – even though each brigade was now hardly stronger than a single battalion – and the division was ordered to organise a composite brigade from its units to go back into the line. '39th Composite Brigade' comprised four battalions, of which 117th Bde formed No 3 under Lt-Col Coke (16th RB), with one and a half companies (6 officers and 333 ORs) provided by 17th KRRC, half a company by 16th RB and two companies by 16th SF, the battalion supported by the quartermaster's stores of 17th KRRC. No 3 Battalion went up to Ridge Wood Camp under 21st Division on 14 April, where it was shelled and suffered casualties. Meanwhile, the 'details' of 17th KRRC left behind under Capt Low moved to Recques outside St Omer. Lieutenant-Col C.H.N. Seymour arrived to take over command of 17th KRRC. He was a Regular KRRC officer and had already commanded several service battalions of the regiment. He was immediately assigned to form a fifth battalion for the composite brigade from the remaining details of the division. A & B Companies of No 5 Battalion were provided by 117th Bde (101 men from 17th KRRC), C by 116th Bde, D by 118th Bde and the pioneers of 13th Gloucesters, supported by 17th KRRC's 1st Line transport. On 14 April it went to Borre, near Hazebrouck, and was attached to 1st Australian Division.

The composite brigade fought in a number of actions with XXII Corps. On 16 April the two Rifle companies of 3rd Bn were in support while the rest counter-attacked on Wytschaete Ridge. Next day the battalion came under the orders of 9th (Scottish) Division, with the two Rifle companies (C & D) attached to 1st South African Regiment, suffering numerous casualties from the incessant shellfire. From 20 April they were at Awapuni Lines, near Dickebusch, providing working parties, until the battalion was shelled out of its camp on 25 April and had to form a defensive flank towards the Vierstraat crossroads. The enemy broke through over the crossroads, and the KRRC/RB company took up a position from Ridge Wood to 'Confusion Corner', about 500 yards (460 m) north-east of Vierstraat. It maintained this position until 14.00 next day, when the enemy were seen massing behind Vierstraat. The British artillery came down on this concentration, and combined with the rifle and machine gun of the defenders this attack was broken up. The company was later moved back to the GHQ Second Line and then to a camp at Outerdom where it remained, although it was shelled out of the camp into an old trench line on 29 April. Casualties had been so heavy – the 17th KRRC contingent lost 3 officers wounded, 19 ORs killed, 83 wounded and 16 missing – that Nos 2 and 3 Composite Bns were amalgamated into one. However, the crisis had passed. No 5 Battalion under Lt-Col Seymour rejoined 39th Division on 30 April, the 17th KRRC contingent having lost 1 man killed and 1 wounded, the remainder of the Composite Brigade arriving on 5 May.

=== Training cadre ===
While the Composite Brigade was detached, 39th Division had begun training troops of the 77th US Infantry Division. Officer and NCO instructors from 17th KRRC were attached to 2nd Bn, 307th Infantry Regiment, at Tournehem and 1st Bn, 308th Infantry Regiment, at Zutkerque. Major Groombridge returned to duty, and was immediately sent to command the details of 16th RB. During May the infantry units of 39th Division were reduced to training cadres (TCs). A TC generally comprised 10 officers and 45 ORs; on 16 May the surplus men of 17th KRRC (265 ORs) and the battalion transport (32 ORs) were sent to the base depot to reinforce other units. A large number of TCs from other formations also joined the division.

In mid-May 2/307 and 1/308 US Regiments moved to the Third Army area, accompanied by their instructors, who returned to 17th KRRC on 25 May. At the end of the month 2nd Bn, 117th Infantry Regiment, and 1st and 2nd Bns, 118th Infantry Regiment, of 30th US Division arrived at Recques, Zutkerque, Nortbécourt and Inginghem for instruction. On 26 June 117th Bde HQ left to begin training the 80th US Division, and battalion HQ of 17th KRRC became HQ of 'E Brigade, Training Group' commanding TCs remaining at Recques, with Lt-Col Seymour as acting brigade commander and Capt Low as acting Brigade major. Lieutenant-Col Le Prevost returned to duty as CO of the 17th KRRC TC on 30 June. 30th US Division left for II US Corps area at the beginning of July, accompanied by Lt-Cols Seymour (with 59th Bde) and Le Prevost (with 118th Rgt) until 20 July. 117th Brigade HQ returned to the training group at the end of July and resumed command of the TCs. Lieutenant-Col Le Prevost remained with 17th KRRC until the end of the war, while Lt-Col Seymour went to command 16th KRRC during the final battles before the Armistice with Germany.

On 16 August the TC of 17th KRRC was transferred to 66th (2nd East Lancashire) Division, which was also composed of TCs. From 23 August it was at Haudricourt, setting up a reinforcement camp, and then a camp for malaria cases among the reinforcements from the Salonika Front. On 18 September the 17th KRRC TC was sent to Cayeux-sur-Mer to form a battalion from under-age and immature recruits from a large number of different regiments. By early October, these troops were being used to guard German prisoners-of-war at Abbeville and escorting them aboard ships bound for camps in England. On 20 September 66th Division began reforming for active service, less its 197th Bde which transferred with the TCs to Line of Communication duties at Drucat. Until after the Armistice 17th KRRC's cadre continued to administer its young soldier battalion, with a large number of officers attached from other regiments. 197th Brigade came under 39th Division from 18 November. On 22 February 1919 the remaining cadre (4 officers and 47 ORs) of 17th KRRC went to run No 2 Rest Camp, which was being used as the embarkation camp for Canadian troops returning home. On 30 June the cadre was officially disbanded, Lt-Col Le Prevost continuing as commandant of the rest camp with the remaining personnel absorbed into the camp staff until their turn came for demobilisation.

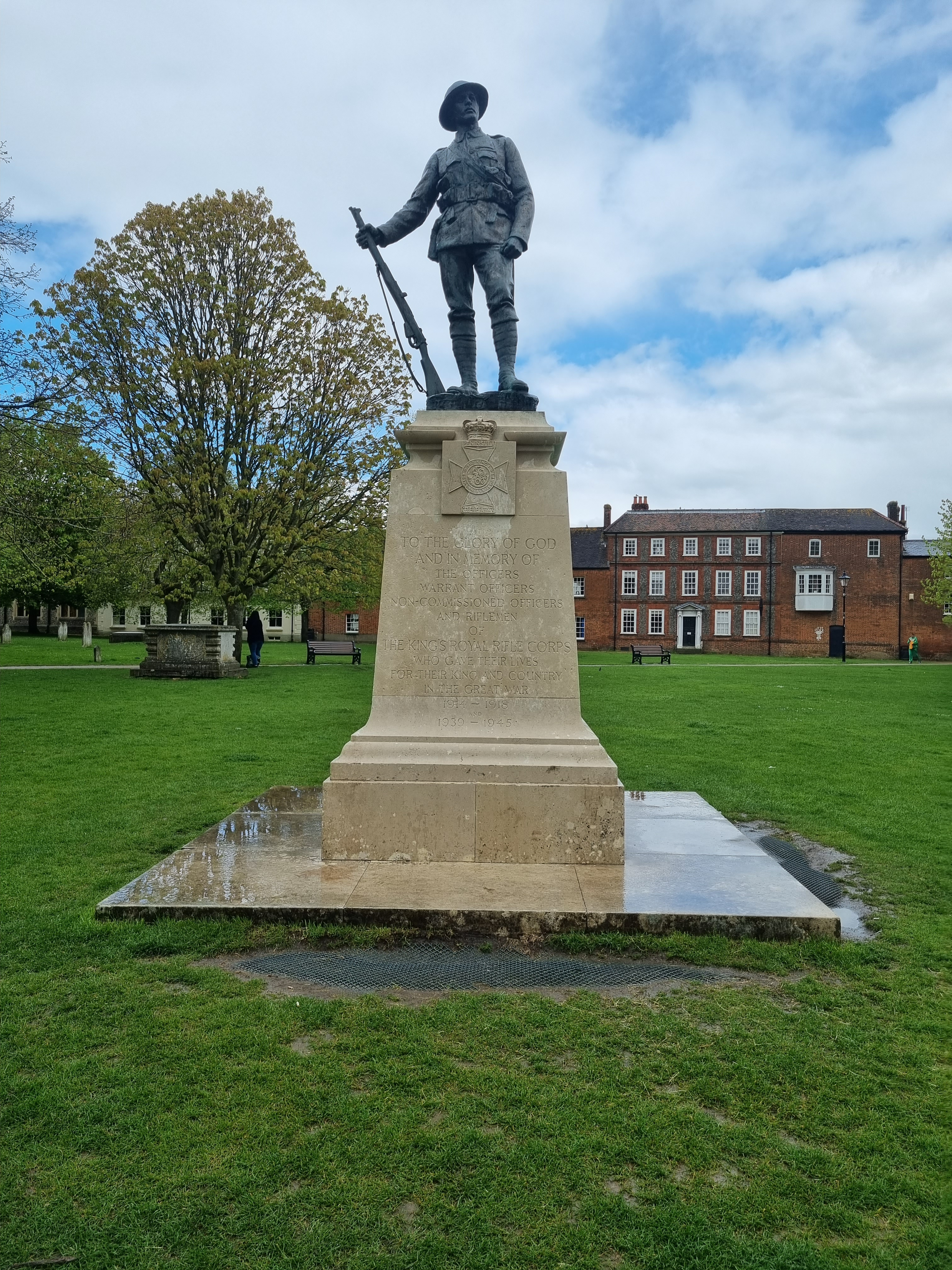
The KRRC memorial at Winchester.

== Memorial ==
The KRRC's World War I memorial, with sculpture by John Tweed, stands near the west door of Winchester Cathedral.

== Insignia ==
The battalion wore the KRRC black badge with a red backing on service caps and a 'KRR' title on the shoulder straps. Immediately on arrival in France all ranks adopted an upper arm badge of a half circle (straight edge at the bottom) in green (117th Bde's colour, but also appropriate to a rifle regiment) with a black circle in the centre. This was worn on both sleeves. The formation sign for 39th Division, also worn on the upper arm, was a white square with three light blue vertical stripes.
