= Marguerite (ship) =

French ship sunk in Lyme Bay in 1917. Now a dive site

History

France
- Name: Marguerite
- Owner: Fernand Bouet, Caen
- Builder: Osbourne, Graham & Co. Ltd., North Hylton
- Yard number: 161
- Launched: 28 November 1911
- Fate: Sunk 28 June 1917

General characteristics
- Type: Cargo ship
- Tonnage: 1,544 GRT
- Length: 79 m (259 ft 2 in)
- Beam: 11 m (36 ft 1 in)
- Depth: 4.9 m (16 ft 1 in)
- Propulsion: 1 × 189 nhp triple expansion engine
- Speed: 10 knots (19 km/h; 12 mph)

Marguerite was a 1,544-ton French ship built by Osbourne, Graham & Co. Ltd. of North Hylton in Sunderland in 1912.

On 28 June 1917 she was sailing from Rouen to Swansea when she was torpedoed and sunk in Lyme Bay by the German submarine UB-40 under the command of Oberleutnant zur See Hans Howaldt. The wreck lies at 50°36′06″N 02°58′39″W.
