= Edmonton Regiment =

Edmonton Regiment may refer to:

- Edmonton Royal Rifle Regiment, a militia unit from Middlesex, England from 1853 to 1881
- The Loyal Edmonton Regiment (4th Battalion, Princess Patricia's Canadian Light Infantry), a Primary Reserve unit of the Canadian Armed Forces
