= Middlesex Militia =

Auxiliary force of the British Army

The Middlesex Militia was an auxiliary (Note: It is incorrect to describe the British Militia as 'irregular': throughout their history they were equipped and trained exactly like the line regiments of the regular army, and once embodied in time of war they were fulltime professional soldiers for the duration of their enlistment.) military force in the county of Middlesex in South East England. From their formal organisation as Trained Bands, in 1572 and their service during the Armada Crisis and in the English Civil War, the Militia regiments of Middlesex served during times of international tension and all of Britain's major wars. By 1853 there were five regiments in the county. They provided internal security and home defence but sometimes operated further afield, including France and the Mediterranean, relieving regular troops from routine garrison duties, and acting as a source of trained officers and men for the Regular Army. Some of the infantry battalions went on active service during the Second Boer War and all served as Special Reserve training units in World War I. After 1921 the militia had only a shadowy existence until its final abolition in 1953.

== Early history ==
The English militia was descended from the Anglo-Saxon Fyrd, the military force raised from the freemen of the shires under command of their Sheriff. It continued under the Norman kings. The force was reorganised under the Assizes of Arms of 1181 and 1252, and again by King Edward I's Statute of Winchester of 1285. Under this statute 'Commissioners of Array' would levy the required number of men from each shire. The usual shire contingent was 1000 infantry commanded by a millenar, divided into companies of 100 commanded by centenars or ductores, and subdivided into platoons of 20 led by vintenars. This procedure was continued for border campaigns under later kings. By now the infantry were mainly equipped with the English longbow. Edward III called out the shire levies for his 1335 campaign in Scotland, but Middlesex produced only 2 vintenars, 8 mounted archers and 37 foot archers.

== Middlesex Trained Bands ==
The legal basis of the militia was updated by two acts of 1557 covering musters (4 & 5 Ph. & M. c. 3) and the maintenance of horses and armour (4 & 5 Ph. & M. c. 2). The county militia was now under the Lord Lieutenant, assisted by the Deputy Lieutenants and Justices of the Peace. The entry into force of these Acts in 1558 is seen as the starting date for the organised county militia in England.

Middlesex was one of the southern counties called upon to send troops to suppress the Rising of the North in 1569. Although the militia obligation was universal, this assembly confirmed that it was clearly impractical to train and equip every able-bodied man. After 1572 the practice was to select a proportion of men for the Trained Bands (TBs), who were mustered for regular training. The City of London and Liberties of Westminster and the Tower Hamlets all fell within the boundaries of Middlesex but had their own militia organisations: the difference was effectively between rural and suburban parishes of Middlesex. (Note: The Tower Hamlets had their own lord lieutenant, the Constable of the Tower, and rarely mustered with the rest of the county.) The Armada Crisis in 1588 led to the mustering of the trained bands in April, when Middlesex reported 10,000 trained men (apparently including the 6000 in the four regiments of the London Trained Bands (LTBs) and the 1150 men in five companies of the Liberties). The trained bands were put on one hour's notice in June and called out on 23 July as the Armada approached. Those actually mobilised in Middlesex outside London numbered 1000, of whom 500 were untrained. In addition there were 19 'lances' (heavy cavalry) and 65 light horse and 'petronel's (the petronel was an early cavalry firearm). Westminster supplied a company of 450 men.

In the 16th Century little distinction was made between the militia and the troops levied by the counties for overseas expeditions, and between 1589 and 1601 Middlesex supplied over 1000 levies for service in Ireland, France or the Netherlands. However, the counties usually conscripted the unemployed and criminals rather than the Trained Bandsmen. Replacing the weapons issued to the levies from the militia armouries was a heavy cost on the counties.

With the passing of the threat of invasion, the trained bands declined in the early 17th Century. Later, King Charles I attempted to reform them into a national force or 'Perfect Militia' answering to the king rather than local control. In 1638 the Middlesex Trained Band consisted of 928 muskets and 653 'corslets' (pikemen with armour), together with the 80-strong Middlesex Trained Band Horse. The trained bands were called upon in 1639 and 1640 to send contingents for the Bishops' Wars, though many of the men who actually went were untrained hired substitutes. In 1640 Middlesex was ordered to hold a general muster on 24 May and then march 1200 men on 3 June to Harwich, there to be shipped to Newcastle upon Tyne on 8 June for service against the Scots.

=== Civil War ===
Control of the trained bands was one of the major points of dispute between Charles I and Parliament that led to the English Civil War. There is an often-repeated story that when Charles I returned from his Scottish campaign in October 1641 he ordered the guards on Parliament sitting at Westminster, which were provided by the City, Surrey and Middlesex TBs under command of the Puritan Robert Devereux, 3rd Earl of Essex, to be replaced by the Westminster Trained Bands (many of whose tradesmen members were purveyors to the Royal Court) under the command of the Royalist Lord Lieutenant of Middlesex, the Earl of Dorset, and that subsequently there were clashes between the new guards and the London apprentices. However, this story has been refuted in the most detailed history of the LTBs, which points out that the guards were provided by the Westminster TBs 'and the four neighbour companies' of Middlesex TBs all along, and it was only the commanders who were changed. Later the Middlesex and London TBs shared the duty.

When open war broke out between the King and Parliament, neither side made much use of the trained bands beyond securing the county armouries for their own full-time troops. The main exception was the London area, where the LTBs together with the suburban regiments constituted Parliament's reserve, available for short campaigns. In November 1642 the TBs reinforced the Earl of Essex's army and helped to repulse the Royalists at the Battle of Turnham Green. By that month there were 13 companies of foot in Middlesex.

=== Lines of Communication ===
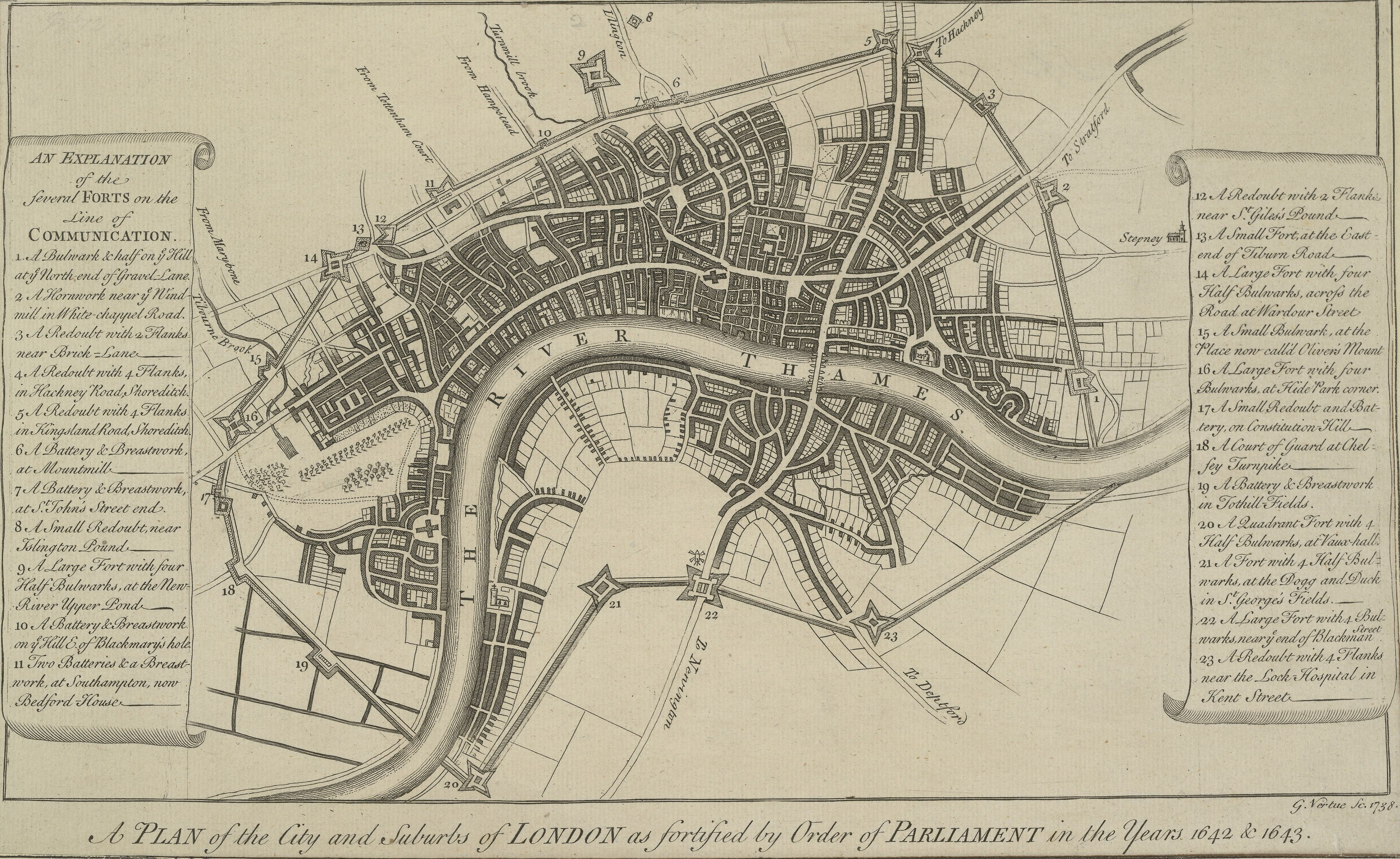
George Vertue's 1738 plan of the London Lines of Communication

London had long outgrown the old city walls. During the Edgehill campaign the citizens had erected breastworks across all the streets leading to open country and set up guard posts manned by the LTBs – 20 companies were on duty each night. Then in the winter of 1642–3 volunteer work gangs of citizens constructed a massive entrenchment and rampart round the City and its suburbs, enclosing the whole of Westminster and the Tower Hamlets and several other Middlesex parishes. Known as the Lines of Communication, studded with some 23 forts and redoubts, these defences were about 11 miles (18 km) long, making it the most extensive series of city defences in 17th century Europe. The Lines were completed by May 1643 and the City and suburban TB companies took their turns in manning the forts and key points, including one company on duty at Westminster. The London Militia Committee took over control of the Westminster and Tower Hamlets Liberties TBs and amalgamated those from the Middlesex parishes within the Lines of Communication with the Westminster Auxiliaries, a second regiment raised in April 1643 to help cover the duties. Thus the Committee for Middlesex only had a single regiment commanded by Sir Gilbert Gerard, 1st Baronet of Harrow on the Hill, Member of Parliament (MP) for the county. Gerard was paymaster of the Parliamentarian army (Treasurer at War, 1642) and a member of the Council of War in 1643.

=== Campaigning 1643–44 ===
The Westminster Liberty Regiment, or 'Red Regiment', formed part of a London brigade commanded by their own colonel, Sir James Harington, that took part in Sir William Waller's campaign in the winter of 1643–44. They were engaged at the Siege of Basing House, after which some of the men deserted, only to be fined when they reached home. Despite cries of 'Home, Home' from the trained bandsmen, the brigade remained with Waller's army, and the Westminsters took part in the storming of Alton on 13 December. The brigade then refused further service and marched home on 20 December. It therefore missed the Battle of Cheriton on 29 March 1644.

After Cheriton a fresh London brigade had to be provided before Waller's army could take the field. Once again it was commanded by Maj-Gen Harington but this time it included the Westminster Yellow Auxiliaries. Essex and Waller manoeuvred the king out of Oxford and then Waller shadowed him through the Midlands until they clashed at the Battle of Cropredy Bridge on 29 June. Unable to complete the destruction of Waller's army, which was about to be reinforced, the king broke contact and pursued Essex's army into the West Country.

Waller's reinforcements were a further London brigade under Maj-Gen Richard Browne of the LTBs. Too late for Cropredy Bridge, and already losing individuals and whole units to desertion, Browne went to capture Greenland House on the River Thames near Henley, using the county TBs, including Gerard's Middlesex regiment. He was then left in command at Abingdon with what remained of his London regiments, including the Westminster Liberty Regiment. Meanwhile Harington's brigade (including the Westminster Yellow Auxiliaries) had taken up the chant of 'Home, Home!', and was finally allowed home in August.

When the Parliamentary leaders ordered a new concentration of forces to face the King's victorious army on its return from the west, London provided a fresh brigade under Harington including the Westminster Liberty Regiment, recently at Abingdon. On 26 October the combined Parliamentary forces confronted the Royalist army at the Second Battle of Newbury and attempted a converging attack, the Westminsters and other London regiments holding the Royalists in play. Nevertheless, the Parliamentarian combination misfired and the Royalists escaped the trap to reach Oxford. In November 300 men of the Middlesex TB were sent to Windsor to put down a mutiny in the garrison.

The failure of the existing Parliamentary armies in 1644 led to the formation of a single field army, known as the New Model Army, and the importance of the London and other TBs regiments waned. However, after the Battle of Naseby in 1645, the New Model Army advanced into the West Country, and the Middlesex TBs were ordered to a rendezvous at Romsey in June. They may have been involved in the final siege of Basing House, which surrendered in October.

=== Commonwealth and Protectorate ===
After the end of the First Civil War, disputes began to arise among the winners. In 1646 the Middlesex and Westminster TBs bid for independence from the London Militia Committee. By 1647 control of the English Trained Bands had become an issue between Parliament and the Army, as it had been between Parliament and the King. The Army regarded the TBs as its second line and tried to wrest control from the politicians, some of whom wanted to use them as a counterweight to the Army, which was refusing to disband until pay arrears were settled. However, when the Army reached Hounslow the London and suburban TBs refused to muster, the politicians caved in, and the New Model marched in. After the Army removed its opponents from Parliament ('Pride's Purge') the 'Rump Parliament' passed new Militia Acts that replaced lords lieutenant with county commissioners appointed by Parliament or the Council of State. An 'Ordinance to settle the Militia of Westminster and parts adjacent, within the County of Middlesex' was passed on 9 September 1647 (at this time the term 'Trained Band' began to disappear in most counties). The revived London Militia Committee demolished the Lines of Communication and returned the suburban TBs to local control.

Under the Commonwealth and Protectorate the militia received pay when called out, and operated alongside the New Model Army to control the country. During the Worcester campaign of the Third English Civil War in 1651, the Middlesex Militia was ordered to rendezvous at St Albans while the LTBs remained guarding London.

== Middlesex Militia ==
After the Restoration of the Monarchy, the English Militia was re-established by the Militia Act 1661 under the control of the king's lords lieutenant, the men to be selected by ballot. This was popularly seen as the 'Constitutional Force' to counterbalance a 'Standing Army' tainted by association with the New Model Army that had supported Cromwell's military dictatorship.

Under Charles II the Lord Lieutenant of Middlesex was always a professional soldier, first George Monck, 1st Duke of Albemarle, later the Earl of Craven (who was the son of a Lord Mayor of London). In times of national emergency when the king was absent from London (for example in 1682), Craven was made lieutenant-general of all the forces in London and Westminster.

Part of the Middlesex Militia was on duty in London during the Great Fire of 1666. The militia were also called out in the Second and Third Dutch Wars, and for repression of dissent. During the Popish Plot crisis in 1678, the militia were mobilised to guard London, Westminster, Southwark and the suburbs.

In 1697 the Middlesex Militia comprised:

- County Regiment of Middlesex, Colonel R. Shoreditch – 6 companies, 603 men
- Red Regiment of Westminster, Col Hon Philip Howard, former MP for Westminster – 10 companies, 1400 men
- Blewe Regiment of Middlesex, Col John Bond – 10 companies 1358 men
- County Troop of Horse, Capt Sir Charles Gerard, 3rd Baronet, former MP for Middlesex – 1 Troop, 85 horse
- Westminster Troop of Horse, Capt Anthony Rowe
  - 1 Trp – 46 horse
  - 2 Trp – 101 horse

Although most of the militia declined after the Treaty of Utrecht in 1713, the Middlesex and Westminster regiments continued to be mustered, in 1715, 1722 and as late as 1728. The Blue Regiment was described as from 'Middlesex within the Bills of mortality' (ie the suburban parishes included within the London health district).

== 1757 Reforms ==
Under threat of French invasion during the Seven Years' War a series of Militia Acts from 1757 re-established county militia regiments, the men being conscripted by means of parish ballots (paid substitutes were permitted) to serve for three years. There was a property qualification for officers, who were commissioned by the lord lieutenant. Middlesex was given a quota of 1600 men to raise, but failed to do so – possibly because the Lord Lieutenant of Middlesex, the Duke of Newcastle, was Leader of the Opposition, who had opposed the Militia Acts. A patriotic ballad of the time declared:

All over the land they'll find such a stand,
From our English Militia Men ready at hand,
Though in Sussex and Middlesex folks are but fiddlesticks,
While an old fiddlestick has the command

(the 'old fiddlestick' was Newcastle, who was also powerful in Sussex).

Newcastle held meetings in 1758 and 1759 but insufficient numbers of qualified persons put themselves forward for commissions in the Middlesex Militia, and he suspended the execution of the Act in the county in both years. However, opinion in the county shifted and the deputy lieutenants and MPs applied to Parliament to revoke the suspension, forcing Newcastle to act. Finally, in July 1760, the lieutenancy began forming the militiamen of Middlesex into regiments and appointing officers. There were again three regiments (Eastern, Western and Westminster) and arms and accoutrements were supplied from the Tower of London on 7 and 12 August when the county had secured 60 per cent of its quota of recruits. However, by then the war was going in Britain's favour and the threat of invasion had lifted: no further militia were required, and the Middlesex regiments were not actually embodied before the war ended in 1762. Parliament did however provide the money to continue training the militia in peacetime (two periods of 14 days or one period of 28 days each year).

=== War of American Independence ===
The militia was called out in 1778 after the outbreak of the War of American Independence, when the country was threatened with invasion by the Americans' allies, France and Spain. The three regiments of Middlesex Militia were 'embodied' for permanent duty for the first time on 31 March 1778:

- East Middlesex Militia at Hampstead
- West Middlesex Militia at Uxbridge
- Westminster Militia at Brentford (Note: Brentford was in south Middlesex, several miles west of Westminster; the regiment was never again based in Westminster itself.)

The Peace of Paris ended the war in 1783, but the militia had already been disembodied in 1782. From 1784 to 1792 they were assembled for their 28 days' annual peacetime training, but to save money only two-thirds of the men were actually mustered each year.

=== French Revolutionary and Napoleonic Wars ===
The militia was already being embodied when Revolutionary France declared war on Britain on 1 February 1793. The French Revolutionary Wars saw a new phase for the English militia: they were embodied for a whole generation, and became regiments of full-time professional soldiers (though restricted to service in the British Isles), which the regular army increasingly saw as a prime source of recruits. They served in coast defences, manning garrisons, guarding prisoners of war, and for internal security, while their traditional local defence duties were taken over by the Volunteers and mounted Yeomanry.

Middlesex remained one of the 'black spots' for militia recruitment: in August 1793 the Western Regiment was 90 men short of the number it should have embodied. In a fresh attempt to have as many men as possible under arms for home defence in order to release regulars, the Government created the Supplementary Militia, a compulsory levy of men to be trained in their spare time, to be incorporated in the Regular Militia in emergency and to keep up its numbers. Middlesex's 's quota was fixed at 5820 men. The suburban subdivisions of Westminster, Holborn and Finsbury provided 4987 of the quota. The number of militia regiments in the county was increased to five. But when the first training of the Middlesex Supplementary Militia was held, only 70 came put of 485 summoned. The Earl of Mansfield, colonel of the Eastern Regiment, complained in November 1798 that he had only received 120 of the supplementary men instead of over 700 he was due, and half of them were unfit. In 1799 the Westminster Regiment was 745 men short. One of the new regiments was the 4th Middlesex or South Middlesex Militia. The regiment was reduced in 1799.

In January 1796 the colonel of the Westminster Regiment, John Fenton-Cawthorne, MP, was court-martialled for withholding money he was due to have paid his men, and forcing them to pay for clothing (from his contractor) that they did not need. After a long and widely reported trial, the court found him guilty on seven charges and ordered him to be cashiered from the service. He was also expelled from Parliament.

In 1804 the three regiments of Middlesex Militia were awarded the prefix 'Royal', giving the following titles, which were held until 1852:

- 1st or Royal East Middlesex Militia
- 2nd or Royal West Middlesex Militia
- 3rd or Royal Westminster Militia

While the militia were the mainstay of national defence during the Revolutionary and Napoleonic Wars, local defence was entrusted to the part-time volunteer units, a large number of which were raised in London and its suburbs. However, the Volunteers were declining nationally by 1808 and a new Local Militia was instituted, also part-time but if its ranks could not be filled voluntarily the Militia Ballot was to be employed. Nevertheless, numbers of Volunteer units remained high in London and Middlesex, and the Local Militia Act was not enacted in the county.

Legislation passed in 1798 (the Militia (No. 4) Act 1798) and 1811 (the Interchange Act 1811) permitted English militia regiments to serve in Ireland for two years. The Royal West Middlesex and Royal Westminsters both served there, the Westminsters also serving in Jersey. From November 1813 the militia were invited to volunteer for limited overseas service, primarily for garrison duties in Europe. The West Middlesex provided a large detachment to a Provisional Battalion in a militia brigade that arrived at Bordeaux just as the war was ending.

The militia was disembodied at the end of the Napoleonic War but most of it had to be embodied again in June 1815 during the short Waterloo Campaign. Thereafter there was another long peace. Although militia officers continued to be commissioned and ballots were still held until suspended by the Militia Act 1829, the regiments were rarely assembled for training and the permanent staffs of sergeants and drummers (who were occasionally used to maintain public order) were progressively reduced.

== 1852 Reforms ==
The militia was revived by the Militia Act 1852, enacted during a period of international tension. As before, units were raised and administered on a county basis, and filled by voluntary enlistment (although conscription by means of the militia ballot might be used if the counties failed to meet their quotas). Training was for 56 days on enlistment, then for 21–28 days per year, during which the men received full army pay. Under the Act, militia units could be embodied by Royal Proclamation for full-time home defence service in three circumstances:

1. 'Whenever a state of war exists between Her Majesty and any foreign power'.
2. 'In all cases of invasion or upon imminent danger thereof'.
3. 'In all cases of rebellion or insurrection'.

The existing militia regiments were reorganised, with most of the old officers and permanent staff pensioned off and replaced, and annual training was resumed.

The Royal West Middlesex was designated a Light Infantry regiment in 1852. The following year the Middlesex Militia was expanded from three to five regiments. A new regiment was formed in South Middlesex, and the recruiting area of the Royal West Middlesex was effectively split, with a new 5th regiment taking over the north-western part of the county in Elthorne Hundred, one of the ancient subdivisions of the county, while the existing 2nd regiment took over Edmonton Hundred, the most northerly division of Middlesex. Between 1853 and 1881 Middlesex had the following militia regiments:

- 1st or Royal East Middlesex Militia at Hampstead
- 2nd Middlesex, or Edmonton Royal Rifle Regiment at Barnet
- 3rd Middlesex, or Royal Westminster Light Infantry at Turnham Green
- 4th or Royal South Middlesex Militia at Hounslow
- 5th Middlesex, or Royal Elthorne Light Infantry Militia at Uxbridge

=== Crimean War and after ===
War having broken out with Russia in 1854 and an expeditionary force sent to the Crimea, the militia began to be called out for home defence. All five Middlesex regiments served, and the Royal Westminster LI volunteered for garrison duty overseas, spending 1855–56 in Corfu, for which it was awarded the Battle Honour Mediterranean. Although the 4th and 5th Middlesex Militia were embodied in 1857 to relieve regular troops for service against the Indian Mutiny, the number of regiments required was smaller, and the other Middlesex regiments were not called upon.

Thereafter the militia regiments were called out for their annual training. The Militia Reserve introduced in 1867 consisted of present and former militiamen who undertook to serve overseas in case of war.

== Cardwell and Childers Reforms ==
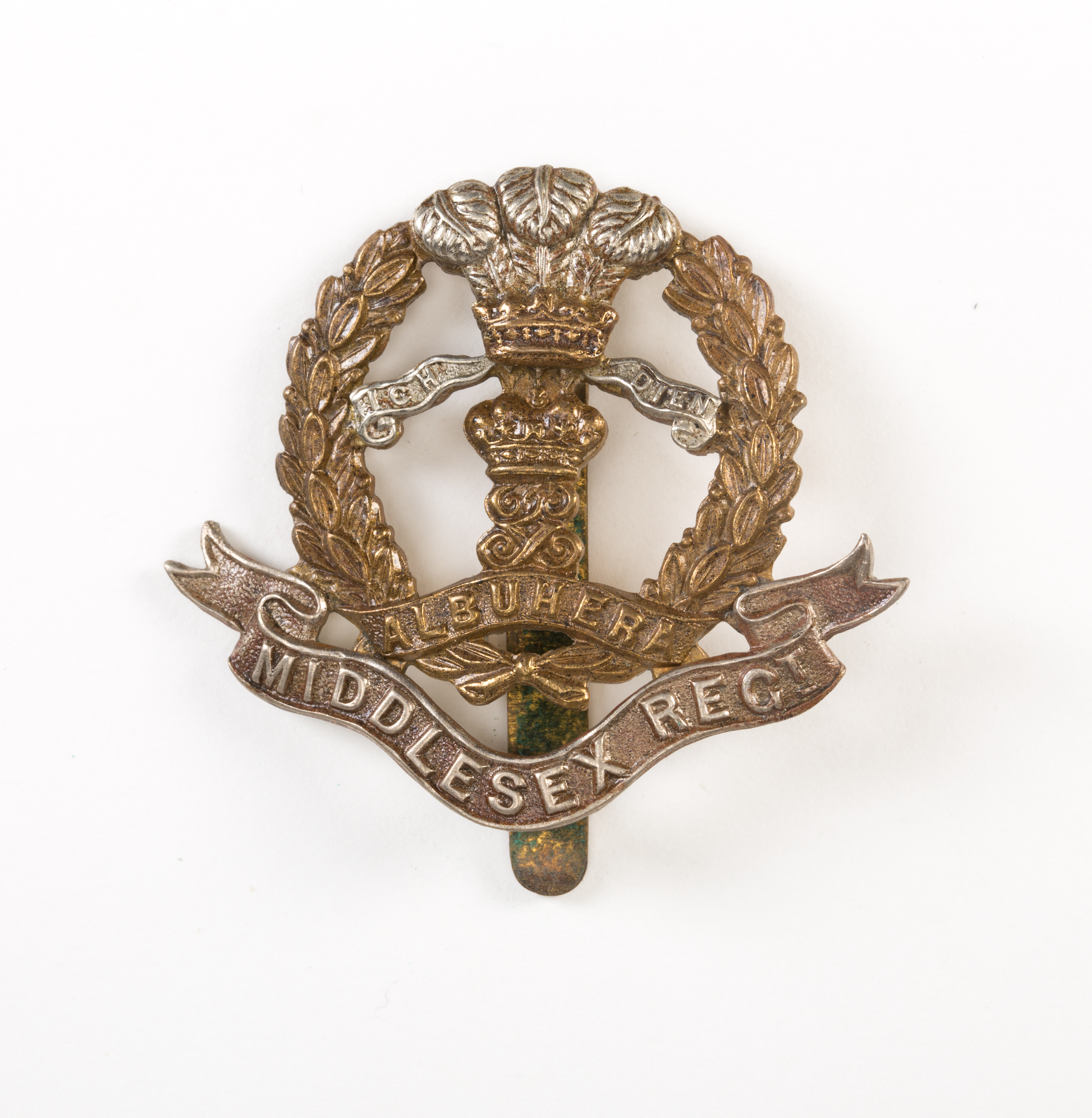
Cap badge of the Middlesex Regiment.

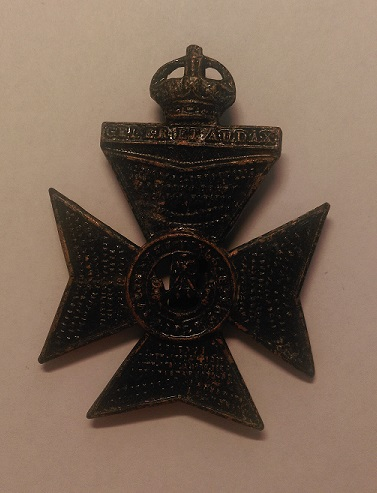
Cap badge of the King's Royal Rifle Corps.

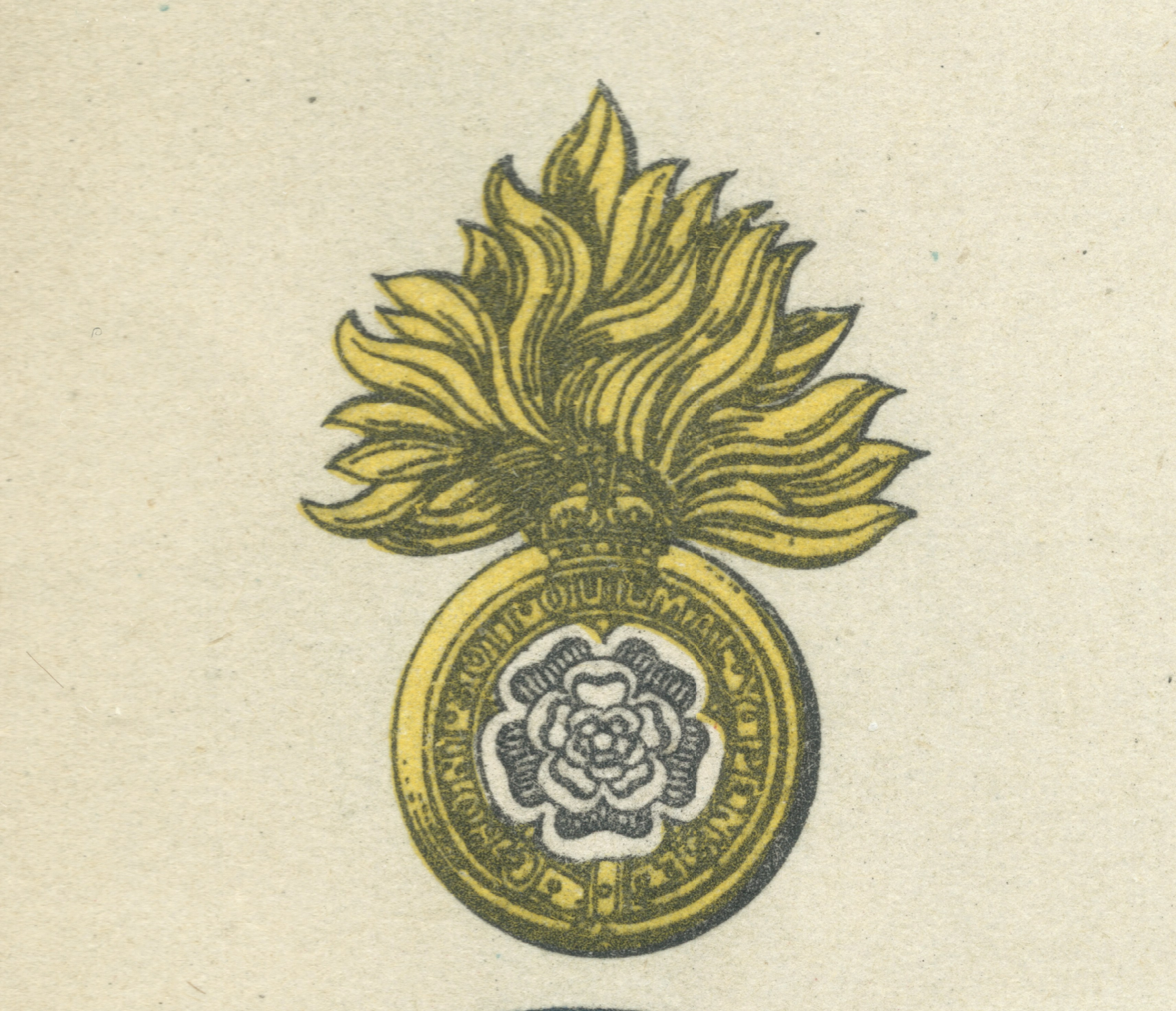
Cap badge of the Royal Fusiliers'.

Under the 'Localisation of the Forces' scheme introduced by the Cardwell Reforms of 1872, militia regiments were brigaded with their local regular and Volunteer battalions. Middlesex and the London conurbation hosted several of these. The Royal East Middlesex and Royal Elthorne LI were placed in Sub-District No 50 (Middlesex & Metropolitan), grouped with the 57th Foot and the 77th Foot, the Edmonton Rifles were in Sub-District No 51 & 52 (60th Rifles), grouped with the four Regular battalions of the 60th Rifles and the Royal London Militia, while the Royal Westminster LI and Royal South Middlesex were with the 7th Foot (the Royal Fusiliers) in Sub-District No 49 (Middlesex & Metropolitan). The militia now came under the War Office rather than their county lords lieutenant, and battalions had a large cadre of permanent staff (about 30). Around a third of the recruits and many young officers went on to join the Regular Army.

Following the Cardwell Reforms a mobilisation scheme began to appear in the Army List from December 1875. This assigned regular and militia units to places in an order of battle of corps, divisions and brigades for the 'Active Army', even though these formations were entirely theoretical, with no staff or services assigned. The 1st Royal East, 2nd Edmonton Rifles and 3rd Westminster LI constituted 2nd Brigade of 3rd Division in III Corps, while the 4th Royal South Middlesex was assigned to 1st Brigade in the same division, which would have mustered in Kent in time of war. The 5th Elthorne LI station was with the Garrison Army in the Thames and Medway defences.

The Childers Reforms took Cardwell's reforms further, with the linked battalions forming single regiments from 1 July 1881, the 57th and 77th Regiments becoming the Duke of Cambridge's Own (Middlesex Regiment). The militia battalions were now numbered in sequence after the regulars:

- 4th (Royal East Middlesex Militia) Battalion, Middlesex Regiment
- 7th (Royal 2nd Middlesex Militia) Battalion, King's Royal Rifle Corps (KRRC)
- 3rd (Royal Westminster Militia) Battalion, Royal Fusiliers (City of London Regiment)
- 5th (Royal South Middlesex Militia) Battalion, Royal Fusiliers (City of London Regiment)
- 3rd (Royal Elthorne Militia) Battalion, Middlesex Regiment

During the late 1890s several regiments recruiting from large conurbations, including the Royal Fusiliers and the Middlesex Regiment, were increased from two to four battalions (the KRRC already had four). The militia battalions were renumbered accordingly, the 3rd and 5th Royal Fusiliers becoming the 5th and 7th in 1898, and the 3rd and 4th Middlesex becoming 5th and 6th in 1900.

=== Second Boer War ===
After the disasters of Black Week at the start of the Second Boer War in December 1899, most of the Regular Army was sent to South Africa, and all five Middlesex battalions were called out. The 6th (Royal East Middlesex) Middlesex volunteered for overseas service and saw action in South Africa in 1900–02. The rest of the battalions were disembodied in 1900, but the 5th (Royal Westminster) Royal Fusiliers and 5th (Royal Elthorne) Middlesex were embodied again later and then went on active service in South Africa.

== Special Reserve ==
After the Boer War, there were moves to reform the Auxiliary Forces (militia, yeomanry and volunteers) to take their place in the six army corps proposed by St John Brodrick as Secretary of State for War. However, little of Brodrick's scheme was carried out. Under the sweeping Haldane Reforms of 1908, the militia was replaced by the Special Reserve, a semi-professional force similar to the previous militia reserve, whose role was to provide reinforcement drafts for regular units serving overseas in wartime. The five Middlesex battalions all transferred to the SR and were redesignated (in order of precedence):

- 5th (Reserve) Battalion, Royal Fusiliers
- 6th (Reserve) Battalion, Royal Fusiliers
- 5th (Reserve) Battalion, Middlesex Regiment
- 6th (Extra Reserve) Battalion, Middlesex Regiment
- 6th (Extra Reserve) Battalion, King's Royal Rifle Corps

=== World War I ===
The SR was mobilised on the outbreak of World War I and proceeded to its war stations. The Royal Fusiliers were at Dover, the Middlesex and KRRC in the Thames & Medway Garrison; the 6th Royal Fusiliers spent the last year of the war in Ireland. In addition to their defensive duties, the SR's role was to equip the Reservists and Special Reservists of their regiments and send them as reinforcement drafts to the Regular battalions serving overseas, and afterwards to train new recruits. In October 1914 each SR battalion was ordered to use their surplus recruits to form a service battalion of their regiment for Kitchener's 4th New Army ('K4'). In this way the 14th and 15th Royal Fusiliers, 14th and 15th Middlesex, and 15th KRRC were formed by the former Middlesex Militia battalions. In April 1915 these K4 service battalions were converted into reserve battalions to carry out the same role for the 1st–3rd New Army (K1–K3) battalions that the SR battalions were doing to the Regulars. In 1916 these K4 reserve battalions were transferred from their regiments to the Training Reserve.

The SR resumed its old title of Militia in 1921 but remained in abeyance after World War I. The Militia was formally disbanded in April 1953.

== Heritage and ceremonial ==
=== Uniforms and insignia ===
The coat of arms of Middlesex.

The Trained Bands were apparently not issued with uniforms, their regimental names being derived from the colours of their company flags or 'ensigns' – the Westminster Red Regiment, the Westminster Yellow Auxiliaries, the Blewe Regiment etc. The Militia Regiment of Foot of the County of Middlesex was noted in July 1712 as having new red coats with grey facings, and a hat edged with gold colour; the regiment was now equipped throughout with muskets and bayonets in place of the proportion of pikes. In 1722–28 the Westminster Troop of Horse Militia wore buff coats and was mounted on black or brown horses.

When the Blewe Regiment was reformed as the Eastern Regiment in 1760 its regimental colour was white, carrying the Duke of Newcastle's coat of arms, and the facings of the red uniforms were also white. However, when they were embodied in 1778 all the regiments of the Middlesex Militia had blue facings (usually associated with 'Royal' regiments), long before the 'Royal' title was conferred in 1804.

The Coat of arms of Middlesex had three Saxon Seaxes in pale, surmounted by a Saxon crown rather than the normal royal crown. Several of the regiments adapted this into their insignia.

In 1881 the battalions adopted the uniform, facings and insignia of their associated regiments.

=== Precedence ===
During the War of American Independence the counties were given an order of precedence determined by ballot each year. For the Middlesex Militia the positions were:

- 6th on 1 June 1778
- 28th on 12 May 1779
- 7th on 6 May 1780
- 30th on 28 April 1781
- 14th on 7 May 1782

The order balloted for at the start of the French Revolutionary War in 1793 remained in force throughout the war. Middlesex's precedence of 22nd applied to all three regiments. Another ballot for precedence took place at the start of the Napoleonic War: Middlesex was 20th.

The militia order of precedence for the Napoleonic War remained in force until 1833. In that year the King drew the lots for individual regiments and the resulting list remained in force with minor amendments until the end of the militia. The regiments raised before the peace of 1763 took the first 47 places but the three Middlesex regiments raised in 1760 were included in the second group (1763–83), presumably because they were not actually embodied until 1778:

- 1st Royal East Middlesex Militia ranked 65th
- 2nd Royal West Middlesex Militia ranked 58th
- 3rd Royal Westminster Militia ranked 55th

The regimental number was only a subsidiary title and most regiments paid little attention to it, but when new regiments were raised in 1855 some of them were given numbers that had become vacant: the 5th Middlesex received 28th (replacing the Pembroke Militia, which had been converted to Militia Artillery). It therefore outranked the Royal East Middlesex, leading to their relative precedence as 3rd and 4th (later 5th and 6th) battalions of the Middlesex Regiment. The 2nd Royal West Middlesex seems to have been treated as a new unit after its split to form the 4th and found its number changed to 63rd (replacing the Isle of Wight Militia, converted to Militia Artillery).

- 1st Royal East Middlesex ranked 65th
- 2nd Edmonton Royal Rifles ranked 63rd
- 3rd Royal Westminster Light Infantry ranked 55th
- 4th Royal South Middlesex ranked 128th
- 5th Royal Elthorne Light Infantry ranked 28th

== See also ==
- Trained Bands
- Militia (English)
- Militia (Great Britain)
- Militia (United Kingdom)
- Special Reserve
- Westminster Trained Bands
- Royal East Middlesex Militia
- Royal West Middlesex Militia
- Royal Westminster Militia
- Royal South Middlesex Militia
- Royal Elthorne Light Infantry Militia
- Royal Fusiliers
- Middlesex Regiment
- King's Royal Rifle Corps
