= Royal Westminster Militia =

Auxiliary unit of the British Army

Red Regiment of Westminster Militia 3rd or Royal Westminster Middlesex Militia 5th (Reserve) Battalion, Royal Fusiliers
- Active: 1662–1 April 1953
- Country: England 1662–1707; Kingdom of Great Britain (1707–1800); United Kingdom (1801–1953)
- Branch: Militia/Special Reserve
- Type: Infantry
- Part of: Royal Fusiliers (City of London Regiment)
- Garrison/HQ: Westminster; Brentford; Turnham Green; Hounslow
- Engagements: Second Boer War

Commanders
- Notable commanders: Col John Fenton-Cawthorne; Henry Cadogan, 4th Earl Cadogan

The Royal Westminster Militia, later the 5th (Reserve) Battalion, Royal Fusiliers, was an auxiliary (Note: It is incorrect to describe the British Militia as 'irregular': throughout their history they were equipped and trained exactly like the line regiments of the regular army, and once embodied in time of war they were fulltime professional soldiers for the duration of their enlistment.) regiment raised in the City of Westminster in the suburbs of London. Descended from the Westminster Trained Bands, which were on duty during the Armada campaign of 1588 and saw considerable service during the English Civil War, the regiment underwent reorganisation in 1760 as part of the Middlesex Militia. From 1778 until 1918 the regiment served in home and colonial defence in all of Britain's major wars, and supplied thousands of reinforcements to the Royal Fusiliers during World War I. After a shadowy postwar existence the unit was finally disbanded in 1953.

== Background ==
The universal obligation to military service in the Shire levy was long established in England and its legal basis was updated by two acts of 1557 (4 & 5 Ph. & M. cc. 2 and 3), which placed the militia under the command of county Lords Lieutenant appointed by the monarch. This is seen as the starting date for the organised county militia in England. Although the militia obligation was universal, it was clearly impractical to train and equip every able-bodied man, so after 1572 the practice was to select only a proportion of men for the, who were mustered for regular drills.

== Trained Bands ==
Although the City of Westminster was in the county of Middlesex, its Trained Bands were listed among the 'Out-Liberties' of London. During the Armada crisis of 1588, Westminster and the other suburban parishes such as St Giles-in-the-Fields and St Martin-in-the-Fields mustered a company consisting of 150 pikemen and 300 calivermen.

During the English Civil War Westminster and the suburban parishes of Middlesex were included within the defences dug round London, and from 1643 their Trained Bands came under the London Militia Committee rather than the Lord Lieutenant of Middlesex. The Westminster Liberty Regiment (also known as the 'Westminster Red Regiment') operated alongside the London Trained Bands (LTBs), and like the City of London regiments raised an Auxiliary regiment to share the duties. The two Westminster regiments saw action during the cvil war at the Siege of Basing House and the battles of Alton, Cropredy Bidge and Second Newbury.

== Restoration Militia ==
After the Restoration of the Monarchy, the English Militia was re-established by the Militia Act 1661 under the control of the king's lords-lieutenant, the men to be selected by ballot. This was popularly seen as the 'Constitutional Force' to counterbalance a 'Standing Army' tainted by association with the New Model Army that had supported Cromwell's military dictatorship, and almost the whole burden of home defence and internal security was entrusted to the militia.

Under Charles II the Lord Lieutenant of Middlesex was always a professional soldier, first George Monck, 1st Duke of Albemarle, later the 1st Earl of Craven (who was the son of a Lord Mayor of London). In times of national emergency when the king was absent from London (for example in 1682), Craven was made lieutenant-general of all the forces in London and Westminster. During the Popish Plot crisis in 1678, the militia were mobilised to guard London, Westminster, Southwark and the suburbs.

Middlesex had three regiments including the Red Regiment of Westminster. In 1697 it was commanded by Colonel the Hon Philip Howard, former MP for Westminster, and consisted of 1400 men in 10 companies together with the Westminster Troop of Horse Militia under Captain Anthony Rowe (actually two Troops, with 46 an 101 men respectively). Although most of the militia declined after the Peace of Utrecht in 1713, the London Trained Bands remained fully active, and the Westminster units continued to appear at least as late as 1728 (the colonel in 1722 was Robert Gardiner).

== 1757 reforms ==
Under threat of French invasion during the Seven Years' War a series of Militia Acts from 1757 re-established county militia regiments, the men being conscripted by means of parish ballots (paid substitutes were permitted) to serve for three years. There was a property qualification for officers, who were commissioned by the lord lieutenant. An adjutant and drill sergeants were to be provided to each regiment from the Regular Army, and arms and accoutrements would be supplied when the county had secured 60 per cent of its quota of recruits. Middlesex was given a quota of 1600 men to raise, but failed to do so – possibly because the Lord Lieutenant of Middlesex, the Duke of Newcastle, was Leader of the Opposition, who had opposed the Militia Acts. A patriotic ballad of the time declared:

All over the land they'll find such a stand,
From our English Militia Men ready at hand,
Though in Sussex and Middlesex folks are but fiddlesticks,
While an old fiddlestick has the command

(the 'old fiddlestick' was Newcastle, who was also powerful in Sussex).

Claiming insufficient numbers of qualified officers, Newcastle suspended the execution of the Act in Middlesex for two years. However, opinion in the county shifted and in July 1760, the lieutenancy began forming three regiments (Eastern, Western and Westminster) and the arms and accoutrements were supplied from the Tower of London on 7 and 12 August However, by then the war was going in Britain's favour and the threat of invasion had lifted: no further militia were required, and the Middlesex regiments were not actually embodied before the war ended in 1762. Parliament did however provide the money to continue training the militia in peacetime (two periods of 14 days or one period of 28 days each year). (Note: Two sources give 1797 as the date for the formation of the 3rd Middlesex or Westminster Militia: described as 'completed for service' and 'raised at Brentford' in that year, These are followed by secondary sources, but seem to be an error for the first embodiment of the regiment in 1778.)

=== War of American Independence ===
The militia were called out in 1778 after the outbreak of the War of American Independence, when the country was threatened with invasion by the Americans' allies, France and Spain. The three regiments of Middlesex Militia were embodied for the first time on 31 March 1778, the Westminsters mustered at Brentford. (Note: Brentford was in south Middlesex, several miles west of Westminster; the regiment was never again based in Westminster itself.) On mobilisation the inspecting general reported that the officers of the Westminsters were few and poor. In 1779 they were described as 'mostly old and apparently ignorant: during parade they fell to the rear and left it to the sergeants to give orders'.

The Peace of Paris ended the war in 1783, but the militia had already been disembodied in 1782. From 1784 to 1792 the militia were assembled for their 28 days' annual peacetime training, but to save money only two-thirds of the men were actually mustered each year. By 1788, Thomas Sockwell had 30 years' service with the Westminster Regiment and had risen to the rank of major. He was now the commanding officer, because both the colonel and lieutenant-colonel had died. At their 1791 muster the Westminsters were described as 'the refuse of London' and 'little books' of seditious literature were circulating among them, while the officers were little better than the men.

=== French Revolutionary and Napoleonic Wars ===
The militia was already being embodied when Revolutionary France declared war on Britain on 1 February 1793. The French Revolutionary Wars saw a new phase for the English militia: they were embodied for a whole generation, and became regiments of full-time professional soldiers (though restricted to service in the British Isles), which the regular army increasingly saw as a prime source of recruits. They served in coast defences, manning garrisons, guarding prisoners of war, and for internal security, while their traditional local defence duties were taken over by the Volunteers and mounted Yeomanry.

The Westminster Regiment was 'ordered into actual service' (embodied) in 1793. The colonel, John Fenton-Cawthorne, Member of Parliament, was later accused of withholding the 'Marching Guineas' he had received from the paymaster to the forces – the sum of 21 shillings to be paid through the company commanders to every militiaman on embodiment for his clothing and kit other than the basic uniform. The men complained to higher authority, and when the regiment was part of the force camped at Brighton in October, the camp commander, Maj-Gen Francis Lascelles, was ordered to investigate. Cawthorne was ordered to pay the money he had received, but did nothing. He was also accused of taking money (usually £10) from balloted men in order to find substitutes, but paying a smaller bounty to the men he actually enlisted (some of whom had already deserted from the regiment before) and pocketing the difference. At the following summer's camp, at Lydd in 1794, he forced men to pay for replacement clothing they did not need. The men complained again in September, and by November Gen Sir William Howe and Lt-Gen Lascelles again ordered Cawthorne to pay the Marching Guineas, without effect. While in camp near Hythe in the summer of 1795 he was found to be submitting 'false musters' (including on the roll the names of men who were not in the regiment, in order to pocket their pay). He was also found to have submitted the names of under-age boys to the county lieutenancy for commissions as ensigns; the boys were too young to do duty, and again Cawthorne was accused of pocketing the pay and allowances. He was brought before a Court-martial at Horse Guards in January 1796. The court consisted of 15 senior militia officers under the presidency of the Earl of Powis, colonel of the Montgomeryshire Militia. After a long and widely reported trial, the court found him guilty on seven of the 14 charges laid against him, and ordered him to be cashiered from the service. He was also expelled from Parliament as a result of the scandal (though he returned some years later). Fenton-Cawthorne was replaced as colonel of the regiment by James Clitherow, appointed on 25 July 1796.

Middlesex was one of the 'black spots' for militia recruitment. In a fresh attempt to have as many men as possible under arms for home defence in order to release regulars, the Government created the Supplementary Militia, a compulsory levy of men to be trained in their spare time, to be incorporated in the Militia in emergency and to keep up the numbers. Middlesex's 's quota was fixed at 5820 men, the suburban subdivisions of Westminster, Holborn and Finsbury providing 4987. But in 1799 the Westminster Regiment was 745 men short of it establishment.

The war ended with the Treaty of Amiens in March 1802 and all the militia were stood down. However, the Peace of Amiens was short-lived and the regiments, whose training commitment had been increased from 21 to 28 days a year, were called out again in 1803. In 1804 the Middlesex Militia were awarded the prefix 'Royal', the regiment becoming the Royal Westminster, or 3rd Middlesex Militia on 23 April.

During the summer of 1805, when Napoleon was massing his 'Army of England' at Boulogne for a projected invasion, the Westminsters, with 883 men in 10 companies under Lt-Col William Allen, were stationed at Norman Cross Barracks as part of a brigade under Brigadier-General Nicholas Nepean.

The Militia (No. 4) Act 1798and Interchange Act 1811 allowed English militia regiments to serve in Ireland for two years, During the French wars, the Westminster Militia served in England, Ireland, Scotland and Jersey.

=== Long peace ===
The militia was disembodied at the end of the Napoleonic War but most of it had to be embodied again in June 1815 during the short Waterloo Campaign. Thereafter there was another long peace. Although officers continued to be commissioned into the militia and ballots were still held until they were suspended by the Militia Act 1829, the regiments were rarely assembled for training and the permanent staffs of sergeants and drummers (who were occasionally used to maintain public order) were progressively reduced. In 1840 the Royal Westminsters were still commanded by Col Clitherow, with Regimental Headquarters (HQ) at Brentford. Viscount Chelsea took over the colonelcy on 6 December 1841.

== 1852 reforms ==
The Militia was revived by the Militia Act 1852, enacted during a period of international tension. As before, units were raised and administered on a county basis, and filled by voluntary enlistment (although conscription by means of the militia ballot might be used if the counties failed to meet their quotas). Training was for 56 days on enlistment, then for 21–28 days per year, during which the men received full army pay. Under the Act, militia units could be embodied by Royal Proclamation for full-time home defence service in three circumstances:

1. 'Whenever a state of war exists between Her Majesty and any foreign power'.
2. 'In all cases of invasion or upon imminent danger thereof'.
3. 'In all cases of rebellion or insurrection'.

The existing militia regiments were reorganised, with most of the old officers and permanent staff pensioned off and replaced, and annual training was resumed.

By now Regimental HQ was at Hammersmith, moving to Turnham Green from 1855.

In 1853 the Middlesex Militia were reorganised from three into five regiments, and the Westminsters were designated the 3rd or Royal Westminster Middlesex (Light Infantry) Militia.

=== Crimean War ===
War having broken out with Russia in 1854 and an expeditionary force sent to the Crimea, the militia began to be called out for home defence. The Royal Westminsters were embodied on 6 February 1855 and the regiment was initially stationed at Turnham Green, moving to Plymouth by beginning of July It then volunteered for garrison duty overseas and was sent to Corfu by October. There it was stationed at the Citadel, and later on the island of Vido. The regiment embarked for home in June 1856 and was disembodied on 18 July 1856. For this service it was awarded the Battle Honour Mediterranean.

Thereafter the militia regiments were called out for their annual training. The Militia Reserve introduced in 1867 consisted of present and former militiamen who undertook to serve overseas in case of war.

Viscount Chelsea succeeded his father as the 4th Earl Cadogan in 1864, and the following year became the regiment's Honorary Colonel, but by now his eldest son George Cadogan, Viscount Chelsea was one of the majors.

In September 1871 the British Army held Autumn Manoeuvres for the first time. 3rd Division was made up of militia regiments, the Royal Westminsters under the command of Lt-Col Terry serving in 3rd Brigade along with the 3rd Royal Surrey Militia and the 1st Tower Hamlets Militia (the 1st and 2nd Middlesex were in 1st Brigade, the 5th in 2nd Brigade). The regiments camped in the Aldershot area and were exercised round Frensham and Chobham Commons.

== Cardwell reforms ==
Under the 'Localisation of the Forces' scheme introduced by the Cardwell Reforms of 1872, Militia regiments were brigaded with their local regular and Volunteer battalions – for the Royal Westminsters this was with the 7th Foot (the Royal Fusiliers) in Sub-District No 49 (Middlesex & Metropolitan), along with the 4th Middlesex Militia and the 9th (Marylebone and West Middlesex), 40th (Central London Rifle Rangers) and 46th Middlesex Rifle Volunteers. The Militia now came under the War Office rather than their county lords lieutenant.

Although often referred to as brigades, the sub-districts were purely administrative organisations, but in a continuation of the Cardwell Reforms a mobilisation scheme began to appear in the Army List from December 1875. This assigned Regular and Militia units to places in an order of battle of corps, divisions and brigades for the 'Active Army', even though these formations were entirely theoretical, with no staff or services assigned. The Royal Westminsters together with the 1st Royal East and 2nd Middlesex Militia constituted the 2nd Brigade of 3rd Division in III Corps. The brigade would have mustered at Maidstone in time of war. Between 1877 and 1880 the Royal Westminsters moved their HQ from Turnham Green to the brigade depot at Hounslow, joining the other Regular and Militia battalions.

=== Royal Fusiliers ===
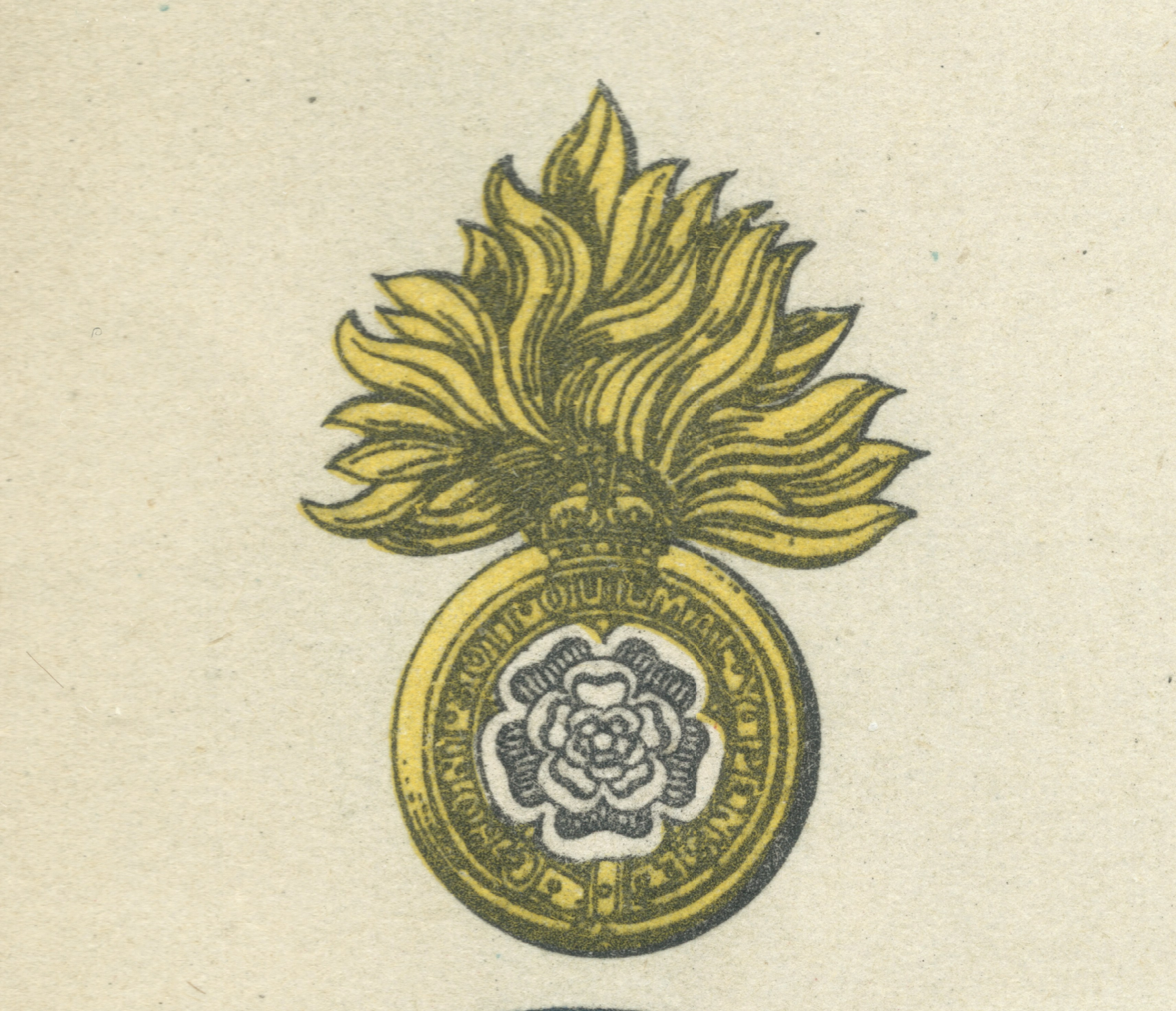
Royal Fusiliers' cap badge.

The Childers Reforms of 1881 took Cardwell's reforms further, with the militia formally joining their linked regiments and the regiment became the 3rd (Royal Westminster Militia) Battalion of the Royal Fusiliers on 1 July 1881 (the Royal London Militia became the 4th Bn and the 4th Middlesex Militia became the 5th Bn). At the same time the Royal Fusiliers took the subtitle 'City of London Regiment' Militia battalions now had a large cadre of permanent staff (about 30). Around a third of the recruits and many young officers went on to join the Regular Army.

The 3rd Bn Royal Fusiliers was embodied from 9 March to 30 September 1885 during the Panjdeh Crisis.

During the late 1890s several regiments recruiting from large conurbations, including the Royal Fusiliers in London and its suburbs, were increased from two to four regular battalions. The regiment was ordered to raise two additional battalions (numbered 3rd and 4th) in April 1898, and as a result the militia battalions were renumbered, the Royal Westminsters becoming 5th (Royal Westminster Militia) Battalion.

=== Second Boer War ===
After the disasters of Black Week at the start of the Second Boer War in December 1899, most of the Regular Army was sent to South Africa, and many militia units were embodied to replace them for home defence and to garrison certain overseas stations. The 5th Royal Fusiliers was embodied from 18 December 1899 to16 October 1900. It was embodied again on 6 May 1901 and volunteered for overseas service.

The battalion arrived in South Africa on 27 June under the command of Col H.B. Weatherall with a strength of 24 officers, one warrant officer and 594 other ranks. It was quartered near Kroonstad in the Orange Free State with detachments manning the blockhouses for about 8 miles (13 km) of the railway running north from the town, and some of the local defences. On 21 August the battalion was moved about 30 miles (48 km) south to Ventersburg Road Station where it took over all blockhouses from Bloomspruit Bridge to a mile south of Ventersburg.On 7 January 1902 a detachment went to do duty at Eengevonden, and on 16 February a larger detachment occupied the blockhouses near the Vet River Station. The war was ended by the Treaty of Vereeniging on 31 May, and on 19 June Battalion HQ entrained for Cape Town, picking up the Eengevonden and Vet River Station detachments on the way. At Cape Town it was quartered at Green Point until it embarked for home on 4 July.

The battalion was disembodied on 26 July 1902. During this service it lost two officers and 24 other ranks killed in action or died of disease. It was awarded the Battle Honour South Africa 1901–02 and the participants received the Queen's South Africa Medal with clasps for 'Cape Colony', 'Orange Free State', 'Transvaal', 'South Africa 1901' and '1902'.

== Special Reserve ==
After the Boer War, the future of the Militia was called into question. There were moves to reform the Auxiliary Forces (Militia, Yeomanry and Volunteers) to take their place in the six Army Corps proposed by the Secretary of State for War, St John Brodrick. However, little of Brodrick's scheme was carried out.

Under the more sweeping Haldane Reforms of 1908, the Militia was replaced by the Special Reserve (SR), a semi-professional force whose role was to provide reinforcement drafts for Regular units serving overseas in wartime, rather like the earlier Militia Reserve. The battalion became the 5th (Reserve) Battalion, Royal Fusiliers, on 9 August 1908.

== World War I ==
=== 5th (Reserve) Battalion ===
On the outbreak of World War I the 5th Royal Fusiliers mobilised on 4 August 1914 at Hounslow under Lt-Col Vivian Henry, a retired regular major, who had commanded the battalion since 4 May 1908. Within a few days it proceeded (with the 6th (Reserve) Bn) to its war station at Dover, where it remained for the whole war in the Dover Garrison. As well as its defensive duties, its role was to equip the Reservists and Special Reservists of the Royal Fusiliers and send them as reinforcement drafts to the Regular battalions serving on the Western Front. The 5th and 6th Bns assisted in the formation of 14th and 15th (Reserve) Bns (see below). The reserve battalions at times were each over 4000 strong. By June 1915, the 5th Bn alone had sent 80 officers and about 3000 men to the front.

After the Armistice with Germany the 5th Bn remained in existence until half its remaining personnel were drafted to 3rd Bn on 27 October 1919. The battalion was then disembodied on 15 November 1919, when the remaining half were drafted to 1st Bn.

=== 14th (Reserve) Battalion ===
After Lord Kitchener issued his call for volunteers in August 1914, the battalions of the 1st, 2nd and 3rd New Armies ('K1', 'K2' and 'K3' of 'Kitchener's Army') were quickly formed at the regimental depots. The SR battalions also swelled with new recruits and were soon well above their establishment strength. On 8 October 1914 each SR battalion was ordered to use the surplus to form a service battalion of the 4th New Army ('K4'). Accordingly, the 5th (Reserve) Bn at Dover formed the 14th (Service) Battalion of the Royal Fusiliers on 31 October 1914. It trained for active service as part of 95th Brigade in 32nd Division. On 10 April 1915 the War Office decided to convert the K4 battalions into 2nd Reserve units, to provide drafts for the K1–K3 battalions in the same way that the SR was doing for the Regular battalions. The Royal Fusiliers battalion became 14th (Reserve) Battalion in 7th Reserve Brigade and moved with it to Purfleet in Essex in May 1915. It moved with the brigade to Shoreham-by-Sea in September 1915 and returned to Dover in March 1916. On 1 September 1916 the 2nd Reserve battalions were transferred to the Training Reserve (TR) and it was redesignated 31st Training Reserve Bn, still in 7th Reserve Bde at Dover. The training staff retained their Royal Fusiliers badges. It was disbanded on 14 December 1917 at Clipstone Camp.

=== Postwar ===
The SR resumed its old title of Militia in 1921 but like most militia battalions the 5th Royal Fusiliers remained in abeyance after World War I. By the outbreak of World War II in 1939, no officers remained listed for the battalion. The Militia was formally disbanded in April 1953.

== Heritage and ceremonial ==
=== Uniforms and insignia ===
Until at least 1722 the Westminster Militia was known as the Red Regiment – as the Westminster Trained Bands had been – from the colour of its company flags. In 1722–28 the Westminster Troop of Horse Militia wore buff coats and was mounted on black or brown horses. When they were embodied in 1778 all the regiments of the Middlesex Militia had blue facings (usually associated with 'Royal' regiments), long before the 'Royal' title was conferred in 1804.

The regimental badge was a shield displaying the Portcullis from the coat of arms of the City of Westminster and the three Saxon Seaxes of Middlesex; after it became Light Infantry in 1853 the shield was surmounted by a bugle-horn. The officers' oval shoulder-belt plate of about 1800–03 carried an eight-pointed star, in the centre of which was a Saxon crown above two shields, carrying the arms of Westminster and Middlesex respectively, and the early buttons had this design of crown and shields, with the letters 'R.W.M." between the shields. From 1855 to 1881 the officers' waist-belt plate carried the combined shield surmounted by the bugle horn, within a circle inscribed '3rd or Royal Westminster Militia'.

Once the regiment became part of the Royal Fusiliers it adopted that regiment's cap badge and other insignia.

=== Precedence ===
During the War of American Independence the counties were given an order of precedence determined by ballot each year. For the Middlesex Militia the positions were:

- 6th on 1 June 1778
- 28th on 12 May 1779
- 7th on 6 May 1780
- 30th on 28 April 1781
- 14th on 7 May 1782

The order balloted for at the start of the French Revolutionary War in 1793 remained in force throughout the war. Middlesex's precedence of 22nd applied to all three regiments. Another ballot for precedence took place at the start of the Napoleonic War: Middlesex was 20th.

The militia order of precedence for the Napoleonic War remained in force until 1833. In that year the King drew the lots for individual regiments and the resulting list remained in force with minor amendments until the end of the militia. The regiments raised before the peace of 1763 took the first 47 places but the three Middlesex regiments raised in 1760 were included in the second group (1763–83), presumably because they were not actually embodied until 1778. The Royal Westminster Militia became 55th. The regimental number was only a subsidiary title and most regiments paid little attention to it.

=== Colonels ===
The following served as Colonel of the Regiment or as its Honorary Colonel:

Colonels

- Hon Philip Howard 1697
- Robert Gardiner, 1722
- John Fenton-Cawthorne, cashiered 1796
- James Clitherow, appointed 25 July 1796, died 1841
- Henry Cadogan, 4th Earl Cadogan appointed 6 December 1841

Honorary Colonels

- Henry Cadogan, 4th Earl Cadogan (who as Viscount Chelsea had been the regiment's CO) appointed 13 March 1865
- Col J.J. Glossop (Lt-Col Commandant from 10 August 18541854) appointed 23 July 1873
- George Cadogan, 5th Earl Cadogan, KG, (who as Viscount Chelsea had been a major in the regiment) appointed 24 February 1886
- Reginald Brett, 2nd Viscount Esher, GCB, GCVO, appointed 18 August 1908

=== Memorial ===
The 5th (Reserve) Battalion is included in the inscription on the Royal Fusiliers War Memorial in High Holborn, London.

=== Battle honours ===
The regiment was awarded the following Battle Honours:

- Mediterranean
- South Africa 1900–02

Under Army Order 251 of 1910, the Special Reserve were to bear the same battle honours as their parent regiments, so the Mediterranean honour, which was peculiar to militia units, was extinguished.

== See also ==
- Westminster Trained Bands
- Middlesex Militia
- Royal East Middlesex Militia
- Royal West Middlesex Militia
- Royal South Middlesex Militia
- Royal Elthorne Light Infantry Militia
- Royal Fusiliers
- Militia (United Kingdom)
- Special Reserve
