= Royal Elthorne Light Infantry Militia =

Auxiliary unit of the British Army

5th, or Royal Elthorne, Middlesex Light Infantry Militia 5th (Reserve) Battalion Middlesex Regiment
- Active: 16 May 1853–1 April 1953
- Country: United Kingdom
- Branch: Militia/Special Reserve
- Role: Infantry
- Size: 1 Battalion
- Garrison/HQ: Uxbridge; Hounslow Barracks; Mill Hill Barracks
- Engagements: Second Boer War

The 5th Middlesex Militia (Note: Not to be confused with Bullards' Regiment of Militia also known as the 5th Middlesex County Militia Regiment of Massachusetts) or Royal Elthorne Light Infantry was an auxiliary (Note: It is incorrect to describe the British Militia as 'irregular': throughout their history they were equipped and trained exactly like the line regiments of the regular army, and once embodied in time of war they were fulltime professional soldiers for the duration of their enlistment.) regiment raised in Middlesex in the Home counties of England just before the Crimean War. It later became part of the Middlesex Regiment. Primarily intended for home defence, it served in England and Ireland during Britain's major wars, and saw active service during the Second Boer War. It was converted to the Special Reserve under the Haldane Reforms and supplied reinforcements to the Royal Fusiliers' fighting battalions during World War I. After a shadowy postwar existence the unit was finally disbanded in 1953.

== Background ==
The universal obligation to military service in the Shire levy was long established in England and its legal basis was updated by two acts of 1557 (4 & 5 Ph. & M. cc. 2 and 3), which placed selected men, the 'trained bands', under the command of Lords Lieutenant appointed by the monarch. This is seen as the starting date for the organised county militia in England. It was an important element in the country's defence at the time of the Spanish Armada in the 1580s, and control of the militia was one of the areas of dispute between King Charles I and Parliament that led to the English Civil War. The English Militia was re-established under local control in 1662 after the Restoration of the monarchy, but between periods of national emergency the militia was regularly allowed to decline.

Under threat of French invasion during the Seven Years' War a series of Militia Acts from 1757 reorganised the county militia regiments, the men being conscripted by means of parish ballots (paid substitutes were permitted) to serve for three years. Middlesex was given a quota of three regiments to raise, but failed to do so until the war was nearly over. In peacetime the militia assembled for 28 days' annual training. The Middlesex Militia were first 'embodied' for permanent service in home defence in 1778 during the War of American Independence, and served throughout the French Revolutionary and Napoleonic Wars.

In 1797 an additional ballot was carried out to raise men for the 'Supplementary Militia' to be trained in their spare time, to reinforce the standing militia regiments if required and to form additional temporary regiments. Middlesex had to find an additional 5280 militiamen and form two new regiments, but when the first training of the Middlesex Supplementary Militia was held, very few men appeared. One of the new regiments may have been numbered the 5th Middlesex Militia but if it was ever formed it had disappeared by 1799.

During the French wars, the militia were embodied for a whole generation, and became regiments of full-time professional soldiers (though restricted to service in the British Isles), which the Regular Army increasingly saw as a prime source of recruits. They served in coast defences, manning garrisons, guarding prisoners of war, for internal security, and later for limited overseas service, primarily for garrison duties in Europe. However, after the Battle of Waterloo the militia were disembodied and once again was allowed to decline in the years of the long peace that followed.

== Royal Elthorne Militia ==
The Militia of the United Kingdom was revived by the Militia Act 1852, enacted during a period of international tension. As before, units were raised and administered on a county basis, and filled by voluntary enlistment (although conscription by means of the militia ballot might be used if the counties failed to meet their quotas). Training was for 56 days on enlistment, then for 21–28 days per year, during which the men received full army pay. Under the Act, militia units could be embodied by Royal Proclamation for full-time service in three circumstances:

1. 'Whenever a state of war exists between Her Majesty and any foreign power'.
2. 'In all cases of invasion or upon imminent danger thereof'.
3. 'In all cases of rebellion or insurrection'.

The following year the Middlesex Militia was expanded from three to five regiments. The recruiting area of the 2nd Royal West Middlesex Militia was effectively split, with the new 5th Regiment taking over the north-western part of the county in Elthorne Hundred (one of the ancient subdivisions of the County of Middlesex, centred on Uxbridge and roughly coinciding with the modern London Borough of Hillingdon) while the existing 2nd regiment took over Edmonton Hundred, the most northerly division of Middlesex, then centred on Barnet. The existing regiment was therefore redesignated the '2nd or Edmonton Royal Rifle Regiment of Middlesex Militia', and the new regiment was the 5th or Royal Elthorne Regiment of Middlesex Militia (Note: This is the form of the regimental title when Villiers was gazetted. By 1855 the regiment was designated Light Infantry, and the 'Royal Elthorne' title was officially recognised. The full title was given in a number of different forms, including '5th Royal Elthorne Middlesex (Light Infantry)', 'Royal Elthorne or 5th Middlesex Light Infantry Militia', and 'Royal Elthorne Regiment of Light Infantry Militia'. The Army List used 'Royal Elthorne, or 5th Middlesex (Light Infantry)'.) raised on 16 May 1853 at Uxbridge under Lieutenant-Colonel Commandant Hon Frederick Child Villiers, a former captain in the Coldstream Guards and lieutenant-colonel in the 73rd (Perthshire) Regiment of Foot. All of the regiment's majors and captains had previous experience in the Regular Army.

The 4th Middlesex Militia (the Royal South Middlesex) was formed the same month, giving Middlesex a total of five regiments:

- 1st or Royal East Middlesex Militia
- 2nd Middlesex, or Edmonton Royal Rifle Regiment
- 3rd Middlesex, or Royal Westminster Light Infantry
- 4th or Royal South Middlesex Militia
- 5th Middlesex, or Royal Elthorne Light Infantry Militia

=== Crimean War and Indian Mutiny ===
War having broken out with Russia in 1854 and an expeditionary force sent to the Crimea, the militia began to be called out for home defence. The Royal Elthorne LI was embodied on 5 February 1855 at Uxbridge. Villiers resigned the command and the senior major, Lodge Murray Prior, formerly of the 12th Lancers, was promoted to Lt-Col Commandant on 4 May.

By November the regiment had joined the Royal East Middlesex Militia at Aldershot Camp, where the huts were only just completed. During the early part of 1856 the militia regiments concentrated at Aldershot carried out collective training, and were reviewed by Queen Victoria. The war ended when the Treaty of Paris was signed on 30 March: the concentration at Aldershot was broken up in June and regiments returned to their headquarters. The Royal Elthorne LI was disembodied on 12 June 1856.

A number of militia regiments were also called out to relieve regular troops required for India during the Indian Mutiny, and the Royal Elthorne LI was embodied on 1 October 1857. By the beginning of December the regiment was at Cork in Ireland. In July 1858 it had moved to The Curragh outside Dublin, where it remained until the end of the year when it moved into Dublin and then to Kilkenny before the end of January 1859. It returned to Dublin in June. The regiment left Ireland for Aldershot during November 1859, where it remained until it was disembodied on 31 March 1860.

Thereafter the militia regiments were called out for their annual training. The Militia Reserve introduced in 1867 consisted of present and former militiamen who undertook to serve overseas in case of war.

In September 1871 the British Army held Autumn Manoeuvres for the first time. 3rd Division was made up of militia regiments, the 5th Middlesex under Lt-Col John Hunter (promoted to the command on 13 February 1869) serving in 2nd Brigade along with the 1st and 2nd Royal Surrey Militia (the 1st and 2nd Middlesex were in 1st Brigade, the 3rd in 3rd Brigade). The regiments camped in the Aldershot area and were exercised round Frensham and Chobham Commons.

=== Cardwell Reforms ===
Under the 'Localisation of the Forces' scheme introduced by the Cardwell Reforms of 1872, the militia were brigaded with their local Regular and Volunteer battalions. For the 5th Middlesex this was in Sub-District No 50 (Middlesex & Metropolitan) in Home District, grouped with the 57th Foot and the 77th Foot, together with the Royal East Middlesex Militia and several Rifle Volunteer Corps. The militia now came under the War Office rather than their county lords lieutenant and battalions had a large cadre of permanent staff (about 30). Around a third of the recruits and many young officers went on to join the Regular Army.

Following the Cardwell Reforms a mobilisation scheme began to appear in the Army List from December 1875. This assigned places in an order of battle to Militia units serving Regular units in an 'Active Army' and a 'Garrison Army'. The 5th Middlesex Militia's assigned war station was with the Garrison Army in the Sheerness Division of the Thames and Medway defences.

The sub-districts were intended to establish a brigade depot for their linked battalions: by 1877 Sub-District No 50 had still not done so at its intended site at Hounslow Barracks. Instead the regulars used Woolwich while the militia used Warley Barracks in Essex, the 5th Middlesex retaining its regimental HQ at Uxbridge. However, by 1880 all the linked battalions had moved into Hounslow Barracks, which was shared with the Royal Fusiliers.

== Middlesex Regiment ==
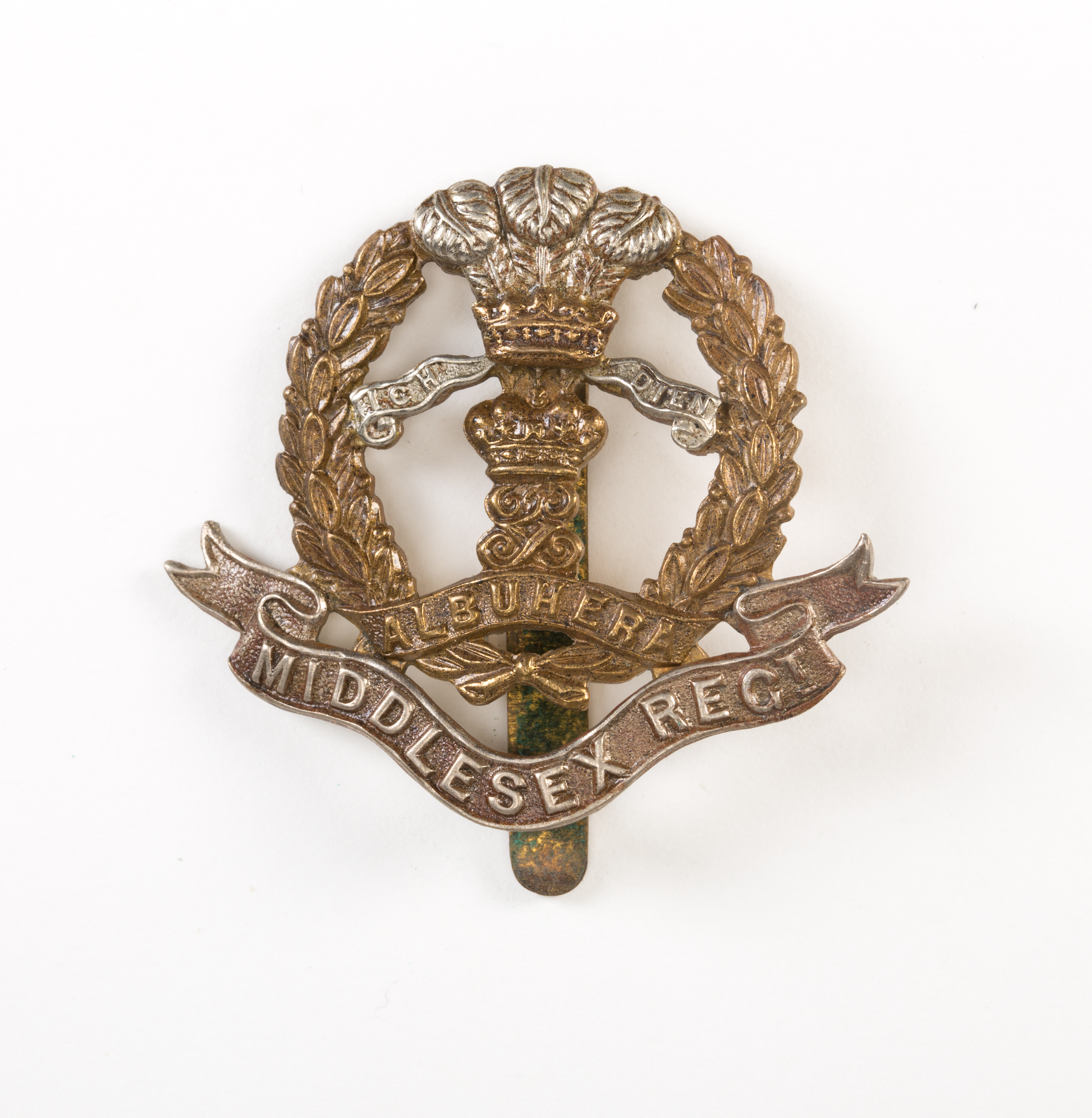
Cap badge of the Middlesex Regiment.

The Childers Reforms took Cardwell's reforms further, with the linked battalions forming single regiments. From 1 July 1881 the 57th and 77th Regiments became the 1st and 2nd Battalions of the Duke of Cambridge's Own (Middlesex Regiment), with the 5th Middlesex Militia becoming the 3rd (Royal Elthorne Militia) Battalion (at the same time the 1st or Royal East Middlesex Militia became the 4th Bn). In 1904 the Middlesex Regiment established its own regimental depot at Mill Hill Barracks,

During the late 1890s several regiments recruiting from large conurbations, including the Middlesex Regiment in the London suburbs, were increased from two to four battalions. When the new 3rd and 4th regular battalions for the Middlesex were authorised in March 1900 the militia battalions were renumbered accordingly, with the 3rd becoming the 5th (Royal Elthorne Militia) Battalion.

=== Second Boer War ===
After the disasters of Black Week at the start of the Second Boer War in December 1899, most of the regular army was sent to South Africa, the militia reserve was called out to reinforce them, and many militia units were embodied to replace them for home defence and to garrison certain overseas stations. The 5th Bn Middlesex was embodied from 4 May to 15 October 1900.

However, the war dragged on and reinforcements were needed. The 5th Middlesex was embodied again on 6 January 1902, and volunteered for overseas service The battalion embarked for South Africa with a strength of 27 officers and 825 other ranks under the command of Lt-Col Vilett Rolleston. It arrived at Cape Town on 15 March and went to Vryburg, and then to Mafeking with detachments at Maribogo, Kraaipan and Maritzani. Later the battalion headquarters moved to Maritzani, where part of the battalion took over duty on the Maritzani blockhouse line. Afterward Battalion HQ moved to Maribogo, with detachments at Bulawayo and Crocodile Pool. The war having ended, the battalion assembled at Mafeking on 27 August where it entrained for Cape Town and embarked for home on 30 August. It was disembodied on 8 September 1902.

During its short service in South Africa the battalion lost eight non-commissioned officers and men killed in action or died of disease. The participants received the Queen's South Africa Medal with the clasps for 'Transvaal', 'Cape Colony' and '1902', and the battalion was awarded the Battle Honour South Africa 1902.

== Special Reserve ==
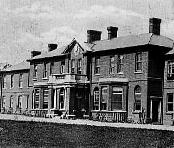
The officers' mess at Mill Hill Barracks in 1910.

After the Boer War, there were moves to reform the Auxiliary Forces (militia, yeomanry and volunteers) to take their place in the six army corps proposed by St John Brodrick as Secretary of State for War. However, little of Brodrick's scheme was carried out. Under the sweeping Haldane Reforms of 1908, the militia was replaced by the Special Reserve, a semi-professional force similar to the previous militia reserve, whose role was to provide reinforcement drafts for regular units serving overseas in wartime. The 5th (Royal Elthorne Militia) Bn became the 5th (Reserve) Battalion, Middlesex Regiment on 2 August 1908.

== World War I ==
=== 5th (Reserve) Battalion ===
On the outbreak of World War I, the battalion mobilised at Mill Hill on 4 August 1914 under Lt-Col C.S. Collison, a retired regular officer, commanding since 2 August 1912. That month together with the 6th Bn it went to its war station in the Thames & Medway Garrison, where it remained for the whole of the war, first at Rochester, then from March 1916 at Chatham, finally In 1917–18 at Gillingham.

The 5th Battalion's role was to equip the Reservists and Special Reservists of the Middlesex Regiment and send them as reinforcement drafts to the Regular battalions serving overseas (the 1st, 2nd and 4th on the Western Front, the 3rd at Salonika). Once the pool of reservists had dried up, the 5th Bn trained thousands of raw recruits for the active service battalions. The 14th and 15th (Reserve) Battalions were formed in October 1914 alongside the 5th and 6th Bns in the Medway towns to provide reinforcements for the 'Kitchener's Army' battalions of the Middlesex (see below).

Under War Office Instruction 106 of 10 November 1915 the battalion was ordered to send a draft of 109 men to the new Machine Gun Training Centre at Grantham where they were to form the basis of a brigade machine-gun company of the new Machine Gun Corps. In addition, 10 men at a time were to undergo training at Grantham as battalion machine gunners. The order stated that 'Great care should be taken in the selection of men for training as machine gunners as only well educated and intelligent men are suitable for this work'.

The battalion continued working after the Armistice with Germany in November 1918. On 2 August 1919 half the remaining personnel were transferred to the 3rd Bn, then on 15 August the other half went to the 1st Bn and the 5th (Reserve) Bn was disembodied.

=== 14th (Reserve) Battalion ===
After Lord Kitchener issued his call for volunteers in August 1914, the battalions of the 1st, 2nd and 3rd New Armies ('K1', 'K2' and 'K3' of 'Kitchener's Army') were quickly formed at the regimental depots. The SR battalions also swelled with new recruits and were soon well above their establishment strength. On 8 October 1914 each SR battalion was ordered to use the surplus to form a service battalion of the 4th New Army ('K4'). Accordingly, the 5th (Reserve) Bn formed the 14th (Service) Bn on 25 October at Gravesend in the Thames & Medway Garrison. It was assigned to 93rd Brigade of 31st Division and began training for active service. By January 1915 it was at Halling, Kent. On 10 April 1915 the War Office decided to convert the K4 battalions into 2nd Reserve units, providing drafts for the K1–K3 battalions in the same way that the SR was doing for the Regular battalions. The battalion became 14th (Reserve) Bn and 93rd Bde became 5th Reserve Brigade. By May 1915 it was at Colchester in Essex where it trained drafts for the 11th, 12th, and 13th (Service) Bns of the Middlesex. In October 1915 it moved to Shoreham-by-Sea in Sussex. On 1 September 1916 the 2nd Reserve battalions were transferred to the Training Reserve (TR) and 14th Middlesex became 24th Training Reserve Battalion. The training staff retained their Middlesex badges. On 24 November it was redesignated 24th Recruit Distribution Battalion, TR; the term 'recruit' was dropped on 25 June 1918. After the war the battalion was disbanded at Hastings on 21 May 1919.

=== Postwar ===
The SR resumed its old title of Militia in 1921 but like most militia units the 5th Middlesex remained in abeyance after World War I. By the outbreak of World War II in 1939, no officers remained listed for the 5th Bn. The Militia was formally disbanded in April 1953.

== Heritage and ceremonial ==
=== Uniforms and insignia ===
As a 'Royal' regiment the Elthorne LI wore blue facings on its scarlet coats. The regimental badge was a light infantry bugle-horn. From 1855 to 1881 the officers' waistbelt plate had a silver bugle-horn surmounted by the Royal cypher in gilt, contained within a circle bearing the title '5th Royal Elthorne Middlesex Militia' in gilt letters. The officers' and men's buttons had the Roman numeral V between the strings of a bugle-horn, contained within a crowned garter inscribed with the title, the whole superimposed on a silver cut star. The V' was later omitted, and may have been replaced by the initials 'R.E.M.'.

In 1881 the battalion adopted the white facings and insignia of the new Middlesex Regiment. However, in 1902 the entire regiment adopted the lemon-yellow facings associated with the 77th Foot.

=== Precedence ===
In earlier days the relative precedence of militia regiments was determined by ballot, and the same number applied to all the regiments in the county. Permanent numbers for individual regiments were balloted in 1833. In 1855 the new regiments formed after the 1852 Act were awarded later numbers, but the 5th Middlesex received 28th (replacing the Pembroke Militia, which had been converted to Militia Artillery). It therefore outranked the 1st Middlesex, leading to their relative precedence as 3rd and 4th (later 5th and 6th) battalions of the Middlesex Regiment.

=== Honorary Colonels ===
After retirement, the following Lieutenant-Colonels Commandant of the regiment were appointed as its Honorary Colonel:

- Lt-Col James Hunter, appointed 9 July 1879
- Col Charles Bashford, appointed 6 October 1897
- Col Villet Rolleston, former CO, appointed 10 March 1903, reappointed to SR 2 August 1908

== See also ==
- Middlesex Militia
- Royal East Middlesex Militia
- Royal West Middlesex Militia
- Royal Westminster Militia
- Royal South Middlesex Militia
- Middlesex Regiment
- Militia (United Kingdom)
- Special Reserve
