= Royal South Middlesex Militia =

Auxiliary unit of the British Army

Royal South, or 4th Middlesex Militia 6th (Reserve) Bn Royal Fusiliers
- Active: 1797–99; 3 May 1853 – 1 April 1953
- Country: United Kingdom
- Branch: Militia/Special Reserve
- Role: Infantry
- Size: 1 Battalion
- Part of: Middlesex Militia
- Garrison/HQ: Hounslow

The 4th Middlesex or Royal South Middlesex Militia (Note: Not to be confused with the 4th Middlesex County Militia Regiment of Massachusetts founded in 1776) was an auxiliary (Note: It is incorrect to describe the British Militia as 'irregular': throughout their history they were equipped and trained exactly like the line regiments of the regular army, and once embodied in time of war they were fulltime professional soldiers for the duration of their enlistment.) regiment raised in Middlesex in the Home counties of England just before the Crimean War. It later became part of the Royal Fusiliers. Primarily intended for home defence, it served in England and Ireland during Britain's major wars. It was converted to the Special Reserve under the Haldane Reforms and supplied reinforcements to the Royal Fusiliers' fighting battalions during World War I. After a shadowy postwar existence the unit was finally disbanded in 1953.

== Background ==
The universal obligation to military service in the Shire levy was long established in England and its legal basis was updated by two acts of 1557 (4 & 5 Ph. & M. cc. 2 and 3), which placed selected men, the 'trained bands', under the command of Lords Lieutenant appointed by the monarch. This is seen as the starting date for the organised county militia in England. It was an important element in the country's defence at the time of the Spanish Armada in the 1580s, and control of the militia was one of the areas of dispute between King Charles I and Parliament that led to the English Civil War. The English Militia was re-established under local control in 1662 after the Restoration of the monarchy, but between periods of national emergency the militia was regularly allowed to decline.

Under threat of French invasion during the Seven Years' War a series of Militia Acts from 1757 reorganised the county militia regiments, the men being conscripted by means of parish ballots (paid substitutes were permitted) to serve for three years. Middlesex was given a quota of three regiments to raise, but failed to do so until the war was nearly over. In peacetime the militia assembled for 28 days' annual training. The Middlesex Militia were first 'embodied' for permanent service in home defence in 1778 during the War of American Independence, and served throughout the French Revolutionary and Napoleonic Wars.

In 1797 an additional ballot was carried out to raise men for the 'Supplementary Militia' to be trained in their spare time, to reinforce the standing militia regiments if required and to form additional temporary regiments. Middlesex had to find an additional 5280 militiamen and form two new regiments, one of which (the 4th Middlesex Militia) was the South Middlesex Militia. The regiment was reduced in 1799.

During the French wars, the militia were embodied for a whole generation, and became regiments of full-time professional soldiers (though restricted to service in the British Isles), which the Regular Army increasingly saw as a prime source of recruits. They served in coast defences, manning garrisons, guarding prisoners of war, for internal security, and later for limited overseas service, primarily for garrison duties in Europe. However, after the Battle of Waterloo the militia were disembodied and once again was allowed to decline in the years of the long peace that followed.

== Royal South Middlesex Militia ==
The Militia of the United Kingdom was revived by the Militia Act 1852, enacted during a period of international tension. As before, units were raised and administered on a county basis, and filled by voluntary enlistment (although conscription by means of the militia ballot might be used if the counties failed to meet their quotas). Training was for 56 days on enlistment, then for 21–28 days per year, during which the men received full army pay. Under the Act, militia units could be embodied by Royal Proclamation for full-time service in three circumstances:

1. 'Whenever a state of war exists between Her Majesty and any foreign power'.
2. 'In all cases of invasion or upon imminent danger thereof'.
3. 'In all cases of rebellion or insurrection'.

One of the new regiments created was the Royal South, or 4th Middlesex Militia, formed on 3 May 1853 at Hounslow. The Lord Lieutenant of Middlesex transferred Lieutenant-Colonel Edward Bagot (a half-pay Regular Army officer, formerly of the 60th Rifles), from command of the Royal Westminster Militia to command the new regiment. The 5th Middlesex Militia (the Royal Elthorne Light Infantry) was formed the same month, giving Middlesex a total of five regiments:

- 1st or Royal East Middlesex Militia
- 2nd Middlesex, or Edmonton Royal Rifle Regiment
- 3rd Middlesex, or Royal Westminster Light Infantry
- 4th or Royal South Middlesex Militia
- 5th Middlesex, or Royal Elthorne Light Infantry

=== Crimean War and Indian Mutiny ===
War having broken out with Russia in 1854 and an expeditionary force sent to the Crimea, the militia began to be called out for home defence. The first of the Middlesex regiments to be called out was the Royal South Middlesex (RSM), embodied in July 1854. Initially remained at Hounslow until moving to Gosport by the beginning of December. and then shifting to Portsmouth in March 1855.

When Bagot resigned in 1855, his second-in-command (and brother-in-law of Bagot's wife), Major John Scriven (formerly of the 51st Foot), was promoted on 15 September 1855 to succeed him as Lt-Col Commandant of the regiment.

The regiment was at Cahir in Ireland by October 1855, shortly afterwards moving to Cork. It remained stationed there until February 1856 when it transferred to Buttevant. The RSM returned home and was disembodied on 21 July 1856

A number of militia regiments were also called out to relieve regular troops required for India during the Indian Mutiny, and the Royal South Middlesex was embodied on 1 October 1857. By the beginning of December the regiment was at Aldershot under orders for Dublin, and it was stationed at Athlone from January 1858. The RSM was recalled home and disembodied on 4 June 1858.

Thereafter the militia regiments were called out for their annual training. The Militia Reserve introduced in 1867 consisted of present and former militiamen who undertook to serve overseas in case of war.

On 3 August 1872, Lt-Col Scriven was appointed Honorary Colonel of the regiment, and was succeeded as Lt-Col Commandant by A.C. FitzJames, formerly a lieutenant in the 93rd Highlanders.

=== Cardwell Reforms ===
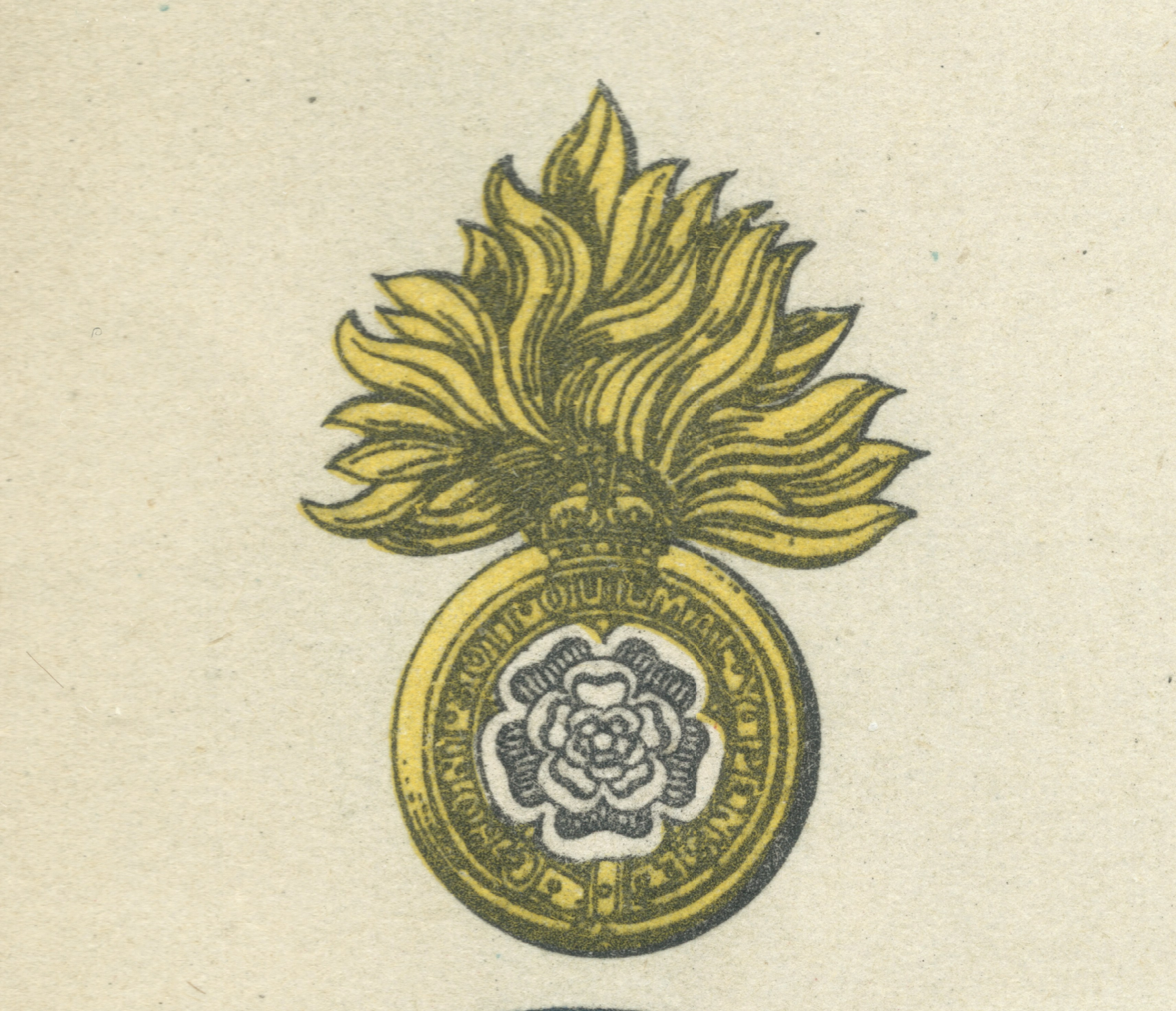
Cap badge of the Royal Fusiliers.

Under the 'Localisation of the Forces' scheme introduced by the Cardwell Reforms of 1872, the militia were brigaded with their local Regular and Volunteer battalions. For the RSM this was in Sub-District No 49 (Middlesex & Metropolitan in Home District, grouped with the two battalions of the 7th Regiment of Foot (the Royal Fusiliers (City of London Regiment)), together with the Royal Westminster Militia and several Rifle Volunteer Corps. The militia now came under the War Office rather than their county lords lieutenant and battalions had a large cadre of permanent staff (about 30). Around a third of the recruits and many young officers went on to join the Regular Army.

Following the Cardwell Reforms a mobilisation scheme began to appear in the Army List from December 1875. This assigned Regular and Militia units to places in an order of battle of corps, divisions and brigades for the 'Active Army', even though these formations were entirely theoretical, with no staff or services assigned. The Royal South Middlesex Militia was assigned to 1st Brigade of 3rd Division, III Corps. The brigade, including the Royal London Militia and West Kent Militia, would have mustered at Tunbridge Wells in time of war.

Lieutenant-Col Hon Charles Ernest Edgcumbe, formerly of the Grenadier Guards, was appointed Lt-Col Commandant of the battalion on 28 August 1880.

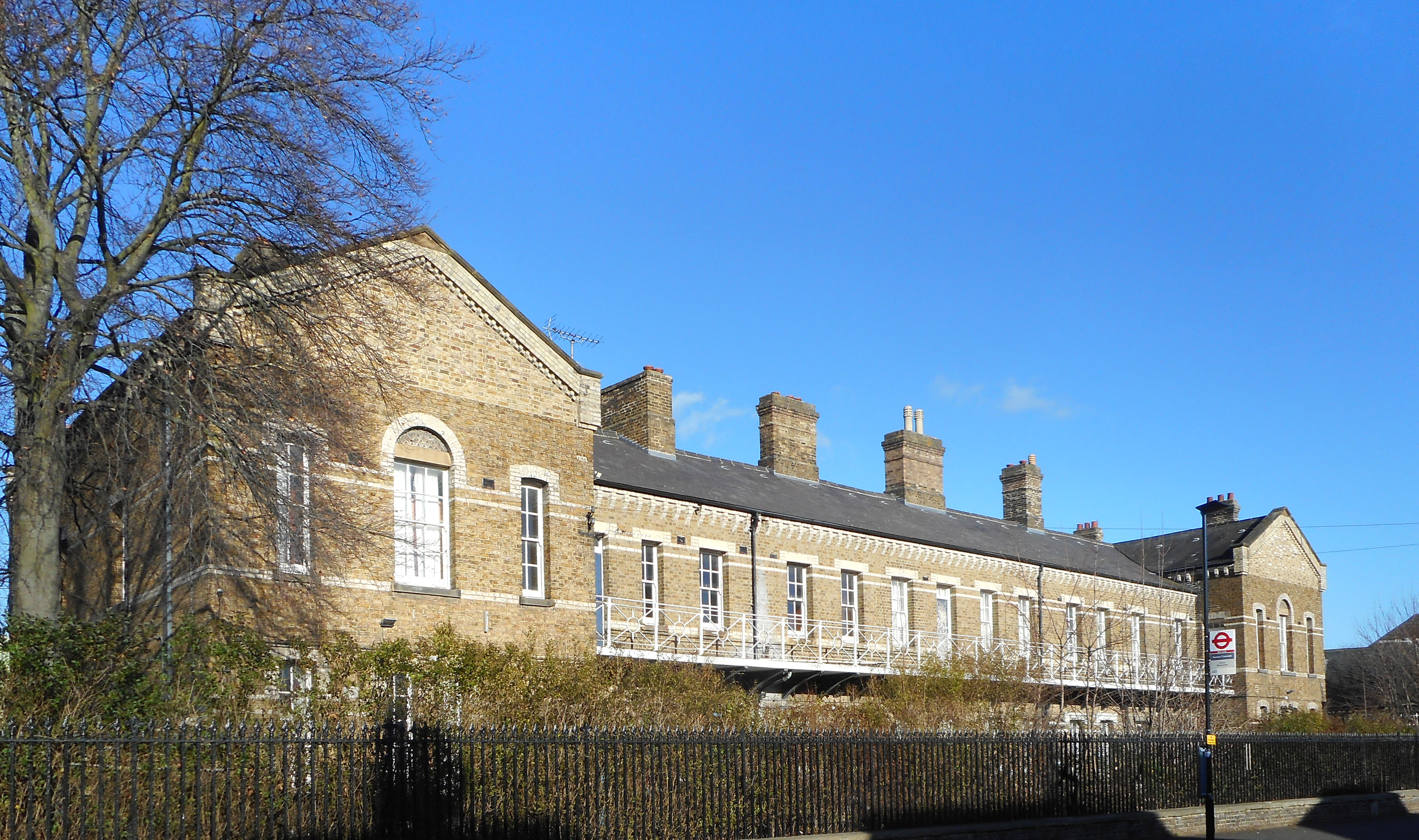
'Fusiliers Block' built at Hounslow Barracks in 1876 when it was expanded to act as the regimental depot of the Royal Fusiliers.

== Royal Fusiliers ==
The Childers Reforms of 1881 took Cardwell's reforms further, with the militia formally joining their affiliated Regular regiments as sequentially numbered battalions. The RSM became the 5th (Royal South Middlesex Militia) Battalion, Royal Fusiliers, on 1 July 1881 (the Royal Westminster or 3rd Middlesex Militia formed the 4th Bn Royal Fusiliers). The Royal Fusiliers established its regimental depot at Hounslow Barracks, which entailed no change for the 5th Bn, which had always been based in the town.

During the late 1890s several regiments recruiting from large conurbations, including the Royal Fusiliers in London and its suburbs, were increased from two to four battalions. When the new 3rd and 4th regular battalions for the Royal Fusiliers were authorised in April 1898 the militia battalions were renumbered accordingly, with the 5th becoming the 7th (Royal South Middlesex Militia) Battalion.

=== Second Boer War ===
After the disasters of Black Week at the start of the Second Boer War in December 1899, most of the regular army was sent to South Africa, the militia reserve was called out to reinforce them, and many militia units were embodied to replace them for home defence and to garrison certain overseas stations. The 7th Bn Royal Fusiliers was embodied from 14 May 1900. However, unlike a number of other militia battalions it did not serve in South Africa or in overseas garrisons, and was disembodied on 15 October the same year.

== Special Reserve ==
After the Boer War, there were moves to reform the Auxiliary Forces (militia, yeomanry and volunteers) to take their place in the six army corps proposed by St John Brodrick as Secretary of State for War. However, little of Brodrick's scheme was carried out. Under the sweeping Haldane Reforms of 1908, the militia was replaced by the Special Reserve, a semi-professional force similar to the previous militia reserve, whose role was to provide reinforcement drafts for regular units serving overseas in wartime. The 7th (Royal South Middlesex Militia) Bn became the 6th (Reserve) Battalion, Royal Fusiliers on 28 June 1908.

== World War I ==
=== 6th (Reserve) Battalion ===
On the outbreak of World War I the 6th Royal Fusiliers mobilised on 4 August 1914 at Hounslow under Lt-Col R.C. Batt, MVO, a retired regular captain, who had commanded the battalion since 15 August 1913.. Within a few days it proceeded (with the 5th (Reserve) Bn) to its war station at Dover. As well as its defensive duties, its role was to equip the Reservists and Special Reservists of the Royal Fusiliers and send them as reinforcement drafts to the Regular battalions serving on the Western Front. The 5th and 6th Bns assisted in the formation of 14th and 15th (Reserve) Bns (see below). The reserve battalions at times were each over 4000 strong. At the end of 1917 the 6th Bn went to Carrickfergus in Ireland, where it gave shelter to about 600 men of the American Expeditionary Forces rescued after their troopship, the SS Tuscania, was torpedoed of the Irish coast in early 1918. The battalion remained at Carrickfergus until the end of the war.

After the Armistice with Germany the 6th Bn remained in existence until it was disembodied on 6 June 1919.

=== 15th (Reserve) Battalion ===
After Lord Kitchener issued his call for volunteers in August 1914, the battalions of the 1st, 2nd and 3rd New Armies ('K1', 'K2' and 'K3' of 'Kitchener's Army') were quickly formed at the regimental depots. The SR battalions also swelled with new recruits and were soon well above their establishment strength. On 8 October 1914 each SR battalion was ordered to use the surplus to form a service battalion of the 4th New Army ('K4'). Accordingly, the 6th (Reserve) Bn at Dover formed the 15th (Service) Battalion of the Royal Fusiliers on 31 October 1914. It trained for active service as part of 95th Brigade in 32nd Division. On 10 April 1915 the War Office decided to convert the K4 battalions into 2nd Reserve units, to provide drafts for the K1–K3 battalions in the same way that the SR was doing for the Regular battalions. The Royal Fusiliers battalion became 15th (Reserve) Battalion in 7th Reserve Brigade and moved with it to Purfleet in Essex in May 1915. It moved with the brigade to Shoreham-by-Sea in September 1915 and returned to Dover in March 1916. On 1 September 1916 the 2nd Reserve battalions were transferred to the Training Reserve (TR) and the battalion was redesignated 32nd Training Reserve Bn, still in 7th Reserve Bde at Dover. The training staff retained their Royal Fusiliers badges. It was disbanded on 14 December 1917 at Clipstone Camp.

=== Postwar ===
The SR resumed its old title of Militia in 1921 but like most militia battalions the 5th Royal Fusiliers remained in abeyance after World War I. By the outbreak of World War II in 1939, no officers remained listed for the battalion. The Militia was formally disbanded in April 1953.

== Heritage and ceremonial ==
=== Uniforms and insignia ===
Coat of arms of the County of Middlesex.

As a 'Royal' regiment the facings on the South Middlesex Militia's red coats was always blue. The short-lived supplementary militia regiment of 1797–99 had also worn blue facings. Prior to 1881 the officers' helmet plate bore the Coat of arms of Middlesex (three Saxon Seaxes in pale).

In 1881 the regiment adopted the uniforms and insignia of the Royal Fusiliers.

=== Precedence ===
In earlier days the relative precedence of militia regiments was determined by ballot, and the same number applied to all the regiments in the county. Permanent numbers for individual regiments were balloted in 1833. In 1855 the new regiments formed after the 1852 Act were awarded later numbers, the 4th Middlesex receiving 128th (replacing the Waterford Militia, which had been converted to Militia Artillery). The regimental number was only a subsidiary title and most regiments paid little attention to it.

=== Honorary Colonels ===
After retirement, the following Lieutenant-Colonels Commandant of the regiment were appointed as its Honorary Colonel:

- John Scriven, appointed 3 August 1872
- A.C. FitzJames, appointed 28 August 1880
- Hon Charles Ernest Edgcumbe, appointed 11 February 1888, reappointed to SR 29 June 1908, died 14 September 1915

=== Memorial ===
The 6th (Reserve) Battalion is included in the inscription on the Royal Fusiliers War Memorial in High Holborn, London.

== See also ==
- Middlesex Militia
- Royal East Middlesex Militia
- Royal West Middlesex Militia
- Royal Westminster Militia
- Royal Elthorne Light Infantry Militia
- Royal Fusiliers
- Militia (United Kingdom)
- Special Reserve
