= John Fenton-Cawthorne =

- Born: 5 January 1753
- Died: 1 March 1831 (aged 78)
- Occupation: British Member of Parliament

John Fenton-Cawthorne (5 January 1753 – 1 March 1831) was a British Tory politician, who served as MP for Lincoln between 1783 and 1796 and as MP for Lancaster for four terms in the early 19th century.

Fenton-Cawthorne was born in 1753 to Elizabeth née Cawthorne and James Fenton of Lancaster, a barrister, and educated at Queen's College, Oxford (1771) and Gray's Inn (1792). He succeeded to the Cawthorne estate in 1781 and took the additional surname of Cawthorne.

He was first elected as an MP for Lincoln in January 1783 and was an opponent of the abolition of the slave trade.

On 27 November 1795, as Colonel of the Westminster Regiment of the Middlesex Militia, Fenton-Cawthorne was arraigned before a court-martial on 14 charges including that of embezzling "marching guineas" paid to militiamen of the British Army. Found guilty on seven of the charges, he was cashiered as "unworthy of serving His Majesty in any military capacity whatever" having "acted fraudulently and in a scandalous and infamous manner".

Fenton-Cawthorne returned to Parliament in 1806 as MP for Lancaster. His older brother also entered Parliament at the same time as MP for Fife.

He married Frances Delaval (1759–1838), the daughter and coheiress of John Delaval, 1st Baron Delaval.

Fenton-Cawthorne died on 1 March 1831 in Hanover Street, Hanover Square, London.
