= Royal West Middlesex Militia =

Auxiliary unit of the British Army

Royal West Middlesex Militia 2nd, or Edmonton Royal Rifle Regiment of Middlesex Militia 6th (Extra Reserve) Battalion King's Royal Rifle Corps
- Active: 1662–1 April 1953
- Country: England 1662–1707; Kingdom of Great Britain (1707–1800); United Kingdom (1801–1953)
- Branch: Militia/Special Reserve
- Type: Infantry
- Size: 1 Battalion
- Part of: King's Royal Rifle Corps
- Garrison/HQ: Uxbridge; Enfield; Barnet; Upper Barracks, Winchester

Commanders
- Notable commanders: George Byng, 2nd Earl of Strafford; George Byng, 3rd Earl of Strafford

The Royal West Middlesex Militia, later the Edmonton Royal Rifle Regiment, was an auxiliary (Note: It is incorrect to describe the British Militia as 'irregular': throughout their history they were equipped and trained exactly like the line regiments of the regular army, and once embodied in time of war they were fulltime professional soldiers for the duration of their enlistment.) regiment reorganised in Middlesex in the Home counties of England during the 18th Century from earlier precursor units. It later became part of the King's Royal Rifle Corps (KRRC). Primarily intended for home defence, it served in England and Ireland (and briefly in Southern France) during Britain's major wars. It was converted to the Special Reserve under the Haldane Reforms and supplied reinforcements to the KRRC's fighting battalions during World War I. After a shadowy postwar existence the unit was finally disbanded in 1953.

== Background ==
The universal obligation to military service in the Shire levy was long established in England and its legal basis was updated by two acts of 1557 (4 & 5 Ph. & M. cc. 2 and 3), which placed selected men, the 'trained bands', under the command of Lords Lieutenant appointed by the monarch. This is seen as the starting date for the organised county militia in England. It was an important element in the country's defence at the time of the Spanish Armada in the 1580s, and control of the militia was one of the areas of dispute between King Charles I and Parliament that led to the English Civil War.

During the Civil War a great ring of fortifications (the 'Lines of Communication') was constructed round London, encompassing Westminster and the suburban parishes of Middlesex, whose trained bands came under the London Militia Committee. Middlesex was left with a single regiment recruited from the rural parishes outside the lines, largely in the north and west of the county. This regiment saw some service during the war.

The English Militia was re-established under local control in 1662 after the Restoration of the monarchy. Middlesex had three regiments: the 'Red Regiment of Westminster', the 'Blewe Regiment' recruited from 'within the Bills of mortality' (ie the suburban parishes included within the London health district), and the 'County Regiment', recruited from rural parishes. In 1697 the latter was commanded by Colonel R. Shoreditch and consisted of 603 men in six companies, together with a County Troop of Horse with 85 men. These arrangements appear to have continued until at least 1722, but thereafter the militia was allowed to decline.

== West Middlesex Militia ==
Under threat of French invasion during the Seven Years' War a series of Militia Acts from 1757 re-established county militia regiments, the men being conscripted by means of parish ballots (paid substitutes were permitted) to serve for three years. There was a property qualification for officers, who were commissioned by the lord lieutenant. An adjutant and drill sergeants were to be provided to each regiment from the Regular Army, and arms and accoutrements would be supplied when the county had secured 60 per cent of its quota of recruits. Middlesex was given a quota of 1600 men to raise, but failed to do so – possibly because the Lord Lieutenant of Middlesex, the Duke of Newcastle, was Leader of the Opposition, who had opposed the Militia Acts. A patriotic ballad of the time declared:

All over the land they'll find such a stand,
From our English Militia Men ready at hand,
Though in Sussex and Middlesex folks are but fiddlesticks,
While an old fiddlestick has the command

(the 'old fiddlestick' was Newcastle, who was also powerful in Sussex).

Claiming insufficient numbers of qualified officers, Newcastle suspended the execution of the Act in Middlesex for two years. However, opinion in the county shifted and in July 1760, the lieutenancy began forming three regiments (Western, Eastern and Westminster) and the arms and accoutrements were supplied from the Tower of London on 7 and 12 August. By then the war was going in Britain's favour and the threat of invasion had lifted: no further militia were required, and the Middlesex regiments were not actually embodied before the war ended in 1762. Parliament did however provide the money to continue training the militia in peacetime (two periods of 14 days or one period of 28 days each year).

The militia were called out in 1778 after the outbreak of the War of American Independence, when the country was threatened with invasion by the Americans' allies, France and Spain. The three regiments of Middlesex Militia were 'embodied' for permanent duty for the first time on 31 March 1778, with the 1st Middlesex Western Militia at Uxbridge.

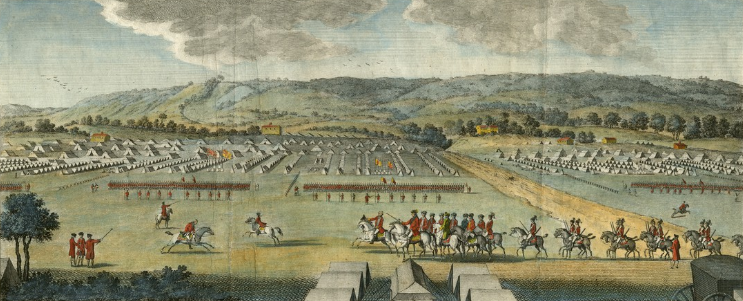
A review at Coxheath Camp.

During the summer of 1778 the West Middlesex Militia under Colonel G.J. Cooke was at Coxheath Camp near Maidstone in Kent, which was the army's largest training camp. Here the completely raw militia were exercised as part of a division alongside regular troops while providing a reserve in case of French invasion of South East England. Afterwards, the regiment was sent to the usual winter quarters, spread out amongst inns over several towns and villages. The regiment was ordered to enlarge these quarters, even though Col Cooke complained that his men were already so dispersed that he could not be held responsible for their discipline and 'oeconomy' (internal economy). He had 32 men absent with leave because there were no quarters for them, 40 could not be given medical care, and one detachment had to march in from 3–4 miles (4.8–6.4 km) away every time there was a parade.

The Peace of Paris ended the war in 1783, but the militia had already been disembodied in 1782.

From 1784 to 1792 the militia were assembled for their 28 days' annual peacetime training, but to save money only two-thirds of the men were actually mustered each year. Nicholas Bayly was appointed Colonel of the West Middlesex Militia on 15 April 1788.

=== French Revolutionary and Napoleonic Wars ===
The militia were already being embodied when Revolutionary France declared war on Britain on 1 February 1793. Middlesex remained the worst 'black spot' for militia recruitment: in August 1793 the Western Regiment was 90 men short of the number it should have embodied. Only 11 out of 477 men in the regiment were balloted men serving as principals, all the others being hired substitutes.

In June 1793 both the East and West Middlesex regiments marched to join a large militia training encampment at Broadwater Common, Waterdown Forest, outside Tunbridge Wells. The whole camp moved to Ashdown Forest at the beginning of August and then to Brighton for two weeks before returning to Broadwater Common. The camp broke up in the autumn and the regiments went to their separate winter quarters.

The French Revolutionary War and Napoleonic Wars saw a new phase for the English militia: they were embodied for a whole generation, and became regiments of full-time professional soldiers (though restricted to service in the British Isles), which the Regular Army increasingly saw as a prime source of recruits. They served in coast defences, manning garrisons, guarding prisoners of war, and for internal security, while their traditional local defence duties were taken over by the Volunteers and mounted Yeomanry.

In 1804 the Middlesex Militia was awarded the prefix 'Royal', the regiment becoming the 2nd Royal West Middlesex Regiment of Militia.

During the summer of 1805, when Napoleon was massing his 'Army of England' at Boulogne for a projected invasion, the regiment was part of a militia brigade under Maj-Gen Alexander McKenzie defending Hull. On 1 September 1805, the regiment had 865 men in 10 companies under the command of Lt-Col Sir David Rae, 2nd Baronet.

The Interchange Act 1811 passed in July allowed English militia regiments to serve in Ireland and vice versa, and the Royal West Middlesex did so for two years. From November 1813 the militia were also invited to volunteer for limited overseas service, primarily for garrison duties in Europe. Twenty-one officers and 560 other ranks of the Royal West Middlesex volunteered for this service, and formed the bulk of the 3rd Provisional Battalion, commanded by their own lieutenant-colonel, Edward Bayly. It served in a militia brigade commanded by the Marquess of Buckingham, colonel of the Royal Bucks Militia whose volunteers formed the 1st Provisional Bn. The brigade embarked on 10–11 March 1814 and joined the Earl of Dalhousie's division that had occupied Bordeaux just as the war was ending. The brigade did not form part of the Army of Occupation after the abdication of Napoleon and returned to England in June. Having been disembodied the regiment was called out again on 29 June 1815 during the short Waterloo Campaign and served in the UK until it was disembodied on 25 August 1816.

After Waterloo there was a long peace. Although officers continued to be commissioned into the militia and ballots were still held until they were suspended by the Militia Act 1829, the regiments were rarely assembled for training and the permanent staffs of sergeants and drummers (who were occasionally used to maintain public order) were progressively reduced. Sir John Gibbons, 4th Baronet, was appointed colonel of the Royal West Middlesex on 11 July 1831, and from 27 December 1837 his lieutenant-colonel was the Rt Hon George Byng, who had been a captain in the Rifle Brigade. Gibbons died in 1844 and was succeeded as colonel on 29 April 1844 by Byng, who took the courtesy title of Viscount Enfield from 1847 when his father, Field Marshal Sir John Byng, was created Earl of Strafford.

== Edmonton Royal Rifles ==
The Militia of the United Kingdom was revived by the Militia Act 1852, enacted during a period of international tension. As before, units were raised and administered on a county basis, and filled by voluntary enlistment (although conscription by means of the militia ballot might be used if the counties failed to meet their quotas). Training was for 56 days on enlistment, then for 21–28 days per year, during which the men received full army pay. Under the Act, militia units could be embodied by Royal Proclamation for full-time service in three circumstances:

1. 'Whenever a state of war exists between Her Majesty and any foreign power'.
2. 'In all cases of invasion or upon imminent danger thereof'.
3. 'In all cases of rebellion or insurrection'.

The Royal West Middlesex was designated a Light Infantry regiment in 1852. The following year the Middlesex Militia was expand from three to five regiments. The recruiting area of the Royal West Middlesex was effectively split, with the new 5th regiment taking over the north-western part of the county in Elthorne Hundred, one of the ancient subdivisions of the county, centred on Uxbridge, while the existing 2nd regiment took over Edmonton Hundred, the most northerly division of Middlesex, then centred on Barnet. The regiment was therefore redesignated the 2nd or Edmonton Royal Rifle Regiment of Middlesex Militia on 7 March 1853 and adopted Rifle green uniforms. At first the regiment was stationed at Enfield but in 1855 it built a new Militia Barracks at Barnet. (Note: Barnet Urban District was transferred from Middlesex to Hertfordshire under the Local Government Act 1888.)

As part of the 1852 reforms, the post of colonel in the militia was abolished, but existing colonels such as Viscount Enfield retained their positions. Enfield's eldest son, the Hon George Byng, was commissioned as his lt-col on 30 October 1853.

=== Crimean War ===
War having broken out with Russia in 1854 and an expeditionary force sent to the Crimea, the militia began to be called out for home defence. By the beginning of July 1855 the Edmonton Rifles had been embodied at Barnet, where it remained until the militia were disembodied in May 1856 after the Treaty of Paris ended the war.

Although the 4th and 5th Middlesex Militia were embodied in 1857 to relieve regular troops for service against the Indian Mutiny, the number of regiments required was smaller, and the Edmonton Rifles were not called upon.

On 5 December 1859, Col Viscount Enfield, now 2nd Earl of Strafford, became the regiment's Honorary Colonel, and his son George, now Viscount Enfield by courtesy, became Lt-Col Commandant.

The militia regiments were routinely called out for their annual training. The Militia Reserve introduced in 1867 consisted of present and former militiamen who undertook to serve overseas in case of war.

From 1867 the annual training of some militia regiments was held at Aldershot in conjunction with the regular division stationed there. The Edmonton Rifles were included in the experiment in 1868, carrying out their training in camp, and the four weeks ended with a divisional field day. In September 1871 the British Army held Autumn Manoeuvres for the first time. 3rd Division was made up of militia regiments, the Edmonton Rifles under the command of Maj Henry Grenfell serving in 1st Brigade along with the Royal East Middlesex, the Royal London and the 2nd Tower Hamlets (the 5th Middlesex were in 2nd Brigade and the 3rd in 3rd Brigade). The regiments camped in the Aldershot area and were exercised round Frensham and Chobham Commons. On 21 September 1871 Viscount Enfield replaced his father as Hon Col of the regiment, and Maj Henry Grenfell was promoted to Lt-Col Commandant.

=== Cardwell Reforms ===
Under the 'Localisation of the Forces' scheme introduced by the Cardwell Reforms of 1872, the militia were brigaded with their local Regular and Volunteer battalions on 1 April 1873. For the Edmonton Rifles this was in Brigade No 51 & 52 (60th Rifles) in Home District, grouped with the four Regular battalions of the 60th Rifles, together with the Royal London Militia and numerous Rifle Volunteer Corps from London and Middlesex. The Edmonton Rifles already had links with the regiment, wearing a uniform modelled on that of the 60th, and with some of its officers having formerly served in the 60th. The Rifles Depot was at Winchester in Hampshire, but the Edmonton rifles retained its headquarters in Barnet. The militia now came under the War Office rather than their county lords lieutenant and battalions had a large cadre of permanent staff (about 30). Around a third of the recruits and many young officers went on to join the Regular Army.

Following the Cardwell Reforms a mobilisation scheme began to appear in the Army List from December 1875. This assigned Regular and Militia units to places in an order of battle of corps, divisions and brigades for the 'Active Army', even though these formations were entirely theoretical, with no staff or services assigned. The 1st Royal East, 2nd Edmonton Rifles and 3rd Westminster Regiments of Middlesex Militia constituted 2nd Brigade of 3rd Division, III Corps. The brigade would have mustered at Maidstone in Kent in time of war.

== King's Royal Rifle Corps ==
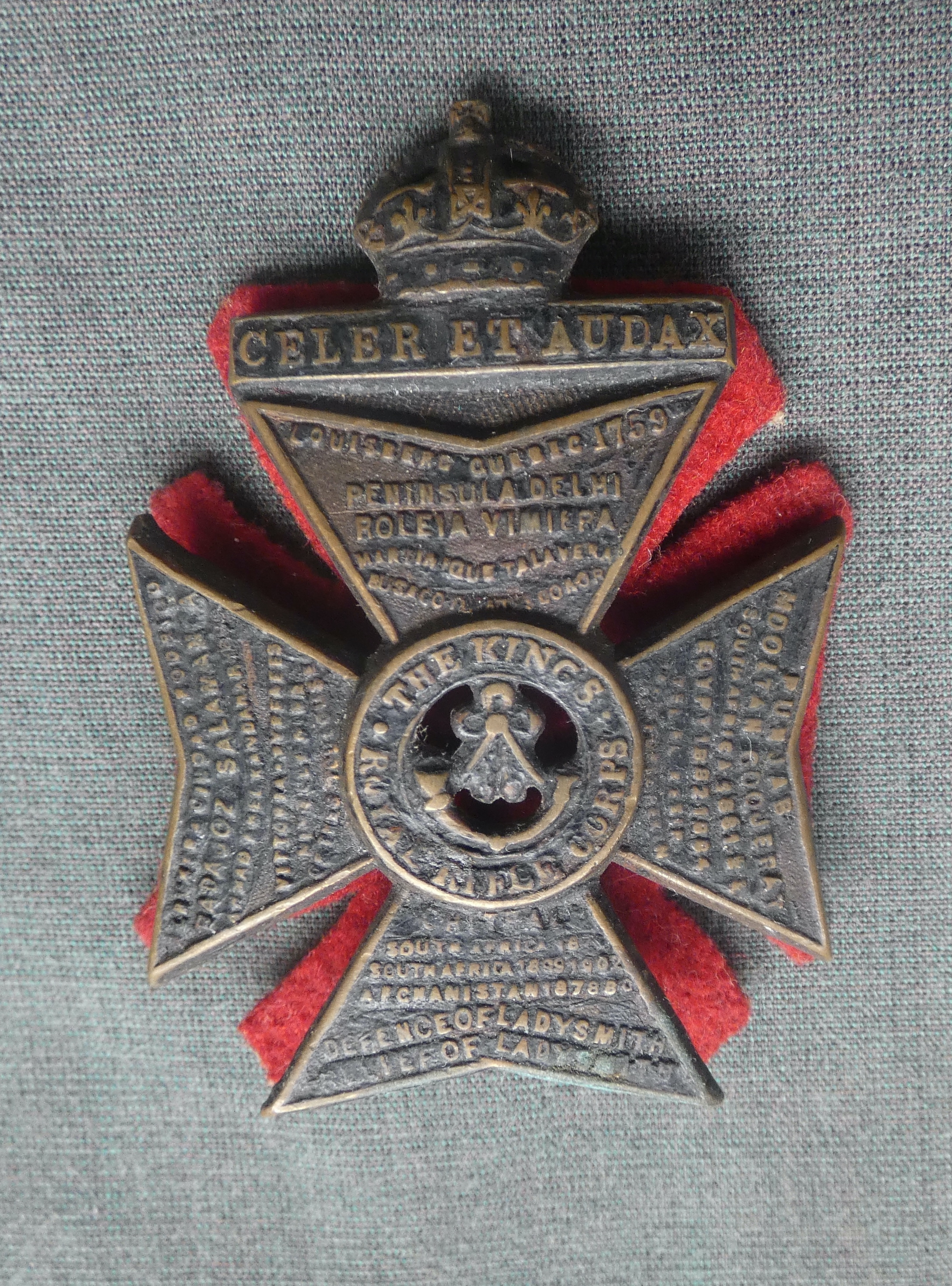
Cap badge of the King's Royal Rifle Corps.

The Childers Reforms of 1881 took Cardwell's reforms further, with the militia formally joining their linked regiments. The 60th Rifles became the King's Royal Rifle Corps (KRRC), and the Edmonton Rifles became the 7th (Royal 2nd Middlesex Militia) Battalion on 1 July 1881.

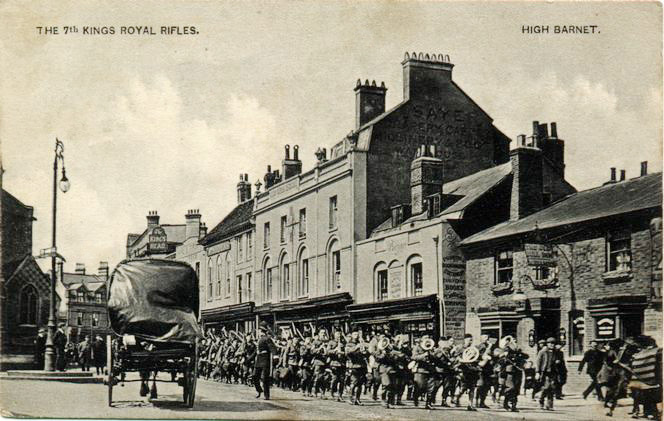
7th Battalion, KRRC, marching from their Depot in Barnet in 1900.

=== Second Boer War ===
After the disasters of Black Week at the start of the Second Boer War in December 1899, most of the Regular Army was sent to South Africa, and many militia units were embodied to replace them. The 7th KRRC was embodied from 23 January to 31 July 1900. However, unlike some militia battalions it did not serve overseas.

== Special Reserve ==
After the Boer War, there were moves to reform the Auxiliary Forces (militia, yeomanry and volunteers) to take their place in the six army corps proposed by St John Brodrick as Secretary of State for War. However, little of Brodrick's scheme was carried out. Under the sweeping Haldane Reforms of 1908, the militia was replaced by the Special Reserve, a semi-professional force similar to the previous militia reserve, whose role was to provide reinforcement drafts for regular units serving overseas in wartime. The 7th (Royal 2nd Middlesex Militia) Bn, KRRC, became the 6th (Extra Reserve) Battalion on 26 June 1908. At the same time the battalion left Barnet and moved to the Rifles Depot at Upper Barracks, Winchester.

== World War I ==
=== 6th (Reserve) Battalion ===
On the outbreak of World War I the 6th KRRC mobilised at Winchester under Lt-Col the Hon J.R. Brownlow, a retired regular major, who had commanded the battalion since 1 October 1912. Within a few days it proceeded (with the 5th (Reserve) Bn) to its war station at Sheerness, where it served in the Thames and Medway Garrison. As well as its defensive duties, its role was to equip the Reservists and Special Reservists of the KRRC and send them as reinforcement drafts to the Regular battalions serving overseas (the 1st, 2nd and 4th on the Western Front, the 3rd at Salonika). The 5th and 6th (Reserve) Bns also formed the 14th and 15th (Reserve) Bns of the KRRC at Sheerness to supply reinforcements to the Kitchener's Army units (see below). From 1917 to the Armistice with Germany the 6th Bn was at Queenborough in the Thames & Medway Garrison.

=== 15th (Reserve) Battalion ===
After Lord Kitchener issued his call for volunteers in August 1914, the battalions of the 1st, 2nd and 3rd New Armies ('K1', 'K2' and 'K3' of 'Kitchener's Army') were quickly formed at the regimental depots. The SR battalions also swelled with new recruits and were soon well above their establishment strength. On 8 October 1914 each SR battalion was ordered to use the surplus to form a service battalion of the 4th New Army ('K4'). Accordingly, the 6th (Extra Reserve) Bn at Sheerness formed the 15th (Service) Bn on 25 October. It was assigned to 92nd Brigade of 31st Division alongside 14th (Service) Bn and began training for active service. In November they moved to billets in Westcliff-on-Sea in Essex. On 10 April 1915 the War Office decided to convert the K4 battalions into 2nd Reserve units, providing drafts for the K1–K3 battalions in the same way that the SR was doing for the Regular battalions. The battalion became 15th (Reserve) Bn and 92nd Bde became 4th Reserve Brigade. In May 1915 the battalions moved to Belhus Park, and then in September to Seaford in Sussex with 4th Reserve Bde, where they trained drafts for the 7th, 8th, 9th, 10th, 11th, 12th, and 13th (Service) Bns of the KRRC.

On 1 September 1916 the 2nd Reserve battalions were transferred to the Training Reserve (TR) and 15th KRRC became 18th Training Reserve Battalion. The training staff retained their KRRC badges. The battalion was with 4th Reserve Bde at Northampton when on 27 October 1917 it was transferred to the Rifle Brigade as 53rd (Young Soldier) Bn, and continued carrying out initial training until, the end of the war. Early in 1919 it was decided to send the young soldier battalions to the occupation force in Germany (the British Army of the Rhine) to take the place of fighting battalions that were being demobilised. On 8 February 53rd (YS) Bn Rifle Brigade was converted into a service battalion and on 21 March it sailed from Tilbury to Antwerp under Lt-Col Hon Nigel Gathorne-Hardy. It travelled by train to Düren, south-west of Cologne, where it went into billets. Here it joined 6th Bde of 2nd Division, but on 7 April it moved by train to Bedburg, where it was billeted in a linoleum factory. Together with 51st and 52nd (S) Bns, Rifle Brigade, it now constituted 3rd (Light) Bde of the Light Division (as 2nd Division had been redesignated). The battalion settled down to peacetime training and sport. Lieutenant-Col W.W. Seymour arrived to command 53rd (S) Bn. On 15 May two companies moved out into a tented camp just outside the town, which was considered better accommodation than the linoleum factory. However, on 18 June the Light Division began moving to the Cologne area in case the German delegates rejected the Treaty of Versailles and Allied troops were ordered to occupy the Ruhr. On 21 June 53rd (S) Bn crossed the Rhine to Mülheim, where its picquets examined the passes of every German crossing into or out of the Occupied, zone, The battalion also guarded a former chemical weapons factory at Leverkusen, and a bulk petrol storage depot, where everyone had to be searched for matches and tobacco. The treaty was signed on 28 June and no advance beyond the Rhine was required. The Light Division began closing down in October and 53rd (S) Bn was finally disbanded on 25 October 1919.

=== Postwar ===
The SR resumed its old title of Militia in 1921 but like most militia units the 6th KRRC remained in abeyance after World War I. By the outbreak of World War II in 1939, no officers remained listed for the 6th Bn. The Militia was formally disbanded in April 1953.

== Heritage and ceremonial ==
=== Uniforms and insignia ===
When they were embodied in 1778 all the regiments of the Middlesex Militia had blue facings (usually associated with 'Royal' regiments), long before the 'Royal' title was conferred in 1804. When it became a rifle regiment in 1853 the West Middlesex adopted a Rifle green uniform with red facings, similar to that of the 60th Rifles.

About 1820 the officers' silver buttons had the letters 'W.M.M' (for West Middlesex Militia) below a crown, above which was the word 'Royal'. On becoming rifles the buttons changed to black, with a relief design of a crown and light infantry bugle-horn within a circle inscribed 'Royal Middlesex Rifles'. Once the regiment became part of the KRRC it adopted that regiment's insignia.

=== Precedence ===
During the War of American Independence the counties were given an order of precedence determined by ballot each year. For the Middlesex Militia the positions were:

- 6th on 1 June 1778
- 28th on 12 May 1779
- 7th on 6 May 1780
- 30th on 28 April 1781
- 14th on 7 May 1782

The order balloted for at the start of the French Revolutionary War in 1793 remained in force throughout the war. Middlesex's precedence of 22nd applied to all three regiments. Another ballot for precedence took place at the start of the Napoleonic War: Middlesex was 20th.

The militia order of precedence for the Napoleonic War remained in force until 1833. In that year the King drew the lots for individual regiments and the resulting list remained in force with minor amendments until the end of the militia. The regiments raised before the peace of 1763 took the first 47 places but the three Middlesex regiments raised in 1760 were included in the second group (1763–83), presumably because they were not actually embodied until 1778. The Royal West Middlesex Militia became 58th. The 2nd Royal West Middlesex seems to have been treated as a new unit after its split to form the 4th and found its number changed to 63rd (replacing the Isle of Wight Militia, converted to Militia Artillery). The regimental number was only a subsidiary title and most regiments paid little attention to it.

=== Colonels ===
The following were among those who served as Colonel of the Regiment or as its Honorary Colonel:

Colonels

- Colonel Cook, 1778
- Col Nicholas Bayly, appointed 15 April 1788, died 1812
- Col Sir John Gibbons, 4th Baronet, appointed 11 July 1831, died 1844
- Col Viscount Enfield (later 2nd Earl of Strafford), promoted on 29 April 1844

Honorary Colonels

- George Byng, 2nd Earl of Strafford, appointed 5 December 1859
- George Byng, Viscount Enfield, appointed 21 September 1871
- Hon Henry Byng, former Lt-Col in the Coldstream Guards, appointed 15 June 1878
- Lt-Col Godfrey Astell, appointed 27 April 1898
- Lt-Gen Sir Edward Hutton, KCB, KCMG, appointed 16 November 1901, reappointed to SR 28 June 1908

== See also ==
- Middlesex Militia
- Royal East Middlesex Militia
- Royal Westminster Militia
- Royal South Middlesex Militia
- Royal Elthorne Light Infantry Militia
- King's Royal Rifle Corps
- Militia (United Kingdom)
- Special Reserve
