= Black Week =

Successive British defeats in the second Boer War

Black Week refers to the week of Sunday 10 December – Sunday 17 December 1899 during the Second Boer War, when the British Army suffered three devastating defeats by the Boer Republics at the battles of Stormberg on Sunday 10 December, Magersfontein on Monday 11 December and Colenso on Friday 15 December 1899. In total, 2,776 British soldiers were killed, wounded and captured during this period.

The events were an eye opener for the government and troops, who had thought that the war could be won very easily. British units were armed with then-modern magazine-fed small arms, the .303 caliber Lee–Enfield and Lee–Metford, and breech-loading field artillery. Boers were armed with the 7mm 1893 Mauser rifle, and fielded German-built breech-loading field artillery. The British, however, were accustomed to fighting tribal wars with tactics more suited to the Napoleonic era, and had no tactical doctrine in place to fight against a foe also armed with the same modern weapons, and suffered accordingly.

With new, modernized troops came new tactics; only a few months after Black Week, one of the main British cavalry divisions led a flanking march that ended with a victory. Besides equipping the cavalry with rapid-firing rifles instead of lances, the new British military doctrine also started using artillery as a defensive unit of the army, and saw innovation in the use of machine guns.

These new volunteers served as a "new face, untainted by defeat and accusations of defeatism…to breathe life back into the campaigns and restore hope at home." Other changes enacted by the British immediately following the Black Week disaster were the mobilization of two more divisions, the calling up of the army reserves, raising a force of mounted infantry for better mobility, and most importantly by sending volunteers from home overseas which added more than one hundred thousand additional troops by the end of the war.

"The week which extended from December 10th to December 17th, 1899, was the blackest one known during our generation, and the most disastrous for British arms during the century. We had in the short space of seven days lost, beyond all extenuation or excuse, three separate actions. No single defeat was of vital importance in itself, but the cumulative effect, occurring as they did to each of the main British forces in South Africa, was very great. The total loss amounted to about three thousand men and twelve guns, while the indirect effects in the way of loss of prestige to ourselves and increased confidence and more numerous recruits to our enemy were incalculable."

— Arthur Conan Doyle, The Great Boer War, Chapter 12 - The Dark Hour

== Political situation ==
During Black Week, the British War Office assumed the leading role while the Colonial Secretary Joseph Chamberlain stepped back in the cabinet and the Boer War raged on. The reverses and humiliations for the Army hit the London government hard. Chamberlain was eclipsed in Cabinet during December 1899. Ironically Chamberlain had initially been offered the War Office by Lord Salisbury when the government was formed in 1895; had he accepted he would have been at the War Office dealing with the difficulties in the Cape.

Arthur Balfour was acting Prime Minister, and Lord Lansdowne, Secretary for War. Lord Salisbury, grieving at Hatfield for his dead wife, was incapacitated. After Lord Roberts' victories in the first half of 1900 Chamberlain came to be hailed as a great statesman, in part filling the gap left by the gradual retirement of Lord Salisbury, the former titan of foreign policy. Chamberlain wanted a tolerant, liberal, civilized Empire, and a generous reconstruction of South Africa.

== Military situations ==
Lord Methuen was on the march to Kimberley, only 25 miles away. Unscreened from the Boer's trenches in the town, the mounted force lost 500 men. But they managed to wheel round to cross the Modder River by nightfall. There he rested from 1 to 7 December, using the river for refreshment. They fully expected Redvers Buller to simultaneously march on Ladysmith in north Natal. These blows they hoped would end the war by Christmas. By Lord Milner's assessment conveyed to London, 70,000 troops would be needed to complete the business. Milner's concern over losses mitigating success on the field had caused a rethink of the situation in the Transvaal.

...If we had known all we do now, I suppose that we should have taken up a position probably at Colenso and left all the northern part of Natal undefended. We ought also probably to have abandoned Mafeking.

One serious deficiency was the low velocity artillery which shot less far than the Boers' excellent guns.

Milner wrote:.

I dare not speculate on the further progress of the war. The Boers seem to have fought with the greatest courage and determination, and I do not gather that they have lost their power as marksmen.

On Monday 11 December, General Gatacre's night attack into strong Boer defences at Stormberg had ended in failure. The enemy had modern rifles, accurate artillery, bandoliers for all, and proven horse commandos. Gatacre lost two guns, and 700 men, of whom 500 were prisoners. The senior officers had left them behind. But as usual the Boers did not bother to pursue.

On the Modder River, Methuen's division of 15,000 frontline troops ran into heavily dug-in Boers on the Magersfontein Heights. The British artillery barrage warned the Boer of the impending assault, led by the Highland Brigade in the monsoon rains in the darkness. At dawn the British were caught by a murderous cross-fire. Major-General Wauchope became a high-ranking casualty. The British casualties were 1000 men to the Boers' 250. The defeat delayed the relief of Kimberley.

In Natal, Buller was already pessimistic about the coming battle, although in England they only knew his great reputation. On Friday, December 15, he tried to cross the river. A sortie from Ladysmith might have taken the Boer pickets on Hlangwane Hill, but its significance was overlooked. The British lost 1100 men and ten artillery guns. A humiliating retreat was ordered at nightfall although half the army had not yet engaged the enemy. Lord Roberts' son was killed. Buller, at his wits end, advised Ladysmith to surrender, but Sir George White pledged to fight on.

Liberal leader Henry Campbell-Bannerman declared from Aberdeen on December 19,

The gravity of the situation, the formidable character of the campaign as now disclosed ...these furnish no ground for doubt or for despondency.... We have a united people in this country, and in every part of the Empire, and with these forces on our side moral and material success is certain.... Mr Chamberlain is largely responsible for this war.

== Consequences of the defeats ==
The British government drastically changed their mindset after the Black Week disaster to the realization that the Boer war would not be an easy victory or won by Christmas. They undertook many changes in the military including military personnel, better mobilization, and better modernization in order to match and then surpass the Boer troops. Many different opinions arose in the United Kingdom. Although there were many doubters who criticized the overall justice of the British cause, the patriots who would end up volunteering, fighting, and winning this conflict were the majority. Following Black Week, the government called "for able-bodied men willing to abandon their homes and families and risk their lives to serve their country." Even with this dangerous task, many still volunteered either for the regular army or for shorter enlistments.

Buller's decisions at Ladysmith caused him to be sacked and replaced with Lord Roberts. It was the end of a career for the man the press dubbed "Sir Reverse" Buller.

Another consequence was the recruitment within months of 30,863 new troops from Canada, Australia and New Zealand. These were ordered by the Imperial Conference held in 1902. 8400 Canadians volunteered, of which 600 Horse were raised by Lord Strathcona in British Columbia.

Of the Australians, 6208 came from New South Wales, 3897 from Victoria, 2903 from Queensland, 1494 from South Australia, 1165 from Western Australia, 796 from Tasmania. About 6000 from New Zealand. The Canadians were eager horsemen, and when the matter was settled on the day after Colenso, the necessity of cavalry doctrine was acknowledged. Since Black Week large numbers of Australians were encamped awaiting departure. The day after Buller's defeat Premier of New Zealand Richard Seddon telegrammed Chamberlain declaring how they would be delighted to help.
