= Royal London Militia =

Auxiliary unit of the British Army

Royal London Militia 7th Bn Royal Fusiliers
- The arms of the City of London
- Active: 1794–April 1953
- Country: Great Britain; United Kingdom
- Branch: Militia/Special Reserve
- Role: Infantry
- Size: 1–2 Regiments
- Part of: 63rd (Royal Naval) Division
- Garrison/HQ: Finsbury Barracks
- Engagements: Battle of the Ancre (1916); Battle of Arras; Second Battle of Passchendaele; Welsh Ridge; Battle of the Ancre (1918); Battle of Albert; Battle of the Canal du Nord; Second Battle of Cambrai

Commanders
- Notable commanders: Brig-Gen Sir George Cockerill

The Royal London Militia was an auxiliary (Note: It is incorrect to describe the British Militia as 'irregular': throughout their history they were equipped and trained exactly like the line regiments of the regular army, and once embodied in time of war they were fulltime professional soldiers for the duration of their enlistment.) regiment organised in the City of London during the French Revolutionary Wars from the former London Trained Bands. It later became part of the Royal Fusiliers (City of London Regiment). After conversion to the Special Reserve (SR) under the Haldane Reforms it was one of just a handful of SR units to see combat during World War I, fighting in many actions on the Western Front from 1916 until the Armistice in 1918. After a shadowy postwar existence the unit was finally disbanded in 1953.

== Background ==
The universal obligation to military service in the shire levy was long established in England and its legal basis was updated by the Military Service Act 1557 (4 & 5 Ph. & M. c. 2) and the Military Service (No. 2) Act 1557 (4 & 5 Ph. & M. c. 3), which placed selected men, the 'trained bands', under the command of lord -lieutenants appointed by the monarch (in the City of London the lieutenancy was exercised by commissioners headed by the Lord Mayor). While trained bands of the counties most threatened by invasion were given professional captains for training, the large and efficient force of London Trained Bands (LTBs) was drilled by its own officers, many of whom had learned the necessary skills as members of the Honourable Artillery Company (HAC). The LTBs were an important element in the army mustered at Tilbury at the time of the Armada. During the English Civil War the six city regiments were joined by six auxiliary regiments, together with three regiments and their auxiliaries from the suburbs (the Liberties). This part-time force constituted Parliament's strategic reserve during the early years of the war, ensuring that the city's extensive fortifications were fully manned, and also providing brigades to reinforce the field armies for specific operations. The English Militia was re-established under local control in 1662 after the Restoration of the monarchy, but the LTBs remained a separate body, under their old title.

== Royal London Militia ==
The London Trained Bands, with their own act of Parliament, remained outside many of the reforms of the militia system over the next century, although they were still a useful force for putting down civil unrest (for example during the Gordon Riots of 1780). When the City militia were finally reorganised in 1794 the traditional six regiments were reduced to two, the East London Militia and the West London Militia under the Commissioners of Lieutenancy for the city. Unlike most county militia regiments which could be 'embodied' for permanent service anywhere in the country, one of the London regiments had to remain in the city at all times and the other could not legally be employed more than 12 miles away. Both regiments were awarded the prefix 'Royal' in 1804.

In the summer of 1805, with Napoleon's 'Army of England' assembling at Boulogne, the Royal West London Militia, 579 men in eight companies under Lt-Col Edward Wigan, were camped on Clapham Common. Together with the 2nd Tower Hamlets Militia at Mile End, they formed an infantry brigade under the command of Maj-Gen Thomas Grosvenor. Meanwhile the Royal East London, with 588 men under Lt-Col John Thacker Jennings, were distributed with seven companies at Greenwich, one at Woolwich and one at Lewisham. Together with the 1st Tower Hamlets at Deptford, they formed the militia elements in Maj-Gen Sir George James Ludlow's brigade.

The two regiments were amalgamated as the Royal London Militia in 1820, under its own act of Parliament, the Militia (City of London) Act 1820 (1 Geo. 4. c. 100).

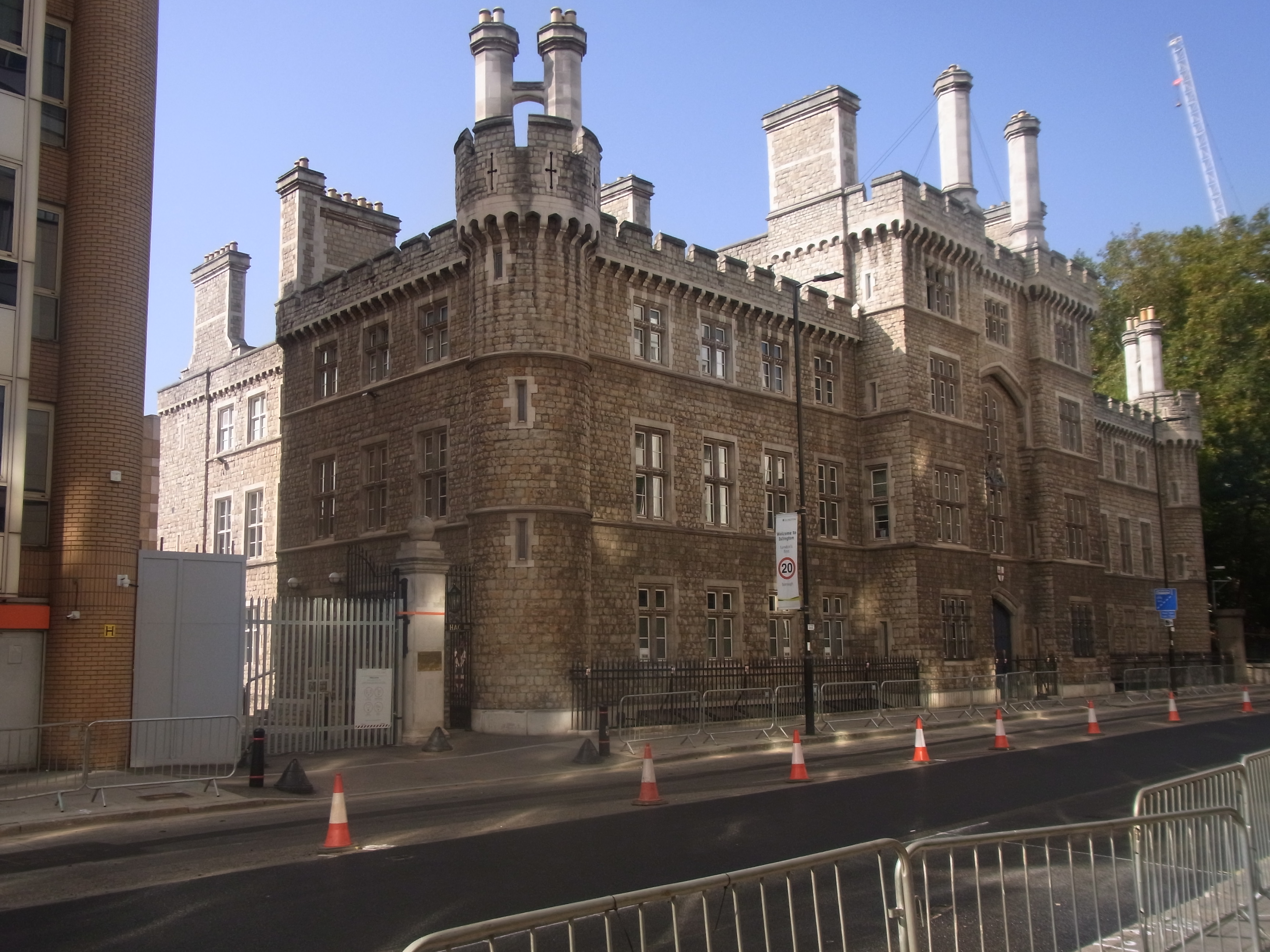
Finsbury Barracks.

After years of decline following the Battle of Waterloo, the Militia of the United Kingdom was revived by the Militia Act 1852, enacted during a period of international tension. As before, units were raised and administered on a county basis, and filled by voluntary enlistment. Training was for 56 days on enlistment, then for 21–28 days per year, during which the men received full army pay. Under the act, militia units could be embodied by royal proclamation for full-time home defence service in three circumstances:

1. 'Whenever a state of war exists between Her Majesty and any foreign power'.
2. 'In all cases of invasion or upon imminent danger thereof'.
3. 'In all cases of rebellion or insurrection'.

Now, rather than being drawn from city merchants and the HAC, many of the Royal London regiment's officers were retired from the regular army, including a number of members of the exclusive Gentlemen at Arms.

The Royal London Militia was embodied for full-time duty from 20 February 1855 during the Crimean War. In 1856 the regiment was at the new North Camp at Aldershot, where the huts had only just been finished and the camp was a sea of mud. At Aldershot the regiment was in the 6th London Brigade for training, alongside the 2nd Royal Surrey, 1st Somerset and Cavan militia regiments. Peace having been signed, the militia dispersed from camp and the Royal Londons were disembodied on 12 June 1856.

The Commission of Lieutenancy for the City built Finsbury Barracks for the Royal London Militia on a site adjacent to the HAC's headquarters at Armoury House. The building was designed by Joseph Jennings and was completed in 1857.

Militia battalions now had a large cadre of permanent staff (about 30). Around a third of the recruits and many young officers went on to join the Regular Army. The Militia Reserve introduced in 1867 consisted of present and former militiamen who undertook to serve overseas in case of war.

In 1871 a number of militia regiments combined their annual training with the Autumn Manoeuvres at Aldershot. The Royal Londons were included in 1st Brigade along with the 1st Royal East Middlesex, 2nd (Edmonton Rifles) Middlesex and 2nd Royal Tower Hamlets militia regiments. The regiments marched and camped around Sandhurst, Frensham and Chobham and took part in divisional 'sham fights'.

Under the 'Localisation of the Forces' scheme introduced by the Cardwell Reforms of 1872, militia regiments were grouped into county brigades with Regular battalions and their local Rifle Volunteer Corps – for the Royal Londons this was in Brigade Nos 51 and 52 with the 60th Rifles and the 2nd Middlesex Militia. This was not particularly convenient, when the regimental depot for the Rifles was in Winchester. These were purely administrative arrangements, but a mobilisation scheme began to appear in the Army List from December 1875. This assigned Regular and Militia units to places in an order of battle of corps, divisions and brigades for the 'Active Army', even though these formations were entirely theoretical, with no staff or services assigned. The Royal London Militia were assigned to 1st Brigade of 3rd Division, III Corps. The brigade, consisting of three Irish Militia regiments as well as the Royal Londons, would have mustered at Tunbridge Wells in time of war.

== 4th (Royal London Militia) Battalion, Royal Fusiliers ==
The Childers Reforms of 1881 took Cardwell's reforms further, formally turning the militia regiments into battalions of their linked regular regiments. However, while the 2nd Middlesex remained with the 60th Rifles, the Royal Londons were transferred to the more convenient Royal Fusiliers (City of London Regiment). Consequently, the regiment became the 4th (Royal London Militia) Battalion, Royal Fusiliers, on 1 July 1881. When the Royal Fusiliers raised two additional regular battalions in 1898, the Royal Londons became the 6th Battalion.

The battalion was embodied from 1 May to 18 October 1900 during the Second Boer War, but did not serve overseas.

== 7th (Extra Reserve) Battalion, Royal Fusiliers ==
After the Boer War, the future of the militia was called into question. There were moves to reform the Auxiliary Forces (Militia, Yeomanry and Volunteers) to take their place in the six Army Corps proposed by the Secretary of State for War, St John Brodrick. However, little of Brodrick's scheme was carried out. Under the more sweeping Haldane Reforms of 1908, the Militia was replaced by the Special Reserve (SR), a semi-professional force whose wartime role was to provide reinforcement drafts for regular units serving overseas, rather like the earlier Militia Reserve. The battalion became the 7th (Extra Reserve) Battalion, Royal Fusiliers, on 28 June 1908.

=== World War I ===
On the outbreak of war on 4 August 1914 the battalion mobilised at Artillery Place and the men reported daily to Finsbury Barracks until 8 August when a 100-strong party marched to Guildhall to hand over the colours to the Lord Mayor for safekeeping. The battalion then entrained with a strength of 18 officers and 750 other ranks (ORs) under the command of Lt-Col George Cockerill (CO since 30 March) for its war station at Falmouth, Cornwall. Here it carried out the dual tasks of garrison duty and preparing reinforcement drafts of regular reservists, special reservists, recruits and returning wounded for the regular battalions serving overseas. It formed 16th (Reserve) Battalion, Royal Fusiliers, at Falmouth from Kitchener's Army volunteers in October 1914 (see below). During this period Lt-Col Cockerill was transferred to a post in Military Intelligence and Maj R.S.I. Hesketh was promoted to take over command.

In July 1916 the battalion was sent to France (Note: The 7th (Extra Reserve) Battalion was one of only a few SR battalions that was employed for combat during World War I, probably because the Royal Fusiliers had three SR battalions supporting four regular battalions instead of the usual 1:2 ratio.) to join the British Expeditionary Force (BEF) on the Western Front, landing at Le Havre on 24 July. Three days later (together with the infantry battalion of the HAC and the 1st Artists Rifles of the Territorial Force, and the 4th (Extra Reserve) Battalion, Bedfordshire Regiment, another SR battalion) it joined 190th Brigade in 63rd (Royal Naval) Division. The Royal Naval Division had been formed from surplus Royal Navy (RN) reservists and Royal Marines (RM) on the outbreak of war and had taken part in the Defence of Antwerp and the Gallipoli campaign. In April 1916 the division was transferred to the War Office, taking the number of a disbanded 63rd Division, and was transported to the Western Front, where it was reorganised with one army brigade (190th) and two RN/RM brigades.

==== Ancre ====
63rd (Royal Naval) Division's insignia

The reformed division, both veteran units and newly joined ones such as the SR battalions, had been thoroughly trained for operations on the Western Front, and its first offensive operation, the Battle of the Ancre was meticulously planned. The attack was launched at 05.45 on 13 November behind a Creeping barrage. 7th Royal Fusiliers (7th RF) were in support behind 189th Bde, which successfully overran the German front system of trenches. Thereafter confusion set in, with troops attempting to move onto the next objectives through fog, shellholes and waterlogged communication trenches. By 06.30 the results were patchy: some parties were in the German support and reserve lines, in other places the front line had not been secured. 190th Brigade was now ordered forward, but 7th RF was held up by fire in the German front line. Disorganised attempts to get forward to the first or even second objectives went on all day, at the end of which a mixed force of 63rd (RN) Division was just short of the second objective in front of Beaucourt-sur-l'Ancre, and part of 7th RF was on the first objective, but by then it was too dark to reorganise. Next morning the barrage was renewed at 06.20, but only about 80 men of 7th RF were in position to take part in the attack, which captured Beaucourt. A protective field gun barrage deterred German counter-attacks, and 63rd (RN) Division was relieved on the morning of 15 November. 7th Royal Fusiliers had gone into action with 22 officers and 629 ORs; they lost 13 officers and 331 ORs.

63rd (RN) Division was back in action on the Ancre Heights in January and February 1917, including the Actions of Miraumont (17–18 February), but 190th Bde did not take part in the attacks. On 23 February the Germans began their withdrawal to the Hindenburg Line (Operation Alberich). Patrols from 7th RF discovered this next day, and pushed forward fighting patrols. On the morning of 25 February the battalion advanced nearly 2 miles (3.2 km) in 'artillery formation' (open order) as 63rd (RN) Division followed up through Miraumont until it was relieved by a fresher division later in the day.

==== Arras ====
The division went back into the line for the Arras Offensive. It stood fast on the opening day, and was in reserve thereafter, until it was committed to the attack on 23 April (the Second Battle of the Scarpe). The assembly trenches the battalion dug 200 yards (180 m) from the German positions were destroyed by shellfire and a new line had to be dug during the night of 21/22 April. Its objective was the village of Gavrelle, but despite lavish artillery support it found that the barbed wire had not been cut sufficiently. The hold-up to 7th RF exposed the left flank of 190th Bde, which the battalion had been assigned to protect. However, the division did succeed in capturing Gavrelle and holding it against fierce counter-attacks. Casualties to 7th RF had again been heavy.

For the next attack (the Battle of Arleux) the battered 7th RF formed a composite battalion with the 4th Bedfords. The attack by 188th Bde and 1st HAC on 28 April failed, and for its renewal next day the only reinforcement available was the composite battalion: 1st HAC and this battalion recaptured a strongpoint won and lost the previous day, and then 'bombed' their way forward through the German defences to get in touch with 22nd (Kensington) Bn Royal Fusiliers of 2nd Division. 2nd Division was able to 'dribble' some reinforcements from 23rd (1st Sportsman's) Bn Royal Fusiliers up to help, and together the mixed parties then worked their way up to within 200 yards (180 m) of Oppy Wood. Later the much-reduced 63rd (RN) Division was relieved, but fighting continued at Oppy Wood for another two months.

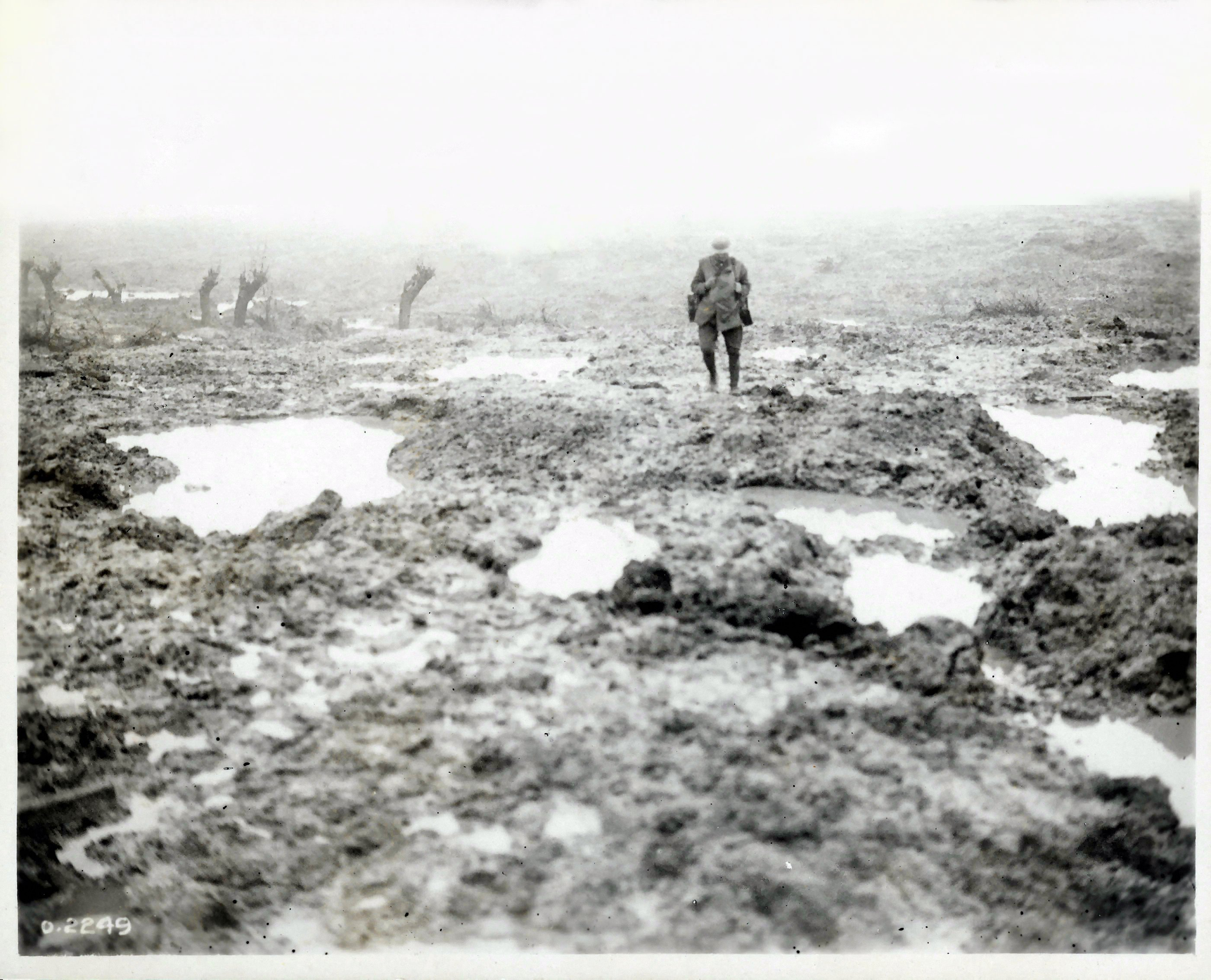
The mud of Passchendaele.

==== Winter 1917–18 ====
The division remained in the now-quiet Oppy Wood sector from July to September and was not committed to the offensive again until the final stages of the Third Ypres Offensive, the Second Battle of Passchendaele. On 26 October the division tried to advance up the valley of the Lekkerboterbeek, but the mud was knee-deep and the advance proceeded at a pace of less than a yard per minute, falling far behind the creeping barrage, and with rifles clogged with mud. The men fell back to their starting position if they could. On 30 October they tried again, this time on higher ground above the Lekkerboterbeek, but the mud was still knee-deep, the men lost the barrage, and were caught by the enemy artillery, casualties being particularly heavy in 190th Bde. All attempts to get forward failed and men lay out in the mud all day and the next night under fire from an uncaptured pillbox until a final failed attack on 07.45 on 31 October. The battalion was relieved that night

After the Ypres operation the CO, Lt-Col Playfair, was sent to hospital and Maj E.G.L'Estrange Malone took command. After resting and refitting, the 63rd (RN) Division moved south and by 21 December was holding the front line on Welsh Ridge, where the German counter-attack after the Battle of Cambrai had been halted. The battalion was ordered to capture a prisoner for identification purposes; it was a bright moonlit night with frost on the ground so any movement in No man's land was likely to be seen. The raid sent out under Lance-Corporal Norris spotted an enemy patrol on the same mission, and lured it towards a standing patrol of the 7th RF, which captured one of the Germans, securing the identification only three and a half hours after the order arrived. Lance-Corporal Norris was awarded the Military Medal (MM).

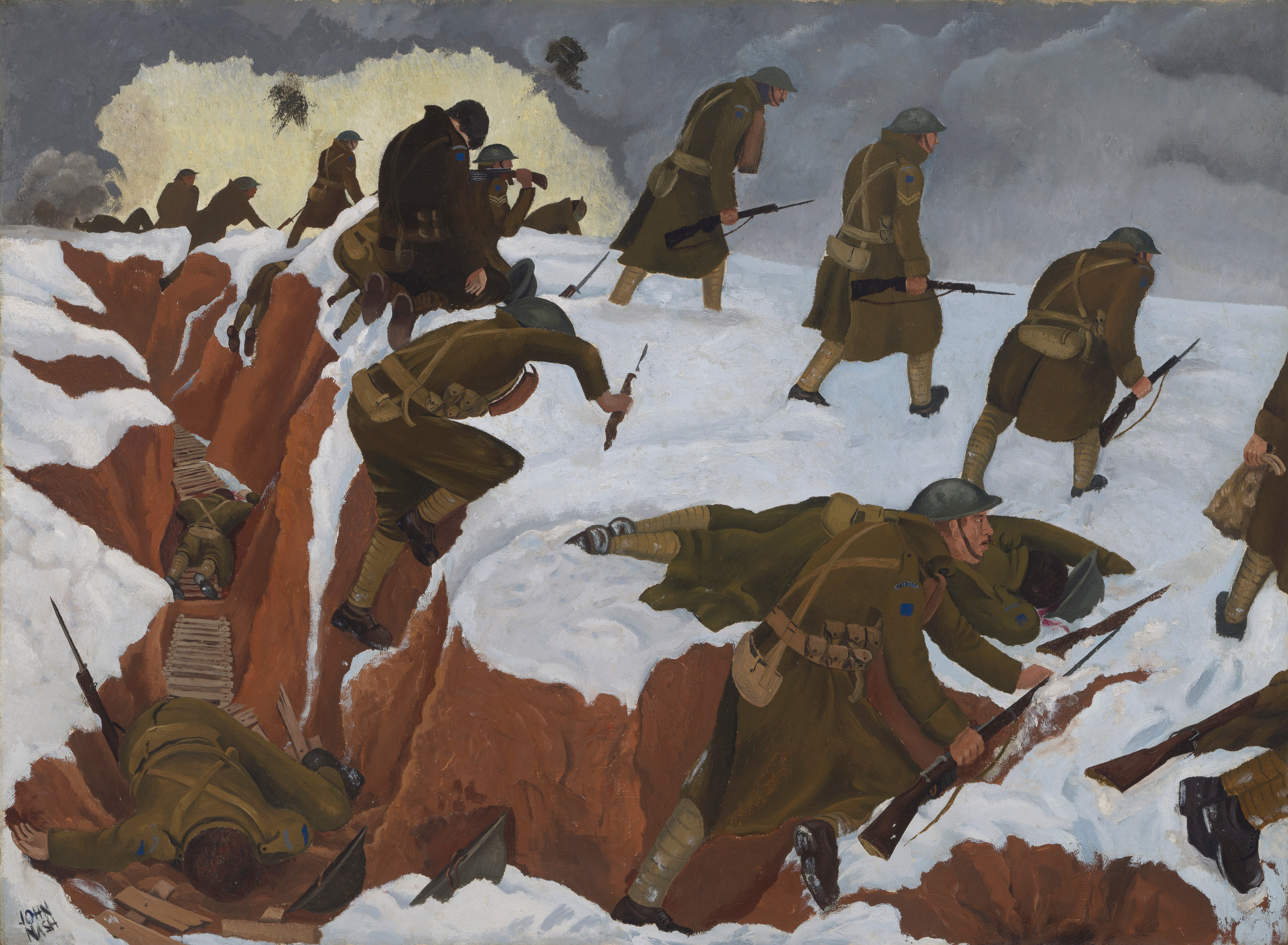
Over the Top, the Artists Rifles in 190th Bde's attack at Welsh Ridge, 30 December 1917, by John Nash, who participated in the attack as a sergeant.

On the night of 29/30 December, with snow on the ground, the Germans heavily shelled the division's supporting artillery with Mustard gas, then at 06.30 began an intense bombardment of the front line, smashing trenches, dugouts and dumps. Fifteen minutes later the German infantry attacked in snow camouflage and employing flamethrower detachments. The British artillery, machine guns and rifles took a heavy toll of them, but in places they broke into the British forward outposts in the old Hindenburg Line. 7th Royal Fusiliers were pushed out of Eagle Trench, with many of the outposts captured, because there were no communication trenches back from the old German trenches and the ground behind was still covered by the old German wire. The Medical Officer and Regimental Aid Post were among those captured. A counter-attack by the brigade reserve recovered most of the ground at noon. A second attack next day made no headway. Casualties were heavy on both sides, with 7th RF losing 9 officers and 244 ORs; the battalion's 'trench strength' was now only 11 officers and 167 ORs. The battalion was temporarily amalgamated with the 1st Artists Rifles.

==== Spring 1918 ====
When the German spring offensive (Operation Michael) was launched on 21 March 1918, 63rd (RN) Division was occupying part of the Flesquières Salient, the last remaining gain from the Battle of Cambrai. This was recognised as being vulnerable, so was only held by the outpost line, the main battle zone being a shorter line further back. The Germans steadily shelled the salient with mustard gas between 10 and 16 March, possibly hoping that the British would withdraw from it anyway; by the time it was relieved 7th RF had about 250 men evacuated to hospital, but it had to go back into the line on 20/21 March. The battalion received a draft of over 100 reinforcements at 01.00 on 21 March: after a three-day journey in lorries they were sent straight up into the line in the dark, never having been in a trench before.

The German bombardment began at 04.00 on 21 March and the infantry attacked out of the morning fog. B Company of 7th RF beat off the attack to their front but found their left flank uncovered where the Germans had got into the trenches of the neighbouring battalion and they had to withdraw, with their company commander killed. C Company came up to counter-attack, finding men from both flanking battalions mixed up in the Royal Fusiliers' trenches. A Company counter-attacked to retake the trenches to the right. Having stabilised their front the battalion held on all day, but were ordered to begin withdrawing from the salient at 01.00 on 22 March, destroying the heavy equipment before leaving. The battalion withdrew along a duckboard track under artillery fire; about 11.00 the British artillery opened up and stopped the Germans from following up further. The division now held the old British front line. However, the retirement was resumed at 20.00 that evening.

The battalion went back through Trescault to the Metz Switch trench at the southern edge of Havrincourt Wood. This was part of the British 'Green Line', but the trenches were barely started, being only 2 feet (0.61 m) deep, with no dugouts and no field of fire, though there were some huts in Léchelle. At this point the 1st Artists Rifles and the 4th Bedfords were holding a line east of Ytres, with 7th RF in support. The position rapidly grew critical, with heavy shellfire driving the men out of the huts. Gaps were opening along Third Army's line as neighbouring divisions fell back, and without further withdrawal 63rd (RN) Division's frontline troops were in danger of being cut off. 7th Royal Fusiliers had to fall back over the open to the Rocquigny–Bus road under Shrapnel shell and machine gun fire. By the time the battalion arrived, Lt-Col Malone and the second-in-command had both been evacuated to hospital so it was commanded by Capt J. Forster, who rallied the scattered men with a hunting horn. At 19.00 7th RF was ordered to fill the gap between 190th Bde and 47th (1/2nd London) Division, but the gap was too wide and the Germans were already in Bus.

The nearby ammunition dumps and stores had been set alight and blazed all night. At dawn on 24 March 7th RF was covering the Rocquigny–Bus road and held up the enemy's advance for a time while Rocquigny was heavily bombarded. At 08.00 the battalion fell back on Le Transloy, where the men were congratulated by the divisional commander on their fine work. But in a few hours the enemy pressure on their position was such that the battalion was ordered to fall back once more. It retired over the old Somme battlefields through Flers and High Wood to Bazentin le Petit, acting as the division's flank guard. The battalion reached Bazentin at 18.00 after several encounters with the enemy and was ordered into divisional reserve, spending the night in the open in a chalk quarry at Courcelette.

At noon next day (25 March) the battalion took up position on the ridge covering Courcelette as the troops in front were forced back. Thinking that the British were on the run, the Germans attacked in masses and were shot down in large numbers on the slopes, but with both flanks 'in the air' 7th RF was forced to withdraw slowly towards Thiepval at 14.00, covered by a rearguard as the Germans pressed on both flanks. Many of the men were cut off as the engagement became general. By 20.00 the battalion was in old German positions along the Thiepval ridge, where 63rd Division was covering the Ancre crossings, and it held this position until 04.00 on 26 March. It then crossed the river, 7th RF using Authuile bridge, and held the eastern edge of Aveluy Wood. From this high ground they watched the Germans moving towards Aveluy at 08.00, when the bridges were blown. An hour later the battalion was relieved and withdrew though the wood to Martinsart and Englebelmer.

During the day the Germans had occupied Albert, and that night they began advancing out of the town. 190th Brigade was alerted to counter-attack at 03.00 on 27 March, for which 7th RF was in support. The German advance was halted and the battalion remained on the Bouzincourt–Aveluy. line. Later the Germans secured a foothold in Aveluy Wood but were halted when 190th Bde was brought up again. By now the brigade was too weak to counter-attack, and the fighting died down.

Although completely exhausted, 63rd (RN) Division, remained close to the line in reserve while drafts of reinforcements began to arrive. While this process was still going on, 7th RF went back into the front line near Mesnil on 3 April, under the command of acting-Major P.L.E. Walker of the 7th Hussars. The final phase of Operation Michael (the Battle of the Ancre) came on 5 April. The German preliminary bombardment cut all communications and most of the officers were casualties. German infantry got round both flanks and were firing into the battalion from the rear. With many of the men overwhelmed the whole brigade was forced back after hand-to-hand fighting in the afternoon. At 04.30 next day 7th RF was still out of touch with the 4th Bedfords on the left until the adjutant filled the gap with a Lewis gun team. Early in the day Maj Walker and all the officers were casualties and a non-commissioned officer took over. The survivors joined a counter-attack by the Royal Marine Light Infantry that regained much of the lost ground at 07.45 and a position was consolidated by 14.00. The 7th RF was relieved at dusk, having lost 12 officers and 205 ORs in two days, but the Germans had made little progress.

==== Summer 1918 ====
63rd (RN) Division took no further part in the Spring fighting while its battalions were slowly brought back to strength. By July the division was in the Mailly area, and the reconstituted 7th RF was active in carrying out trench raids that progressively advanced the divisional front. On 4 July the battalion carried out a raid that did considerable damage to the German front line and took prisoners. Sergeant West with his prisoner got lost in No man's land, but he stuck to his prisoner and eventually brought him in through another part of the division's line; West was awarded the MM. On the night of 22/23 July 7th RF captured and occupied the enemy's forward posts.

==== Hundred Days Offensive ====
The Allies launched their Hundred Days Offensive on 8 August and 63rd (RN) Division joined in at the Battle of Albert on 21 August. Zero hour was 04.55, and the leading formations found themselves attacking through a thick fog; by the time 63rd (RN) Division's leading brigades passed through the fog was thickened by smoke and the advance became confused. The attack was held up, and when 7th RF with 190th Bde passed through in turn it took them until after dark to consolidate positions alongside Logeast Wood. The Germans counter-attacked next day and shortly after 12.00 they pushed into a gap between 63rd (RN) and 3rd Divisions, turning 7th RF's position. There was a fierce struggle before the ground was recovered. The day was hot and the battalion was suffering from lack of water and ammunition. Arrangements to air-drop ammunition to the forward positions did not work well – it fell in No man's land and in the wood – and 7th RF had to borrow ammunition from 4th Bedfords until supplies were brought up at 18.00. The division was relieved that night

The supporting artillery having been brought up, 63rd (RN) Division renewed the attack on 26 August, attempting to capture Thilloy, Ligny Thilloy and Riencourt-lès-Bapaume, near Bapaume. The two attacking brigades were held up and in the renewed attack next day 7th RF advanced with the 4th Bedfords. The barrage at Zero (11.00) fell short, causing casualties among the troops assembled for the attack, which failed. In the afternoon another attack was delivered, and the troops penetrated into Thilloy. But the battalion was now seriously weakened, with particularly heavy losses among the officers. The leaderless survivors withdrew and the battalion was relieved after what the regimental history admits was 'a disastrous day'. 190th Brigade did not take part in the division's next few operations.

190th Brigade was back in the line for the Battle of the Canal du Nord on 27 September, when it crossed the canal after some stiff fighting, and then crossed the old Hindenburg support line. Here they were held up at about 08.00 and requested artillery support did not materialise, so the advance was halted until the rest of the division passed through. The advance continued over the next two days, across part of the Marcoing Line and the St Quentin Canal. At 06.30 on 30 September 7th RF put in an attack towards Cambrai from near Proville, but it was difficult ground and the battalion was held up by converging machine gun fire after advancing only 200 yards (180 m).

There was then a pause before the Battle of Cambrai was launched on 8 October. 63rd (RN) Division's objective was Niergnies, and 7th RF held its position while the attack went in. During the day the Germans counter-attacked using captured tanks, but the division recovered from its surprise and beat off the attacks: 7th RF only suffered three casualties.

63rd (RN) Division was then pulled out and sent north to join First Army. The advance was now turning into a pursuit, and the division's last action was the Passage of the Grande Honnelle on 7 November when the division pushed its way across the river. On 10 November the division secured the high ground beyond Harveng, south of Mons. 7th Battalion Royal Fusiliers was at Harveng when the Armistice with Germany came into effect next day. It was disembodied on 3 June 1919.

=== 16th (Reserve) Battalion ===
After Lord Kitchener issued his call for volunteers in August 1914, the battalions of the 1st, 2nd and 3rd New Armies ('K1', 'K2' and 'K3' of 'Kitchener's Army') were quickly formed at the regimental depots. The SR battalions also swelled with new recruits and were soon well above their establishment strength. On 8 October 1914 each SR battalion was ordered to use the surplus to form a service battalion of the 4th New Army ('K4'). Accordingly, the 7th (Extra Reserve) Bn at Falmouth formed the 16th (Service) Battalion of the Royal Fusiliers in October 1914. (Note: The War Office cancelled the order for most Extra Reserve battalions on 25 October, but 7th (ER) Bn Royal Fusiliers went ahead and formed 16th (S) Bn.) It trained for active service as part of 103rd Brigade in 34th Division. On 10 April 1915 the War Office decided to convert the K4 battalions into 2nd Reserve units, to provide drafts for the K1–K3 battalions in the same way that the SR was doing for the Regular battalions. The Royal Fusiliers battalion became 16th (Reserve) Battalion in 5th Reserve Brigade and moved with it to Purfleet in Essex in May 1915. It moved with the brigade to Shoreham-by-Sea in September 1915. On 1 September 1916 the 2nd Reserve battalions were transferred to the Training Reserve and 16th Royal Fusiliers absorbed the 9th (Reserve) Battalion, Queens Own (Royal West Kent Regiment) and was redesignated 22nd Training Reserve Bn, still in 5th Reserve Bde at Shoreham. The training staff retained their Royal Fusiliers badges. The battalion was redesignated again on 1 September 1917 as 285th (Infantry) Bn, Training Reserve. However, on 27 October that year it was transferred to the King's Royal Rifle Corps as 52nd (Graduated) Bn in 202nd Brigade of 67th Division at Canterbury, moving to Colchester in March 1918, remaining there for the rest of the war. On 8 February 1919 it was converted into a service battalion and joined the British Army of the Rhine, where it was absorbed into 18th (Service) Bn of the KRRC on 10 April.

=== Postwar ===
The SR resumed its old title of Militia in 1921 and then became the Supplementary Reserve in 1924, but almost all militia battalions remained in abeyance after World War I. They remained in the Army List, but by 1939 the 7th Royal Fusiliers had no officers listed. (Note: However, the Royal Fusiliers did have a number of Supplementary Reserve officers Category B attached to it.) The militia were not activated during World War II and were all formally disbanded in April 1953.

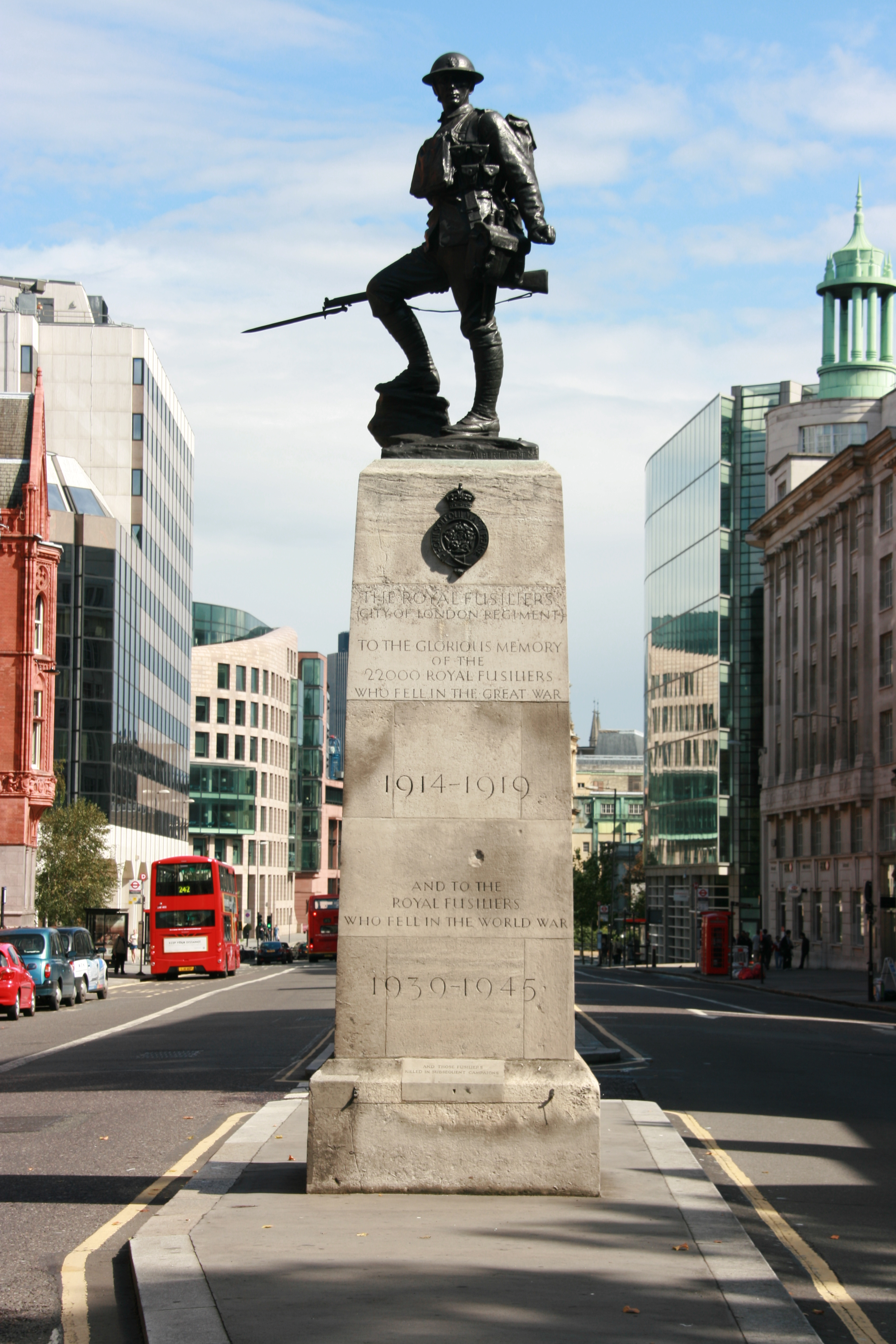
The Royal Fusiliers War Memorial.

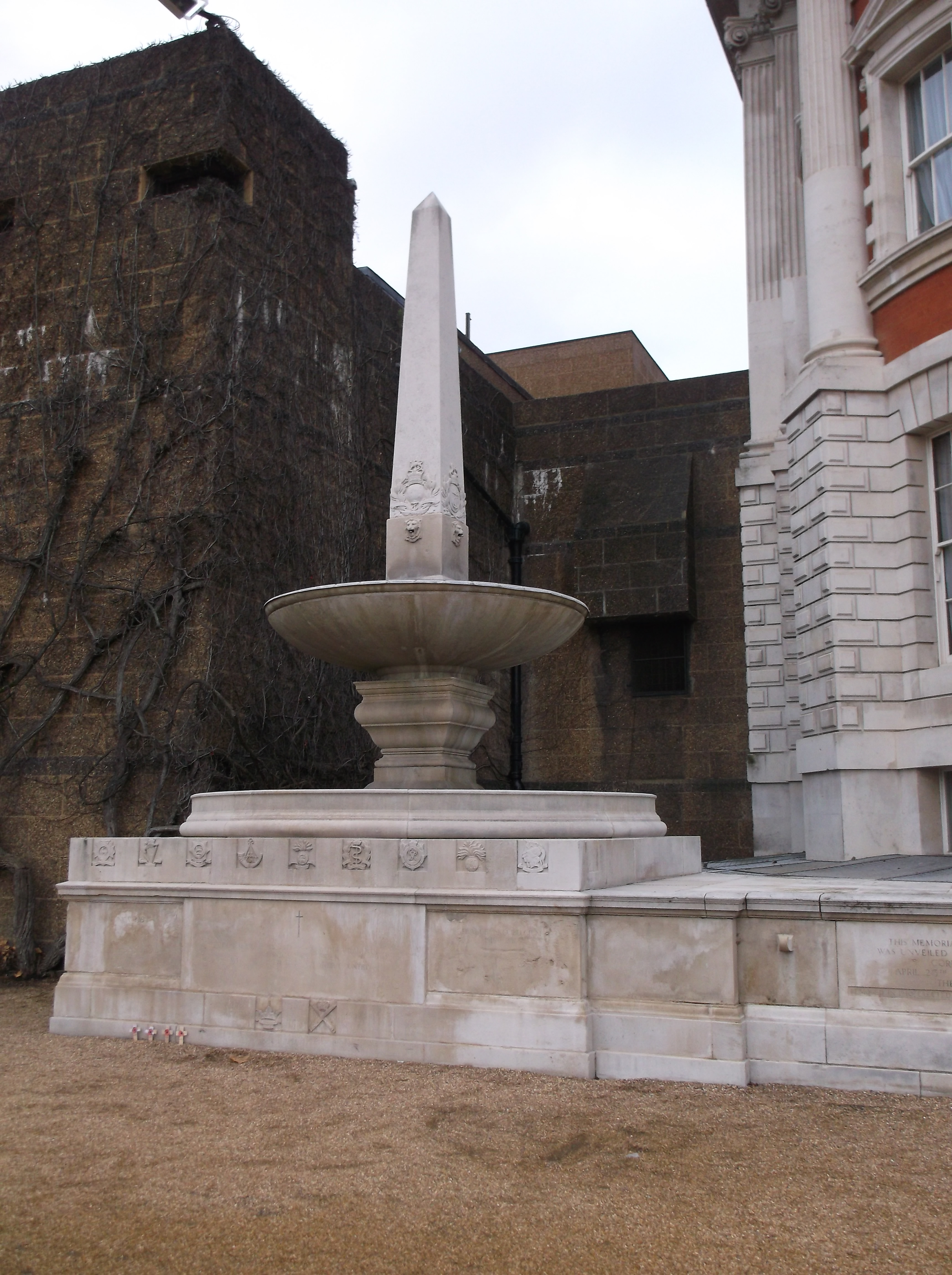
The Royal Naval Division Memorial.

== Memorials ==
The battalion's World War I dead are commemorated on the Royal Fusiliers War Memorial on High Holborn and on the Royal Naval Division War Memorial on Horse Guards Parade.

== Ceremonial ==
The City of London Militia Act 1794 (34 Geo. 3. c. 81) and the City of London Militia Act 1795 (35 Geo. 3. c. 27) that formed the East and West Regiments safeguarded the right of the former London Trained Bands to march through the city with colours flying, bands playing, and bayonets fixed. This privilege was also enjoyed by the 7th Royal Fusiliers.

=== Uniforms and insignia ===
The regiment's uniform was red with blue facings, usually associated with 'Royal' regiments, but which the London Militia had adopted at some stage in its history and was officially acknowledged in 1795, before the 'Royal' title was conferred in 1804.

The badge was the Coat of arms of the City of London, including the motto Domine dirige nos ('Lord direct us'). On the Shako (and later helmet) plates, and the officers' shoulder-belt plates, this badge was displayed within a wreath of oak leaves. The officers' Coatee (and later tunic) buttons displayed the arms on a shield within a crowned circle, the whole superimposed on a cut star. Once the regiment became part of the Royal Fusiliers it adopted that regiment's badge and insignia.

== Commanders ==
The following were among the commanders and senior officers of the regiment:

Honorary Colonel:

- Sir William Anderson Rose, former colonel, appointed 12 June 1880, died 9 June 1881
- Sir Reginald Hanson, 1st Baronet, appointed 21 October 1882, died 18 April 1905
- Sir Lorenzo G. Dundas, former colonel, appointed 29 May 1905, reappointed to 7th Bn 28 June 1908
- Robert H. Rudyerd-Helpman, former colonel, appointed 31 July 1909

Colonel:

- Col Sir Claudius Hunter, 1st Baronet, died 1851, former Lord Mayor
- Col William Thompson, former Lord Mayor
- Col Samuel Wilson, former Lord Mayor, appointed 24 March 1854
- Col Sir William Anderson Rose, former Lord Mayor, appointed 16 November 1870
- Col Lorenzo G. Dundas, promoted 5 January 1881
- Col Henry N.B. Good, promoted 29 November 1899
- Col Robert H. Helpman, promoted 2 January 1904

Lieutenant-Colonel:

- Lt-Col George McCall, formerly of the 84th Foot, appointed 21 March 1854
- Lt-Col John H. Allan, appointed 21 December 1870
- Lt-Col Lorenzo G. Dundas, formerly Captain, 62nd Foot, appointed 21 March 1877
- Lt-Col R.M. Borthwick, appointed 5 January 1881
- Lt-Col Henry N.B. Good, promoted 18 April 1896
- Lt-Col Francis L. Swan, retired captain, appointed 27 March 1900
- Lt-Col Robert H. Helpman, promoted
- Lt-Col Coote Hely-Hutchinson, promoted 17 September 1906
- Lt-Col George Cockerill, retired major, appointed 30 March 1914
- Lt-Col R.J.I. Hesketh, CBE, appointed 5 August 1914

== See also ==
- London Militia
- London Trained Bands
- Militia (United Kingdom)
- Royal Fusiliers

== Bibliography ==
- Maj R. Money Barnes, The Soldiers of London, London: Seeley Service, 1963.
- Maj A.F. Becke,History of the Great War: Order of Battle of Divisions, Part 2b: The 2nd-Line Territorial Force Divisions (57th–69th), with the Home-Service Divisions (71st–73rd) and 74th and 75th Divisions, London: HM Stationery Office, 1937/Uckfield: Naval & Military Press, 2007, ISBN 1-847347-39-8.
- Maj A.F. Becke,History of the Great War: Order of Battle of Divisions, Part 3b: New Army Divisions (30–41) and 63rd (R.N.) Division, London: HM Stationery Office, 1939/Uckfield: Naval & Military Press, 2007, ISBN 1-847347-41-X.
- Gregory Blaxland, Amiens: 1918, London: Frederick Muller, 1968/Star, 1981, ISBN 0-352-30833-8.
- Steve Brown, 'Home Guard: The Forces to Meet the Expected French Invasion/1 September 1805' at The Napoleon Series (archived at the Wayback Machine).
- Nigel Cave, Battleground Europe: Somme: Beaumont Hamel, Newfoundland Park, Barnsley: Leo Cooper, 1994, ISBN 978-0-85052-648-6.
- Capt John Davis, Historical Records of the Second Royal Surrey or Eleventh Regiment of Militia, London: Marcus Ward, 1877.
- Col John K. Dunlop, The Development of the British Army 1899–1914, London: Methuen, 1938.
- Brig-Gen Sir James E. Edmonds, History of the Great War: Military Operations, France and Belgium 1917, Vol II, Messines and Third Ypres (Passchendaele), London: HM Stationery Office, 1948/Uckfield: Imperial War Museum and Naval and Military Press, 2009, ISBN 978-1-845747-23-7.
- Brig-Gen Sir James E. Edmonds, History of the Great War: Military Operations, France and Belgium 1918, Vol I, The German March Offensive and its Preliminaries, London: Macmillan, 1935/Imperial War Museum and Battery Press, 1995, ISBN 0-89839-219-5/Uckfield: Naval & Military Press, 2009, ISBN 978-1-84574-725-1.
- Brig-Gen Sir James E. Edmonds, History of the Great War: Military Operations, France and Belgium 1918, Vol II, March–April: Continuation of the German Offensives, London: Macmillan, 1937/Imperial War Museum and Battery Press, 1995, ISBN 1-87042394-1/Uckfield: Naval & Military Press, 2009, ISBN 978-1-84574-726-8.
- Brig-Gen Sir James E. Edmonds, History of the Great War: Military Operations, France and Belgium 1918, Vol IV, 8th August–26th September: The Franco-British Offensive, London: Macmillan, 1939/Uckfield: Imperial War Museum and Naval & Military, 2009, ISBN 978-1-845747-28-2.
- Brig-Gen Sir James E. Edmonds & Lt-Col R. Maxwell-Hyslop, History of the Great War: Military Operations, France and Belgium 1918, Vol V, 26th September–11th November, The Advance to Victory, London: HM Stationery Office, 1947/Imperial War Museum and Battery Press, 1993, ISBN 1-870423-06-2.
- Wilfred Emberton, Skippon’s Brave Boys: The Origin, Development and Civil War Service of London’s Trained Bands, Buckingham: Barracuda, 1984, ISBN 0-86023190-9.
- Capt Cyril Falls, History of the Great War: Military Operations, France and Belgium 1917, Vol I, The German Retreat to the Hindenburg Line and the Battle of Arras, London: Macmillan, 1940/London: Imperial War Museum & Battery Press/Uckfield: Naval and Military Press, 2009, ISBN 978-1-84574722-0.
- J.B.M. Frederick, Lineage Book of British Land Forces 1660–1978, Vol I, Wakefield: Microform Academic, 1984, ISBN 1-85117-007-3.
- Barry Gregory, A History of the Artists Rifles 1859–1947, Barnsley: Pen & Sword, 2006, ISBN 978-1-84415-503-3.
- Lt-Col James Moncrieff Grierson (Col Peter S. Walton, ed.), Scarlet into Khaki: The British Army on the Eve of the Boer War, London: Sampson Low, 1899/London: Greenhill, 1988, ISBN 0-947898-81-6.
- Lt-Col H.G. Hart, The New Annual Army List, and Militia List (various dates from 1840).
- Col George Jackson Hay, An Epitomized History of the Militia (The Constitutional Force), London: United Service Gazette, 1905/Ray Westlake Military Books, 1987, ISBN 0-9508530-7-0/Uckfield: Naval & Military Press, 2015 ISBN 978-1-78331-171-2.
- G.I.S. Inglis, The Kensington Battalion: Never Lost a Yard of Trench, Barnsley: Pen & Sword, 2010, ISBN 978-1-84884-247-2.
- Brig E.A. James, British Regiments 1914–18, London: Samson Books, 1978/Uckfield: Naval & Military Press, 2001, ISBN 978-1-84342-197-9.
- Martin Middlebrook, The Kaiser's Battle, 21 March 1918: The First Day of the German Spring Offensive, London: Allen Lane, 1978/Penguin, 1983, ISBN 0-14-017135-5.
- Capt Wilfred Miles, History of the Great War: Military Operations, France and Belgium 1916, Vol II, 2nd July 1916 to the End of the Battles of the Somme, London: Macmillan, 1938/Imperial War Museum & Battery Press, 1992, ISBN 0-89839-169-5.
- Capt Wilfred Miles, History of the Great War: Military Operations, France and Belgium 1917, Vol III, The Battle of Cambrai, London: HM Stationery Office, 1948/Uckfield: Naval and Military Press, 2009, ISBN 978-1-84574724-4.
- Lawson Chase Nagel, The Militia of London, 1641–1649, PhD thesis, King's College London, 1982.
- H.C. O’Neill, The Royal Fusiliers in the Great War, London: Heinemann, 1922.
- H.G. Parkyn, 'English Militia Regiments 1757–1935: Their Badges and Buttons', Journal of the Society for Army Historical Research, Vol 15, No 60 (Winter 1936), pp. 216–248.
- Keith Roberts, London And Liberty: Ensigns of the London Trained Bands, Eastwood, Nottinghamshire: Partizan Press, 1987, ISBN 0-946525-16-1.
- Edward M. Spiers, The Army and Society 1815–1914, London: Longmans, 1980, ISBN 0-582-48565-7.
- Edward M. Spiers, The Late Victorian Army 1868–1902, Manchester: Manchester University Press, 1992/Sandpiper Books, 1999, ISBN 0-7190-2659-8.
- Rev P. Sumner, 'Royal Facings: London Militia – 1795', Journal of the Society for Army Historical Research, Vol 15, No 60 (Winter 1936), p. 249.
- Instructions Issued by the War Office During October 1914, London: HM Stationery Office.
- Instructions Issued by the War Office During April 1915, London: HM Stationery Office.
- J.R. Western The English Militia in the Eighteenth Century: The Story of a Political Issue 1660–1802, London: Routledge & Kegan Paul, 1965.
- Everard Wyrall, The History of the Second Division, 1914–1918, Vol 2, London: Nelson, 1922/Uckfield: Naval & Military Press, 2002, ISBN 978-1-84342-334-8.
