= London Militia =

Part-time military force

The London Militia were the part-time military forces in the City of London. From their formal organisation as the London Trained Bands in 1559 they were periodically embodied for home defence, for example in the army mustered at Tilbury during the Armada Campaign of 1588. They saw a great deal of active service during the English Civil War, including the First and Second Battles of Newbury and the battles of Cheriton and Cropredy Bridge. Throughout their history they were used to suppress civil disorder and insurrection around the capital. In 1794 the London Trained Bands were reconstituted as part of the national Militia, and in 1881 the Royal London Militia became a battalion of the Royal Fusiliers (City of London Regiment). Although intended to be a reserve unit, the battalion saw considerable action on the Western Front during World War I. After 1921 the militia had only a shadowy existence until its final abolition in 1953.

== Early history ==
The English militia was descended from the Anglo-Saxon Fyrd, the military force raised from the freemen of the shires under command of their Sheriff. London was reoccupied, refortified and garrisoned by Alfred the Great in 886 after a Danish occupation. In 1006 the citizen-garrison repelled an assault by King Sweyn Forkbeard of Denmark. Later, as the capital and largest population centre in the kingdom, the defence of London was politically and strategically important. King Harold marched through London on his way to the Battle of Hastings, so it is highly probable that a sizeable portion of the fyrdmen in his army at the battle were Londoners. The universal obligation to serve continued under the Norman and Plantagenet kings and was reorganised under the Assizes of Arms of 1181 and 1252, and again by the Statute of Winchester of 1285.

In the Second Barons' War of 1264 the City supported Simon de Montfort and the barons against King Henry III, and Londoners formed one division of the baronial army at the Battle of Lewes. However, even though they were on the winning side the London footsoldiers were routed and cut down by a fierce cavalry charge led by Prince Edward.

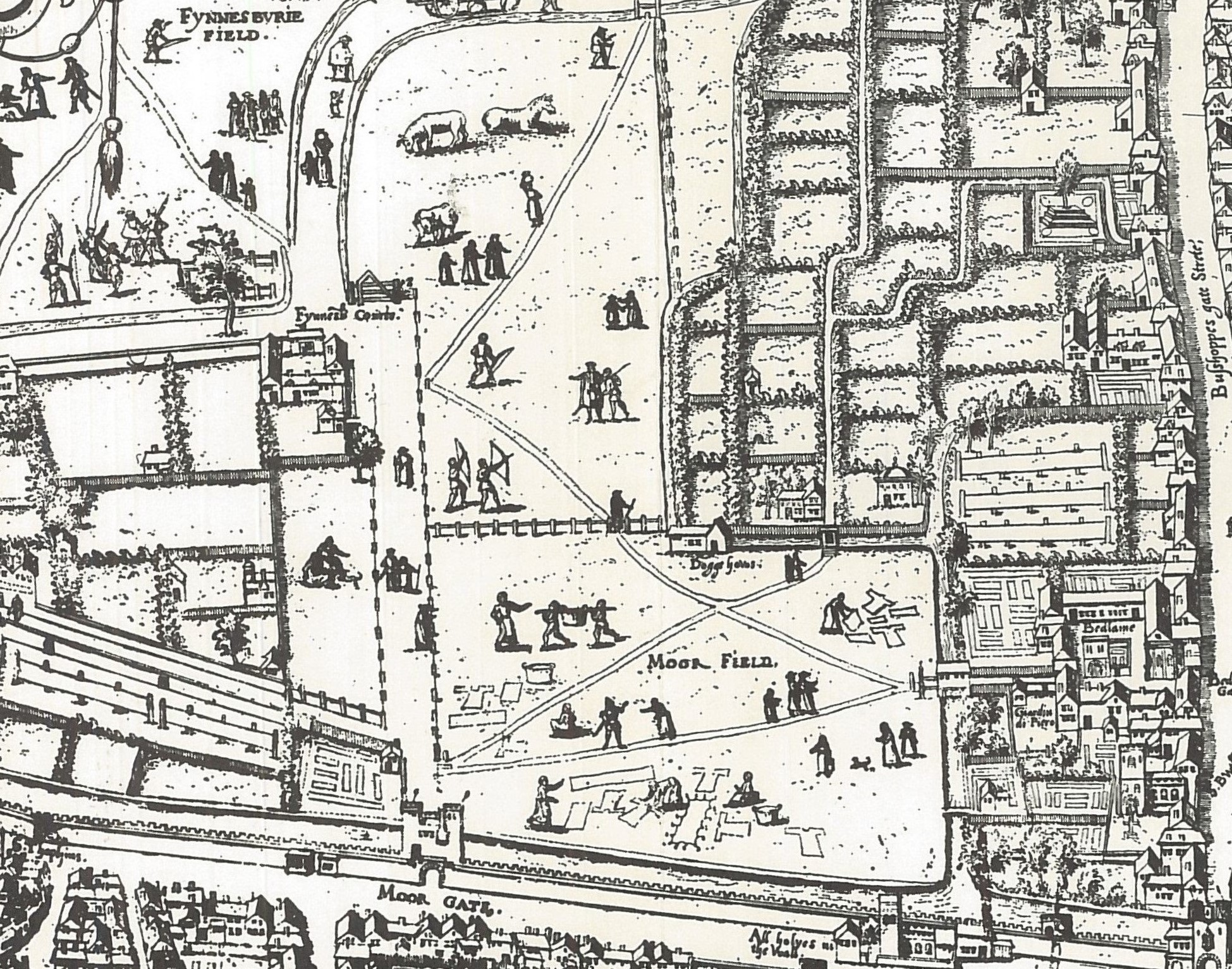
Moorgate in the 1550s, showing archery practice in Moorfields and Finsbury Fields.

During the Wars of the Roses there was a brief Siege of London when a naval expedition from Calais under the Bastard of Fauconberg allied with Kentish rebels attacked the city in 1471. Led by the Sheriff of London, John Crosby, the Londoners (tradesmen and apprentices who practised archery in the fields on a Sunday and the richer merchants who aspired to be gentlemen and possessed good armour) beat back attacks on London Bridge and the eastern gates of the city.

King Henry VIII strengthened the military capability of the country: in Acts of 1511 (An Act concerning shooting in Long Bows., 3 Hen. 8. c. 3), 1514 (6 Hen. 8. c. 2) and 1541 (the Unlawful Games Act), Parliament reiterated the obligation on boys aged from 7 and upwards, and all men of military age, to practise archery (with English longbows, not crossbows) and for all towns and villages to set up Archery butts. Moorfields and Finsbury Fields were popular archery grounds for Londoners. In 1537 Henry issued a charter to the Fraternity of St George whereby the citizens of London could practise with 'artillery' (missile weapons including longbows and handguns), and in 1539 he called out a 'Great Muster' across the country, when the 16,000-strong ‘Citie Forces’ marched through London from their muster at Mile End and Stepney.

== London Trained Bands ==
The legal basis of the Shire levy was updated by two acts of 1557 (4 & 5 Ph. & M. c. 2 and c. 3), covering musters and the maintenance of horses and armour, which placed the county militia under a Lord Lieutenant appointed by the monarch, assisted by the deputy lieutenants and justices of the peace. In the City of London the elected Lord Mayor and Aldermen fulfilled these roles and appointed the militia officers. The entry into force of these acts in 1558 is seen as the starting date for the organised militia in England. Regulations for mustering the militia of the City of London were issued by Queen Elizabeth I in 1559.

Although the militia obligation was universal, it was clearly impractical to train and equip every able-bodied man, so after 1572 the practice was to select a proportion of men for the Trained Bands, who were mustered for regular drills. In theory the Trained Bands met for a day’s training in each of the summer months, but for most of the country this was perfunctory, and they were in fact Untrained Bands, who would not serve outside their own district. London was the exception to the rule: its regiments were well trained, capable of putting up a stout defence, and the men were even prepared to leave their businesses for short campaigns. The Fraternity of St George had developed into the ‘Artillery Company of London’ (later the Honourable Artillery Company, HAC) with a drill ground and firing ranges at the Old Artillery Garden outside the city walls at Spitalfields. With similar groups it provided much of the officer corps for the LTBs and ensured that they were among the best-trained and equipped in the country.

=== Tilbury ===
When the militia were mobilised during the Armada Crisis in 1588, the London Trained Bands (LTBs) mustered 6000 men in four regiments (East, North, West and South) for the army assembled at the great camp at Tilbury, where Queen Elizabeth gave her Tilbury speech on 9 August. The LTBs were associated with the forces raised in the suburbs (the 'City Liberties' of Tower Hamlets, Westminster and Southwark).

=== Civil War ===
Control of the trained bands was one of the major points of dispute between King Charles I and Parliament that led to the English Civil War, but with a few exceptions neither side made much use of the trained bands during the war beyond securing the county armouries for their own full-time troops. The most notable exception was the LTBs, which were solidly behind Parliament. Increased to six large regiments just before the outbreak of war, they marched out to confront the Royalist army at the Battle of Turnham Green in November 1642, saving the capital for Parliament. In 1643 the LTBs were increased by six regiments of Auxiliaries, together with the TBs and Auxiliaries of the suburbs of Westminster, Southwark and the Tower Hamlets, brought under the control of the London Militia Committee. For the next two years brigades of City and Suburban TBs and Auxiliaries were regularly loaned to the small Parliamentary armies for specific campaigns.

A City Brigade marched with the Earl of Essex through Royalist-held territory to relieve the Siege of Gloucester and distinguished itself at the subsequent First Battle of Newbury (20 September 1643). Thereafter, brigades of London troops participated in the Siege of Basing House and the battles of Alton (13 December 1643), Cheriton (29 March 1644) and Cropredy Bridge (29 June 1644). However, the men were usually unwilling to serve longer than their first paid month, and later brigades suffered from desertion: sometimes whole regiments set up a cry of 'Home, Home!' The brigade that marched with Essex into Cornwall found itself taken prisoner or locked up in besieged garrisons after the disastrous Battle of Lostwithiel (21 August–2 September). The Second Battle of Newbury (27 October 1644) saw the last participation by a London brigade in the field, but a number of regiments remained in garrisons until the end of 1645.

The creation of the New Model Army (NAM) in 1645 relieved the citizen-soldiers of these duties, but the Army Crisis of 1648 saw Parliament try to use the LTBs as a counterweight to the NAM. The response was poor, but just weeks later the LTBs cheerfully turned out to defend the city against a Royalist force in the Second English Civil War. They also guarded the city during the Third English Civil War of 1650. Under the Commonwealth and Protectorate the English Militia were reformed and integrated into the system of military government. However, the LTBs retained their special status and were not required to serve outside the City without their consent.

=== 1660–1794 ===
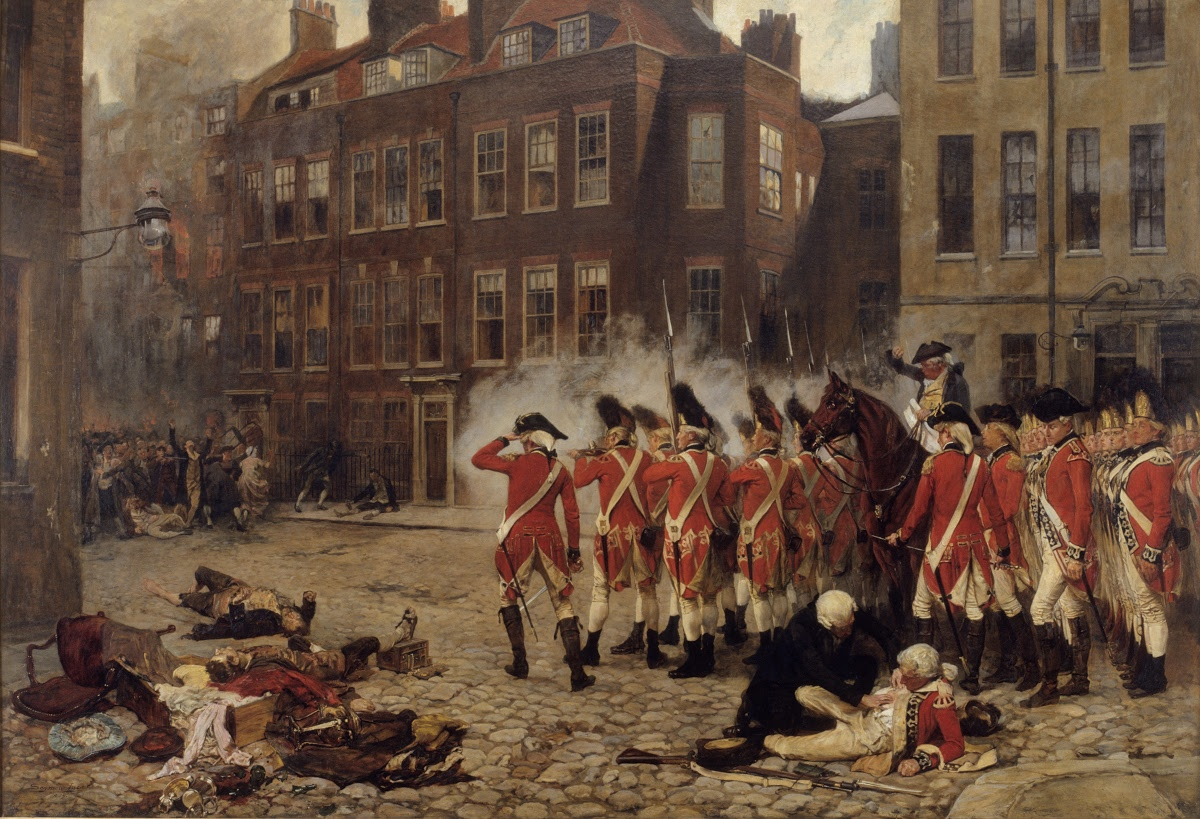
Troops firing on the Gordon Rioters, from an 1879 painting The Gordon Riots by John Seymour Lucas.

After the crisis following Oliver Cromwell's death, the City welcomed the Restoration of the Monarchy in 1660, and the LTBs lined the streets for the arrival of Charles II. They were soon in action in the suppression of Venner's Rising. The LTBs were routinely called out to suppress riots in London, notably by weavers in 1675 and 1689, and trained bandsmen patrolled the streets during the time of the Popish Plot and the Exclusion Crisis of 1678–81.

The LTBs were not employed during the Glorious Revolution of 1688, when London transferred its loyalty to William and Mary, or during the subsequent wars. Generally the militia declined after the Peace of Utrecht, effectively disappearing in most counties, but not London where the LTBs and HAC continued to play a role in civic ceremonies. During the Jacobite Rising of 1745 the LTBs were employed to guard the approaches to London.

The LTBs were deployed on the streets of London during the Gordon Riots of 1780, opening fire on the rioters in defence of the Bank of England. Following the riots a permanent Bank Picquet was stationed every night until 1973, usually provided by the Brigade of Guards, but by the LTBs or HAC during elections (when it was illegal for the army to be stationed in the city).

== Royal London Militia ==
The London Trained Bands, with their own Act of Parliament, remained outside many of the 18th Century reforms of the militia system. When the City militia were finally reorganised in 1794 the traditional six regiments were reduced to two, the East London Militia and the West London Militia under the Commissioners of Lieutenancy for the City. Unlike most county militia regiments which could be 'embodied' for permanent service anywhere in the country, one of the London regiments had to remain in the city at all times and the other could not legally be employed more than 12 miles away. Both regiments were awarded the prefix 'Royal' in 1804. They were amalgamated into the Royal London Militia in 1820, under its own Act of Parliament (the Militia (City of London) Act 1820).

After years of decline following the Battle of Waterloo, the Militia of the United Kingdom was revived by the Militia Act 1852, enacted during a period of international tension. As before, units were raised and administered on a county basis, and filled by voluntary enlistment. Training was for 56 days on enlistment, then for 21–28 days per year, during which the men received full army pay. Under the Act, Militia units could be embodied by Royal Proclamation for full-time home defence service in three circumstances:

1. 'Whenever a state of war exists between Her Majesty and any foreign power'.
2. 'In all cases of invasion or upon imminent danger thereof'.
3. 'In all cases of rebellion or insurrection'.

Now, rather than being drawn from city merchants, many of the Royal London regiment's officers were retired from the regular army, including a number of members of the Gentlemen at Arms.

The Royal London Militia was embodied for full-time duty from 20 February 1855 to 12 June 1856 during the Crimean War.

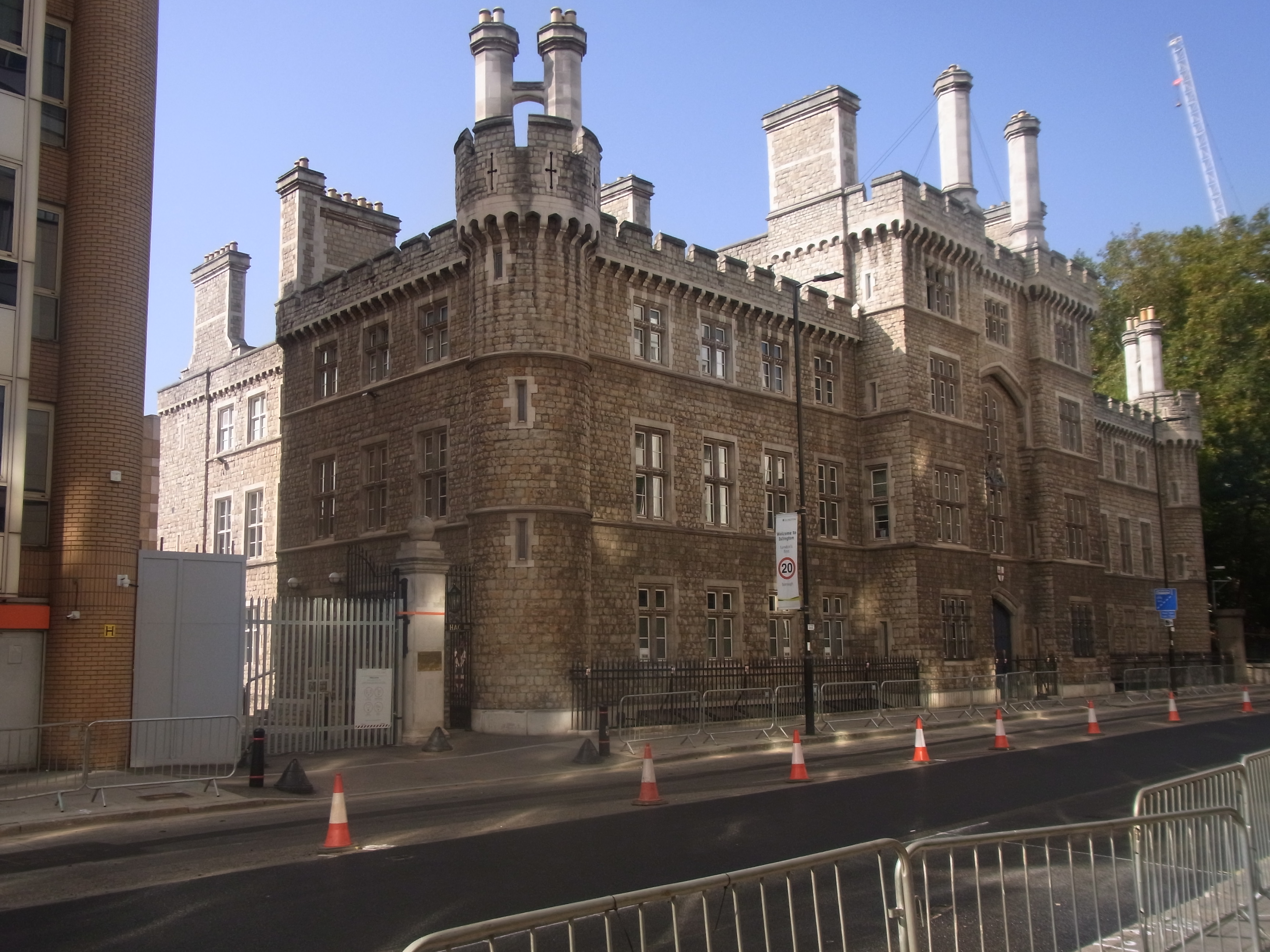
Finsbury Barracks.

The Commission of Lieutenancy for the City built Finsbury Barracks for the Royal London Militia on a site adjacent to the HAC's headquarters at Armoury House. The building was designed by Joseph Jennings and was completed in 1857.

Militia battalions now had a large cadre of permanent staff (about 30). Around a third of the recruits and many young officers went on to join the Regular Army. The Militia Reserve introduced in 1867 consisted of present and former militiamen who undertook to serve overseas in case of war.

Under the 'Localisation of the Forces' scheme introduced by the Cardwell Reforms of 1872, Volunteers were grouped into county brigades with Regular battalions and their local Rifle Volunteer Corps – for the Royal Londons this was in Brigade Nos 51 and 52 with the 60th Rifles and the 2nd Middlesex Militia. This was not particularly convenient, when the regimental depot for the Rifles was in Winchester. These were purely administrative arrangements, but a mobilisation scheme began to appear in the Army List from December 1875. This assigned Regular and Militia units to places in an order of battle of corps, divisions and brigades for the 'Active Army', even though these formations were entirely theoretical, with no staff or services assigned. The Royal London Militia were assigned to 1st Brigade of 3rd Division, III Corps. The brigade, consisting of three Irish Militia regiments as well as the Royal Londons, would have mustered at Tunbridge Wells in time of war.

== Royal Fusiliers ==
The Childers Reforms of 1881 took Cardwell's reforms further, formally turning the militia regiments into battalions of their linked regular regiments. However, while the 2nd Middlesex remained with the 60th Rifles, the Royal Londons were transferred to the Royal Fusiliers (City of London Regiment), a much more convenient arrangement. Consequently, the regiment became the 4th (Royal London Militia) Battalion, Royal Fusiliers on 1 July 1881. When the Royal Fusiliers raised two additional regular battalions in 1898, the Royal Londons became the 6th Battalion.

The battalion was embodied from 1 May to 18 October 1900 during the Second Boer War.

== Special Reserve ==
After the Boer War, the future of the militia was called into question. There were moves to reform the Auxiliary Forces (Militia, Yeomanry and Volunteers) to take their place in the six Army Corps proposed by the Secretary of State for War, St John Brodrick. However, little of Brodrick's scheme was carried out. Under the more sweeping Haldane Reforms of 1908, the Militia was replaced by the Special Reserve (SR), a semi-professional force whose role was to provide reinforcement drafts for regular units serving overseas in wartime, rather like the earlier Militia Reserve. The battalion became the 7th (Extra Reserve) Battalion, Royal Fusiliers, on 28 June 1908.

=== World War I ===
The 7th (Extra Reserve) Battalion was one of only a few SR battalions that was employed for combat during World War I, probably because the Royal Fusiliers had three SR battalions supporting four regular battalions instead of the usual 1:2 ratio. 7th Royal Fusiliers served (alongside the HAC) in 63rd (Royal Naval) Division on the Western Front, seeing a considerable amount of action from the Battle of the Ancre in late 1916. It fought at Arras and Passchendaele, against the German spring offensive and in the Allied Hundred Days Offensive. It was disembodied for the last time on 3 June 1919.

The SR resumed its old title of Militia in 1921 and then became the Supplementary Reserve in 1924, but almost all militia battalions remained in abeyance after World War I. They remained in the Army List, but by 1939 the 7th Royal Fusiliers had no officers listed. (Note: However, the Royal Fusiliers did have a number of Supplementary Reserve officers Category B attached to it.) The militia were not activated during World War II and were all formally disbanded in April 1953.

== See also ==
- Trained Bands
- Militia (English)
- Militia (Great Britain)
- Militia (United Kingdom)
- London Trained Bands
- Royal London Militia

== Bibliography ==
- W. Marston Acres, 'The Bank of England Picquet', Journal of the Society for Army Historical Research, Vol 12, No 46 (Summer 1933), pp. 74–83.
- John Adair, Cheriton 1644: The Campaign and the Battle, Kineton: Roundwood, 1973, ISBN 0-900093-19-6.
- Maj R. Money Barnes, The Soldiers of London, London: Seeley Service, 1963.
- Maj A.F. Becke,History of the Great War: Order of Battle of Divisions, Part 3b: New Army Divisions (30–41) and 63rd (R.N.) Division, London: HM Stationery Office, 1939/Uckfield: Naval & Military Press, 2007, ISBN 1-847347-41-X.
- Lindsay Boynton, The Elizabethan Militia 1558–1638, London: Routledge & Keegan Paul, 1967.
- John Childs, The Army of Charles II, London: Routledge & Kegan Paul, 1976, ISBN 0-7100-8301-7.
- C.G. Cruickshank, Elizabeth's Army, 2nd Edn, Oxford: Oxford University Press, 1966.
- Col John K. Dunlop, The Development of the British Army 1899–1914, London: Methuen, 1938.
- Wilfred Emberton, Skippon’s Brave Boys: The Origin, Development and Civil War Service of London’s Trained Bands, Buckingham: Barracuda, 1984, ISBN 0-86023190-9.
- Sir Charles Firth, Cromwell's Army: A History of the English Soldier during the Civil Wars, the Commonwealth and the Protectorate, 3rd Edn, London: Greenhill, 1992, ISBN 1-85367-120-7.
- Sir John Fortescue, A History of the British Army, Vol I, 2nd Edn, London: Macmillan, 1910.
- S.R. Gardiner, History of the Commonwealth and Protectorate, Vol III, 1653–1655, London: Longmans, 1903/Adlestrop: Windrush Press, 1989, ISBN 0-900075-85-6.
- Lt-Col James Moncrieff Grierson (Col Peter S. Walton, ed.), Scarlet into Khaki: The British Army on the Eve of the Boer War, London: Sampson Low, 1899/London: Greenhill, 1988, ISBN 0-947898-81-6.
- Lt-Col H.G. Hart, The New Annual Army List, and Militia List (various dates from 1840).
- Col George Jackson Hay, An Epitomized History of the Militia (The Constitutional Force), London: United Service Gazette, 1905/Ray Westlake Military Books, 1987, ISBN 0-9508530-7-0/Uckfield: Naval & Military Press, 2015 ISBN 978-1-78331-171-2.
- Richard Holmes, Soldiers: Army Lives and Loyalties from Redcoats to Dusty Warriors, London: HarperPress, 2011, ISBN 978-0-00-722570-5.
- Brig E.A. James, British Regiments 1914–18, London: Samson Books, 1978/Uckfield: Naval & Military Press, 2001, ISBN 978-1-84342-197-9.
- Lt-Col J.H. Leslie, ‘A Survey, or Muster, of the Armed and Trayned Companies in London, 1588 and 1599’, Journal of the Society for Army Historical Research, 1925, Vol 4, No 16 (April–June 1925), pp. 62–71.
- F. W. Maitland, The Constitutional History of England, Cambridge: Cambridge University Press, 1931.
- Lawson Chase Nagel, The Militia of London, 1641–1649, PhD thesis, King's College London, 1982.
- Sir Charles Oman, A History of the Art of War in the Middle Ages, Vol I, 378–1278AD, London: Methuen, 1924/Greenhill 1991, ISBN 1-85367-100-2.
- H.G. Parkyn, 'English Militia Regiments 1757–1935: Their Badges and Buttons', Journal of the Society for Army Historical Research, Vol 15, No 60 (Winter 1936), pp. 216–248.
- C.F. Richmond, ‘Fauconberg’s Kentish Rising of May 1471’, English Historical Review, Vol 85, No 337, October 1970, pp. 673–692.
- Keith Roberts, London And Liberty: Ensigns of the London Trained Bands, Eastwood, Nottinghamshire: Partizan Press, 1987, ISBN 0-946525-16-1.
- Charles Ross, Edward IV, London: Eyre Methuen, 1974/Yale University Press, 1997, ISBN 0-300-07371-2.
- Edward M. Spiers, The Army and Society 1815–1914, London: Longmans, 1980, ISBN 0-582-48565-7.
- Edward M. Spiers, The Late Victorian Army 1868–1902, Manchester: Manchester University Press, 1992/Sandpiper Books, 1999, ISBN 0-7190-2659-8.
- Sir Frank Stenton, The Oxford History of England, Vol II, Anglo-Saxon England, 3rd Edn, Oxford: Clarendon, 1971, ISBN 0-19-821716-1.
- Margaret Toynbee & Brig Peter Young, Cropredy Bridge, 1644: The Campaign and the Battle, Kineton: Roundwood, 1970, ISBN 0-900093-17-X.
- J.R. Western The English Militia in the Eighteenth Century: The Story of a Political Issue 1660–1802, London: Routledge & Kegan Paul, 1965.

=== External sources ===
- British Civil War Project
- Honourable Artillery Company
- Chris Baker, The Long, Long Trail
- Land Forces of Britain, the Empire and Commonwealth – Regiments.org (archive site)
