= Frederick Robertson Aikman =

Recipient of the Victoria Cross

Frederick Robertson Aikman VC
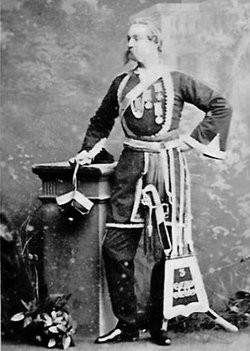
- Born: 6 February 1828; Ross, South Lanarkshire
- Died: 5 October 1888 (aged 60); Hamilton, South Lanarkshire
- Burial place: Kensal Green Cemetery, London
- Military career
- Allegiance: United Kingdom; East India Company
- Branch: Bengal Army; British Army
- Rank: Colonel
- Units: 4th Bengal Native Infantry; Royal East Middlesex Militia
- Conflicts: First Anglo-Sikh War; Second Anglo-Sikh War; Indian Mutiny
- Awards: Victoria Cross
- Other work: Member of The Honourable Corps of Gentlemen at Arms

Frederick Robertson Aikman VC (6 February 1828 – 5 October 1888) was a Scottish recipient of the Victoria Cross, the highest and most prestigious award for gallantry in the face of the enemy that can be awarded to British and Commonwealth forces.

== Early life ==
Aikman was born on 6 February 1828, and later baptised on 4 May. He was the son of Captain George Robertson Aikman, and decided to follow his father into military service.

== Military career ==
Aikman joined the Bengal Army, and went on to serve for eighteen years. He fought in the First Anglo-Sikh War, including being present at the Battle of Sobraon. During the Second Anglo-Sikh War, he was assigned to Major-General Hugh Wheeler's forces until the Indian Rebellion of 1857. During that war, he fought in a number of battles including the Siege of Delhi and the Capture of Lucknow.

At the age of 30 years, and while a lieutenant in the 4th Bengal Native Infantry, Bengal Army during the Indian Mutiny when the following deed took place on 1 March 1858 near Amethi, India, for which he was awarded the VC:

This Officer, Commanding the 3rd Sikh Cavalry on the advanced Picquet, with one hundred of his men, having obtained information, just as the Force marched on the morning of the 1st of March last, of the proximity, three miles off the high road, of a body of 500 Rebel Infantry, 200 Horse, and 2 Guns, under Moosahib All Ctiuckbdar, attacked and utterly routed them, cutting up more than 100 men, capturing two guns, and driving the survivors into, and over, the Goomtee. This feat was performed under every disadvantage of broken ground, and partially under the flanking fire of an adjoining Fort. Lieutenant Aikman received a severe sabre cut in the face in a personal encounter with several of the enemy.

He retired from the army on half pay due to the injury he sustained in the Victoria Cross action. On 4 March 1862, Aikman married Louisa Grace Hargreaves at St. Stephen's, Paddington.

He was appointed a member of The Honourable Corps of Gentlemen at Arms, the Queen's official bodyguard, on 13 May 1865, having been nominated by Lord Thomas Foley. While a member of the Guard, he was charged with being drunk and disorderly while in charge of four horses and a coach. He and a group of his friends and servants had been returned from a trip to the Epsom Races when he was arrested after driving recklessly. In 1871 he became Lieutenant-Colonel Commandant of the part-time Royal East Middlesex Militia.

Aikman was one of the jurors in Tichborne v. Lushington.

== Death and legacy ==
Aikman was one of 55 men awarded the Victoria Cross who were painted by Louis Desanges between 1859 and 1862. These paintings went on display at the Crystal Palace in the 1860s and 70s. Aikman's painting is now owned by and stored in the National Army Museum. Their collection also holds a second painting of Aikman; a portrait by Captain George Agnew Goldinham which was created around 1860. There are four photographic portraits of Aikman held by the National Portrait Gallery.

Colonel Aikman, died suddenly on 5 October 1888 during the County Ball at Hamilton, Lanarkshire. He is buried in Kensal Green Cemetery in London. He remained one of the Queen's Bodyguard until his death.
