= Reginald Hart =

Recipient of the Victoria Cross

General Sir Reginald Hart VC GCB KCVO
- Born: 11 June 1848; Scarriff, County Clare
- Died: 18 October 1931 (aged 83); Bournemouth, Dorset
- Burial place: St Mary's Churchyard, Netherbury
- Military career
- Allegiance: United Kingdom
- Branch: British Army
- Rank: General
- Units: Royal Engineers
- Commands: Commander of Cape Colony
- Conflicts: Second Anglo-Afghan War
- Awards: Victoria Cross; Order of the Bath; Royal Victorian Order; Royal Humane Society's Silver Medal
- Other work: Lieutenant Governor of Guernsey; Colonel Commandant, Royal Engineers

General Sir Reginald Clare Hart, VC, GCB, KCVO (11 June 1848 – 18 October 1931) was an Irish officer in the British Army and recipient of the Victoria Cross, the highest and most prestigious award for gallantry in the face of the enemy that can be awarded to British and Commonwealth forces.

== Early life and career ==
Hart was born at Scarriff, County Clare, son of Henry George Hart and educated at Cheltenham College. He was commissioned in the Royal Engineers.

== Details on VC ==
He was 30 years old, and a lieutenant in the Corps of Royal Engineers, British Army during the Second Anglo-Afghan War when the following deed took place on 31 January 1879 in the Bazar Valley, Afghanistan, for which he was awarded the Victoria Cross:

For his gallant conduct in risking his own life in endeavouring to save the life of a private soldier. The Lieutenant-General commanding the 2nd Division Peshawar Field Force, reports that when on convoy duty with that Force on 31st January, 1879, Lieutenant Hart, of the Royal Engineers, took the initiative in running some 1,200 yards to the rescue of a wounded Sowar of the 13th Bengal Lancers in a river bed exposed to the fire of the enemy, of unknown strength, from both flanks, and also from a party in the river bed. Lieutenant Hart reached the wounded Sowar, drove off the enemy, and brought him under cover with the aid of some soldiers who accompanied him on the way.

== Later career ==
Hart was appointed a district commander in Belgaum, Madras Command, on 2 March 1896. Following the outbreak of the Second Boer War in South Africa, he was on 5 October 1899 appointed temporary in command of the Quetta district (whose commander was sent to South Africa). He stayed there for three years until November 1902, when he was placed on half-pay and ordered back to England. On his return, he was appointed General Officer Commanding Thames District, where he took command on 8 December 1902, with the promotion to major-general on the following day. He was concurrently Commandant of the School of Military Engineering. Promoted to general, he served as Lieutenant Governor of Guernsey from 1914 to 1918. He died at Bournemouth, Dorset on 18 October 1931.

Sir Reginald Clare Hart is buried in St Marys Churchyard, Netherbury, Dorset, England.

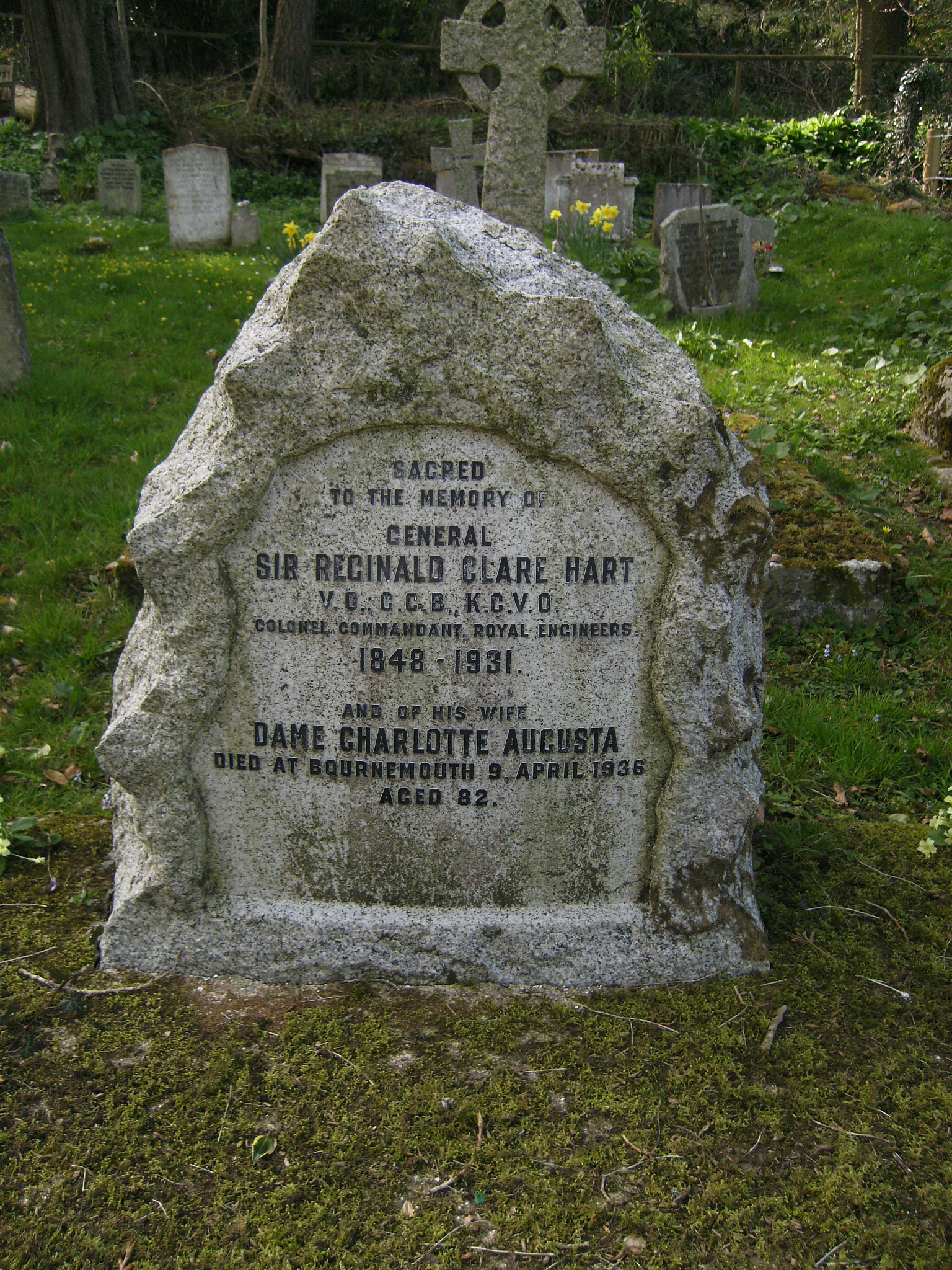
Grave at St Marys Churchyard, Netherbury

Government offices
Preceded by Sir Henry Lawson	Lieutenant Governor of Guernsey; 1914–1918	Succeeded by Sir Launcelot Kiggell
