= Royal East Middlesex Militia =

Auxiliary unit of the British Army

Royal East Middlesex Militia 6th (Extra Reserve) Battalion, Middlesex Regiment
- Active: 1662–1 April 1953
- Country: England (1662–1707); Kingdom of Great Britain (1707–1800); United Kingdom (1801–1953)
- Branch: Militia/Special Reserve
- Type: Infantry
- Size: A single battalion
- Garrison/HQ: Burgh House, Hampstead; Hounslow Barracks; Mill Hill Barracks
- Engagements: Second Boer War
- Battle honours: South Africa 1900–02

Commanders
- Notable commanders: David William Murray, 3rd Earl of Mansfield; Thomas Wood; Frederick Robertson Aikman, VC

The Royal East Middlesex Militia was an auxiliary (Note: It is incorrect to describe the British Militia as 'irregular': throughout their history they were equipped and trained exactly like the line regiments of the regular army, and once embodied in time of war they were fulltime professional soldiers for the duration of their enlistment.) regiment reorganised in Middlesex in the Home counties of England during the 18th Century from earlier precursor units. It later became part of the Middlesex Regiment. Primarily intended for home defence, it saw action in the Second Boer War. It was converted to the Special Reserve under the Haldane Reforms and supplied reinforcements to the Middlesex Regiment's fighting battalions during World War I. After a shadowy postwar existence the unit was finally disbanded in 1953.

== Background ==
The universal obligation to military service in the Shire levy was long established in England and its legal basis was updated by two acts of 1557 (4 & 5 Ph. & M. cc. 2 and 3), which placed selected men, the 'trained bands', under the command of Lords Lieutenant appointed by the monarch. This is seen as the starting date for the organised county militia in England. It was an important element in the country's defence at the time of the Spanish Armada in the 1580s, and control of the militia was one of the areas of dispute between King Charles I and Parliament that led to the English Civil War.

During the Civil War a great ring of fortifications (the 'Lines of Communication') was constructed round London, encompassing Westminster and the suburban parishes of east Middlesex, whose trained bands came under the London Militia Committee and saw active service as part of the Westminster Trained Bands.

The English Militia was re-established under local control in 1662 after the Restoration of the monarchy. Middlesex had three regiments: the 'Red Regiment of Westminster', the 'Blewe Regiment' recruited from 'within the Bills of mortality' (ie the suburban parishes included within the London health district), and the 'County Regiment', recruited from rural parishes in the north and west of the county. In 1697 the Blue Regiment was commanded by Colonel John Bond and consisted of 1358 men in 10 companies. These arrangements appear to have continued until at least 1722 (when the colonel was Gilbert Medlycott) but thereafter the militia was allowed to decline.

== East Middlesex Militia ==
Under threat of French invasion during the Seven Years' War a series of Militia Acts from 1757 re-established county militia regiments, the men being conscripted by means of parish ballots (paid substitutes were permitted) to serve for three years. The regiments could be called out for permanent duty in home defence but could not serve overseas. There was a property qualification for officers, who were commissioned by the lord lieutenant. An adjutant and drill sergeants were to be provided to each regiment from the Regular Army, and arms and accoutrements would be supplied when the county had secured 60 per cent of its quota of recruits. Middlesex was given a quota of 1600 men to raise, but failed to do so – possibly because the Lord Lieutenant of Middlesex, the Duke of Newcastle, was Leader of the Opposition, who had opposed the Militia Acts. A patriotic ballad of the time declared:

All over the land they'll find such a stand,
From our English Militia Men ready at hand,
Though in Sussex and Middlesex folks are but fiddlesticks,
While an old fiddlestick has the command

(the 'old fiddlestick' was Newcastle, who was also powerful in Sussex).

Claiming insufficient numbers of qualified officers, Newcastle suspended the execution of the Act in Middlesex for two years. However, opinion in the county shifted and in July 1760, the lieutenancy began forming three regiments (Western, Eastern and Westminster) and the arms and accoutrements were supplied from the Tower of London on 7 and 12 August. By then the war was going in Britain's favour and the threat of invasion had lifted: no further militia were required, and the Middlesex regiments were not actually embodied before the war ended in 1762. Parliament did however provide the money to continue training the militia in peacetime (two periods of 14 days or one period of 28 days each year).

=== War of American Independence ===
The militia were called out in 1778 after the outbreak of the War of American Independence, when the country was threatened with invasion by the Americans' allies, France and Spain. The three regiments of Middlesex Militia were 'embodied' for permanent duty for the first time on 31 March 1778, with the 1st Middlesex Eastern Militia at Hampstead.

In the summer of 1780 the East Middlesex formed part of a brigade under Lieutenant-General Simon Fraser in a training camp at Waterdown Forest, near Tunbridge Wells.

The Peace of Paris ended the war in 1783, but the militia had already been disembodied in 1782. From 1784 to 1792 the militia were assembled for their 28 days' annual peacetime training, but to save money only two-thirds of the men were actually mustered each year.

=== French Revolutionary and Napoleonic Wars ===
The militia were already being embodied when Revolutionary France declared war on Britain on 1 February 1793. Middlesex remained the worst 'black spot' for militia recruitment: in November 1793 the Eastern Regiment was 90 men short of the number it should have embodied. David William Murray, 3rd Earl of Mansfield was appointed colonel on 31 July 1798.

The French Revolutionary War and Napoleonic Wars saw a new phase for the English militia: they were embodied for a whole generation, and became regiments of full-time professional soldiers (though restricted to service in the British Isles), which the Regular Army increasingly saw as a prime source of recruits. They served in coast defences, manning garrisons, guarding prisoners of war, and for internal security, while their traditional local defence duties were taken over by the Volunteers and mounted Yeomanry.

In June 1793 both the East and West Middlesex regiments marched to join a large militia training encampment at Broadwater Common, Waterdown Forest. The whole camp moved to Ashdown Forest at the beginning of August and then to Brighton for two weeks before returning to Broadwater Common. The camp broke up in the autumn and the regiments went to their separate winter quarters.

In a fresh attempt to have as many men as possible under arms for home defence in order to release regulars, the Government created the Supplementary Militia, a compulsory levy of men to be trained in their spare time, and to be incorporated in the Militia in emergency and to keep up the numbers. Middlesex's 's quota was fixed at 5820 men. The suburban subdivisions of Westminster, Holborn and Finsbury provided 4987 of the quota. The number of militia regiments in the county was increased to five. But Middlesex was one of the 'black spots' for militia recruitment: when the first training of the Middlesex Supplementary Militia was held, only 70 came put of 485 summoned. The Earl of Mansfield complained in November 1798 that the Eastern Regiment had only received 120 of the supplementary men instead of over 700 it was due, and half of them were unfit.

The war ended with the Treaty of Amiens in March 1802 and all the militia were stood down. However, the Peace of Amiens was shortlived and the regiments, whose training commitment had been increased from 21 to 28 days a year, were called out again in 1803. Thomas Wood was appointed colonel of the Eat Mddlesex on 12 April 1803, and retained the position for 56 years.

In 1804 the Middlesex Militia was awarded the prefix 'Royal', when the regiment became the 1st or Royal East Middlesex Militia on 24 April (though in later years it usually left off the '1st').

During the summer of 1805, when Napoleon was massing his 'Army of England' at Boulogne for a projected invasion, the regiment with 1068 men in 12 companies under Lt-Col John Gibbons was at Ipswich Barracks as part of a militia brigade under Lt-Gen Lord Charles Fitzroy. While at Ipswich it took part in a grand review on Rushmere Heath before the Commander-in-Chief, the Duke of York.

The Napoleonic Wars were ended with the Battle of Waterloo in 1815. The Royal East Middlesex Militia was finally disembodied in 1816. After Waterloo there was another long peace. Although officers continued to be commissioned into the militia and ballots were still held until suspended by the Militia Act 1829, the regiments were rarely assembled for training and the permanent staffs of sergeants and drummers (who were occasionally used to maintain public order) were progressively reduced.

== 1852 Reforms ==
The Militia of the United Kingdom was revived by the Militia Act 1852, enacted during a period of international tension. As before, units were raised and administered on a county basis, and filled by voluntary enlistment (although conscription by means of the militia ballot might be used if the counties failed to meet their quotas). Training was for 56 days on enlistment, then for 21–28 days per year, during which the men received full army pay. Under the Act, militia units could be embodied by Royal Proclamation for full-time service in three circumstances:

1. 'Whenever a state of war exists between Her Majesty and any foreign power'.
2. 'In all cases of invasion or upon imminent danger thereof'.
3. 'In all cases of rebellion or insurrection'.

As part of the 1852 reforms, the post of colonel in the militia was abolished, but existing colonels such as Thomas Wood retained their positions.

=== Crimean War and after ===
War having broken out with Russia in 1854 and an expeditionary force sent to the Crimea, the militia began to be called out for home defence. The Royal East Middlesex Militia was embodied at Hampstead by the beginning of February 1855, when the unit's strength was put between 600 and 700 men.

The regiment moved to Aldershot by the beginning of June. Here it spent the period of its embodiment, returning to Hampstead by February 1856 and being disembodied by April. Although the 4th and 5th Middlesex Militia were embodied in 1857 to relieve regular troops for service against the Indian Mutiny, the number of regiments required was smaller, and the Royal East Middlesex were not called upon.

Thereafter the militia regiments were called out for their annual training. Colonel Wood camped with his regiment at Aldershot in his 80th year. After Wood's death in 1860 his lieutenant-colonel (since 1850), Thomas St Leger Alcock, formerly a major in the 95th Foot, continued as lt-col commandant. Alcock became the regiment's first Honorary Colonel in July 1871 and was succeeded in the command by Capt Frederick Robertson Aikman of the Bengal Army, who had won a Victoria Cross in the Indian Mutiny.

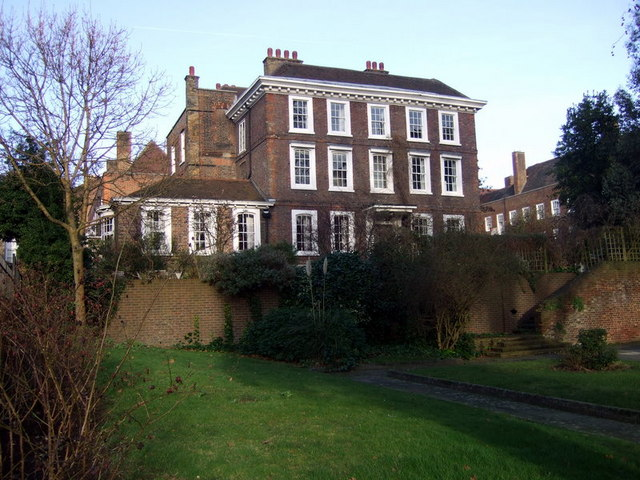
Burgh House, Regimental HQ 1858–81.

In 1858 the regiment took over Burgh House in Hampstead as its regimental headquarters (RHQ) and officers' mess, building barrack blocks in front of the house.

The Militia Reserve introduced in 1867 consisted of present and former militiamen who undertook to serve overseas in case of war. In September 1871 the British Army held Autumn Manoeuvres for the first time. 3rd Division was made up of militia regiments, the Royal East Middlesex under the command of Maj W.F. Northey serving in 1st Brigade along with the Royal West Middlesex Militia (now known as the Edmonton Royal Rifles), the Royal London and the 2nd Tower Hamlets (the 5th Middlesex were in 2nd Brigade and the 3rd in 3rd Brigade). The regiments camped in the Aldershot area and were exercised round Frensham and Chobham Commons.

=== Cardwell Reforms ===
Under the 'Localisation of the Forces' scheme introduced by the Cardwell Reforms of 1872, the militia were brigaded with their local Regular and Volunteer battalions. For the Royal East Middlesex this was in Sub-District No 50 (Middlesex & Metropolitan) in Home District, grouped with the 57th Foot and the 77th Foot, together with the 5th Middlesex (the Royal Elthorne Light Infantry Militia) and several Rifle Volunteer Corps. The militia now came under the War Office rather than their county lords lieutenant and battalions had a large cadre of permanent staff (about 30). Around a third of the recruits and many young officers went on to join the Regular Army.

Following the Cardwell Reforms a mobilisation scheme began to appear in the Army List from December 1875. This assigned Regular and Militia units to places in an order of battle of corps, divisions and brigades for the 'Active Army', even though these formations were entirely theoretical, with no staff or services assigned. The 1st Royal East, 2nd (Edmondton Rifles) and 3rd (Royal Westminster) Middlesex Militia constituted 2nd Brigade of 3rd Division, III Corps. The brigade would have mustered at Maidstone in Kent in time of war.

The sub-districts were intended to establish a brigade depot for their linked battalions: by 1877 Sub-District No 50 had still not done so at its intended site at Hounslow Barracks. Instead the regulars used Woolwich while the militia used Warley Barracks in Essex, the Royal East Middlesex retaining its regimental HQ at Hampstead. However, by 1880 all the linked battalions had moved into Hounslow Barracks, which was shared with the Royal Fusiliers. Burgh House became a private residence once more in 1884.

== Middlesex Regiment ==
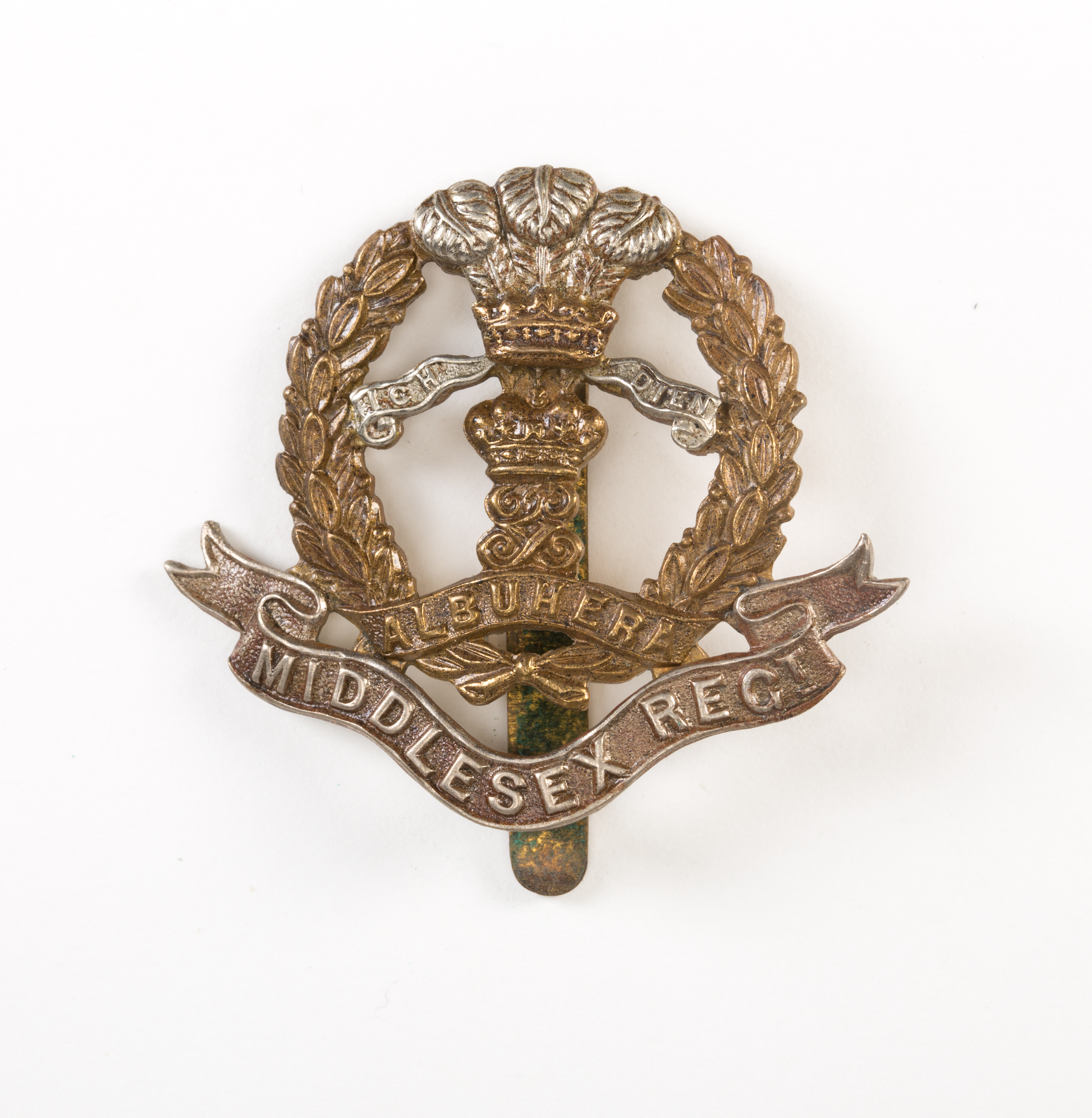
Cap badge of the Middlesex Regiment.

The Childers Reforms took Cardwell's reforms further, with the linked battalions forming single regiments. From 1 July 1881 the 57th and 77th Regiments became the 1st and 2nd Battalions of the Duke of Cambridge's Own (Middlesex Regiment), with the Royal East Middlesex becoming the 4th (Royal East Middlesex Militia) Battalion (at the same time the Royal Elthorne Militia became the 3rd Bn). In 1904 the Middlesex Regiment established its own regimental depot at Mill Hill Barracks.

During the late 1890s several regiments recruiting from large conurbations, including the Middlesex Regiment in the London suburbs, were increased from two to four battalions. When the new 3rd and 4th regular battalions for the Middlesex were authorised in March 1900 the militia battalions were renumbered accordingly, with the 4th becoming the 6th (Royal East Middlesex Militia) Battalion.

=== Second Boer War ===
After the disasters of Black Week at the start of the Second Boer War in December 1899, most of the Regular Army was sent to South Africa, and many militia units were called out. The 6th Middlesex was embodied on 13 December 1899. The battalion volunteered for overseas service and embarked for South Africa in February 1900 with a strength of 25 officers and 512 other ranks under the command of Col George Helme, a retired regular lieutenant-colonel who had been commanding officer since 20 February 1889. On arrival at Cape Town on 16 March, the battalion was sent to Piquetberg Road to prevent the North Western Rebellion from spreading south into Cape Colony. When the crisis was over, the battalion moved to Green Point, Cape Town, on 29 May to guard the Boer Prisoners of War being held there. A renewed threat to Cape Colony at the end of the year led to the battalion being sent back to Piquetberg Road on 4 January 1901, with half the battalion under Lt-Col Herbert Brenchley being at Ceres with the machine gun detachments, two companies at Malmesbury, and a company at Tulbagh. Martial Law was proclaimed and Col Helme was appointed commandant of the district. Later, detachments were sent to Karoo Poort, Gydo Pass, Wellington, Porterville, Waterfall and Brede River bridges, Clanwilliam and Calvinia.

On 29 May the garrisons were reorganised, battalion headquarters moving to Magersfontein and all detachments being brought in except those at Porterville and Calvinia. The battalion then manned the blockhouses on the Magersfontein to Fraserburg Road line, and later to Sutherland. On 15 June Col Helme was appointed commandant of No 7 area, comprising seven districts, and next day Lt-Col Brenchley was appointed station commandant at Laingsburg. On 22 August Col Helme was returning from Sutherland to Magersfontein with a personal escort of 10 men from the 4th (4th West Yorkshire Militia) Battalion, West Yorkshire Regiment, when they contacted a party of 25 Boers. Helme and his men engaged at a range of 500 yards (460 m) and drove them off. Sutherland was attacked by 250 Boers on 7 September, only 12 hours after the defences had been completed. The town was defended by two companies of the 6th Middlesex under Capt Percival Graves, together with a small town guard and a Troop of district mounted troops. Firing went on from 08.30 to 17.30 but the enemy were unable to approach closer than 1,000 yards (910 m). In September a party of Boers attempted to capture Cossack Post on a kopje near Calvinia, but Capt Charles Oldfield and 20 men of the 6th Middlesex came out of Calvinia and captured nine of them. In September the battalion provided detachments to Worcester and Ceres, and in October small detachments at Hex River Pass, De Doorns, Tweefontein and Triangle. On 22 September Capt Graves and his company assisted in capturing Boers hidden in a cornfield at Tentelbosch Hoek. On 14 November the same company, forming part of Lt-Col Calwell's column, seized a kopje near Vogelfontein that had been occupied by the enemy.

On 22 February 1902 battalion HQ and four companies moved to Beaufort West, and in March HQ and six companies moved to Cape Town to embark for home. The remaining two companies were surrounded by Cape rebels at Clanwilliam and Calvinia, but they rejoined the battalion after being relieved. The battalion was disembodied on 1 April 1902 after arriving home. It had suffered casualties of 1 warrant officer and 26 other ranks killed or died of disease. It was awarded the Battle Honour South Africa 1900–02, and the participants received the Queen's South Africa Medal with the clasp for 'Cape Colony' and the King's South Africa Medal with clasps '1901'.

== Special Reserve ==
After the Boer War, there were moves to reform the Auxiliary Forces (militia, yeomanry and volunteers) to take their place in the six army corps proposed by St John Brodrick as Secretary of State for War. However, little of Brodrick's scheme was carried out. Under the sweeping Haldane Reforms of 1908, the militia was replaced by the Special Reserve, a semi-professional force similar to the previous militia reserve, whose role was to provide reinforcement drafts for regular units serving overseas in wartime. The 6th (Royal East Middlesex Militia) Bn became the 6th (Extra Reserve) Battalion, Middlesex Regiment on 14 June 1908.

== World War I ==
=== 6th (Reserve) Battalion ===
On the outbreak of World War I, the battalion mobilised at Mill Hill on 4 August 1914 under Lt-Col G.E. Barker, who had been the commanding officer since 1 September 1913. Later in August, together with the 5th Bn it went to its war station in the Thames & Medway Garrison, first at Rochester, then from November 1915 at Chatham, where it remained for the whole of the war.

The 6th Battalion's role was to equip the Reservists and Special Reservists of the Middlesex Regiment and send them as reinforcement drafts to the Regular battalions serving overseas (the 1st, 2nd and 4th on the Western Front, the 3rd at Salonika). Once the pool of reservists had dried up, the 6th Bn trained thousands of raw recruits for the active service battalions. The 14th and 15th (Reserve) Battalions were formed in October 1914 alongside the 5th and 6th Bns in the Medway towns to provide reinforcements for the 'Kitchener's Army' battalions of the Middlesex (see below).

Under War Office Instruction 106 of 10 November 1915 the battalion was ordered to send a draft of 109 men to the new Machine Gun Training Centre at Grantham where they were to form the basis of a brigade machine-gun company of the new Machine Gun Corps. In addition, 10 men at a time were to undergo training at Grantham as battalion machine gunners. The order stated that 'Great care should be taken in the selection of men for training as machine gunners as only well educated and intelligent men are suitable for this work'.

The battalion continued working after the Armistice with Germany until it was disembodied on 28 February 1919.

=== 15th (Reserve) Battalion ===
After Lord Kitchener issued his call for volunteers in August 1914, the battalions of the 1st, 2nd and 3rd New Armies ('K1', 'K2' and 'K3' of 'Kitchener's Army') were quickly formed at the regimental depots. The SR battalions also swelled with new recruits and were soon well above their establishment strength. On 8 October 1914 each SR battalion was ordered to use the surplus to form a service battalion of the 4th New Army ('K4'). Accordingly, the 6th (Reserve) Bn formed the 15th (Service) Bn on 25 October in the Thames & Medway Garrison. It was assigned to 93rd Brigade of 31st Division and began training for active service. By December 1915 it was at Snodland, Kent. On 10 April 1915 the War Office decided to convert the K4 battalions into 2nd Reserve units, providing drafts for the K1–K3 battalions in the same way that the SR was doing for the Regular battalions. The battalion became 15th (Reserve) Bn and 93rd Bde became 5th Reserve Brigade. By May 1915 it was at Colchester in Essex where it trained drafts for the 11th, 12th, and 13th (Service) Bns of the Middlesex. In October 1915 it moved to Shoreham-by-Sea in Sussex. On 1 September 1916 the 2nd Reserve battalions were transferred to the Training Reserve (TR) and 15th Middlesex was absorbed into the other battalions of 5th Reserve Bde.

=== Postwar ===
The SR resumed its old title of Militia in 1921 but like most militia units the 5th Middlesex remained in abeyance after World War I. By the outbreak of World War II in 1939, no officers remained listed for the 5th Bn. The Militia was formally disbanded in April 1953.

== Heritage and ceremonial ==
=== Uniforms and insignia ===
Coat of arms of the County of Middlesex.

The 'Blewe Regiment' of Middlesex Militia got its name from the colour of its company flags rather than its uniform. When reformed as the Eastern Regiment in 1760 its regimental colour was white, carrying the Duke of Newcastle's coat of arms, and the facings of the red uniforms were also white. However, when they were embodied in 1778 all the regiments of the Middlesex Militia had blue facings (usually associated with 'Royal' regiments), long before the 'Royal' title was conferred in 1804.

The regimental badge was based on the Coat of arms of Middlesex, with three Saxon Seaxes in pale, hilted and pommeled, surmounted by a five-pointed Saxon crown rather than the normal royal crown. This badge was carried on the shoulder-belt plate of both officers and men from at least 1800. Even after adopting the Middlesex Regiment's insignia in 1881 the officers of the 6th Bn continued to wear it as a collar badge on their mess uniform until 1914.

The headgear of 1829-44 was a Bell-Top Shako. The shako plate plate bore a large crowned star mounted with facetted silver eight-pointed star bearing a gilt Garter Star with scroll inscribed ""Royal East Middx Militia"" across the tail of the Garter; the centre of the garter star was an enamel silver dome with red translucent Saint George's Cross.

The version of the badge worn on the undress Glengarry cap (Note: Standard British Army headgear at this period and not specific to Scottish units.) in 1874–81 consisted of the seaxes surrounded by a circle bearing the title 'Royal East Middlesex Militia', the whole surmounted by the Saxon crown.

In 1881 the battalion adopted the white facings and insignia of the new Middlesex Regiment. However, in 1902 the entire regiment adopted the lemon-yellow facings associated with the 77th Foot.

=== Precedence ===
During the War of American Independence the counties were given an order of precedence determined by ballot each year. For the Middlesex Militia the positions were:

- 6th on 1 June 1778
- 28th on 12 May 1779
- 7th on 6 May 1780
- 30th on 28 April 1781
- 14th on 7 May 1782

The order balloted for at the start of the French Revolutionary War in 1793 remained in force throughout the war. Middlesex's precedence of 22nd applied to all three regiments. Another ballot for precedence took place at the start of the Napoleonic War: Middlesex was 20th.

The militia order of precedence for the Napoleonic War remained in force until 1833. In that year the King drew the lots for individual regiments and the resulting list remained in force with minor amendments until the end of the militia. The regiments raised before the peace of 1763 took the first 47 places but the three Middlesex regiments raised in 1760 were included in the second group (1763–83), presumably because they were not actually embodied until 1778. The Royal East Middlesex Militia became 65th. Most regiments paid little attention to the numbering, but when new regiments were raised in 1855 some of them were given numbers that had become vacant: the 5th Middlesex received 28th (replacing the Pembroke Militia, which had been converted to Militia Artillery). It therefore outranked the Royal East Middlesex, leading to their relative precedence as 3rd and 4th (later 5th and 6th) battalions of the Middlesex Regiment.

=== Colonels ===
The following served as Colonel of the Regiment or as its Honorary Colonel:

Colonels

- John Bond, 1697
- Gilbert Medlycott, 1722
- David William Murray, 3rd Earl of Mansfield, appointed 31 July 1798; transferred to the Royal Perth Militia 3 May 1803
- Thomas Wood, appointed 12 April 1803, died 1860

Honorary Colonels

- Thomas St Leger Alcock, former CO, appointed 21 July 1871
- Lt-Gen Henry Kent, appointed 14 June 1890, reappointed to SR 14 June 1908

=== Battle honour ===
Like many militia units the Royal East Middlesex sent volunteers as reinforcements to the Regular Army in the Peninsular War, but its only overseas deployment as a formed unit was to the Second Boer War, for which it was awarded the Battle honour South Africa 1900–02.

=== Regimental museum ===
The museum of the Middlesex Regiment and of its militia units was located at Bruce Castle in Tottenham; it was closed in 1992 and its artefacts and holdings were then passed to the National Army Museum in Chelsea.

== See also ==
- Middlesex Militia
- Royal West Middlesex Militia
- Royal Westminster Militia
- Royal South Middlesex Militia
- Royal Elthorne Light Infantry Militia
- Middlesex Regiment
- Militia (Great Britain)
- Militia (United Kingdom)
- Special Reserve
