= Militia (City of London) Act 1820 =

Act of the Parliament of the United Kingdom

Militia (City of London) Act 1820 (Note: The citation of this act by this short title was authorised by section 1 of, and the first schedule to, the Short Titles Act 1896. Due to the repeal of those provisions it is now authorised by section 19(2) of the Interpretation Act 1978.)
- Act of Parliament
- Parliament of the United Kingdom
- Long title: An Act for amending and reducing into One Act of Parliament, Two several Acts, passed in the Thirty-sixth and Thirty-ninth Years of the Reign of His late Majesty King George the Third, for the better ordering and further regulating of the Militia of the City of London.
- Citation: 1 Geo. 4. c. 100
- Territorial extent: United Kingdom

Dates
- Royal assent: 24 July 1820
- Commencement: 24 July 1820 (Note: Section 1.)
Other legislation
Repeals/revokes	See § Repealed enactments
Amended by	Statute Law Revision Act 1888; Statute Law Revision (No. 2) Act 1890; Territorial Army and Militia Act 1921; Decimal Currency Act 1969; Statute Law (Repeals) Act 1976

Status: Partially repealed

Text of statute as originally enacted

Revised text of statute as amended

Text of the Militia (City of London) Act 1820 as in force today (including any amendments) within the United Kingdom, from legislation.gov.uk.

The Militia (City of London) Act 1820 (1 Geo. 4. c. 100) is an act of the Parliament of the United Kingdom that consolidated enactments related to the militia of the City of London.

== Provisions ==
=== Repealed enactments ===
Section 1 of the act repealed 2 enactments, listed in that section. The repeal did not annul or affect any proceedings had by the Commissioners of Lieutenancy for the City of London appointed and authorised by the repealed acts.

Citation	Short title	Description	Extent of repeal
36 Geo. 3. c. 92	London Militia Act 1796	An act for amending and reducing into one act of parliament two several acts, passed in the thirty-fourth and thirty-fifth years of his present Majesty, for the better ordering the militia of the city of London; and for the further regulating of the trained bands, or militia, of the said city.	The whole act.
39 Geo. 3. c. 82	Militia of City of London Act 1799	An act to explain and amend an act, passed in the thirty-sixth year of the reign of his present Majesty, intitled, "An act for amending, and reducing in one act of parliament, two several acts, passed in the thirty-fourth and thirty-fifth years of the reign of his present Majesty, for the better ordering the militia of the city of London, and for the further regulating the trained bands or militia of the said city."	The whole act.

== Subsequent developments ==
Sections 1 to 33, 41 to 44, 46, 47, 49 and 50, together with the long title and the preamble, were repealed by section 4(1) of, and schedule 2 to, the Territorial Army and Militia Act 1921 (11 & 12 Geo. 5. c. 37), which came into force on 1 October 1921. Section 48 was repealed by section 1(1) of, and part XIX of schedule 1 to, the Statute Law (Repeals) Act 1976, which came into force on 27 May 1976.
