= Henry George Hart =

British Army officer and author of Hart's Army List

Lieutenant-General Henry George Hart
- Born: 7 September 1808; Glencree, Ireland
- Died: 24 March 1878 (aged 69); Biarritz, France
- Military career
- Allegiance: United Kingdom
- Branch: British Army
- Service years: 1829–1878
- Rank: Lieutenant-General
- Unit: 49th Foot
- Conflicts: First Opium War; Crimean War
- Other work: Author, editor and proprietor of Hart's Army List

Lieutenant-General Henry George Hart (1808–1878) was an Irish officer in the British Army, who was best known as the author, editor, and proprietor of Hart's Army List, an unofficial publication recording army service.

== Early life ==
Born on 7 September 1808 in Glencree, Ireland, Henry was the third son of Lieutenant colonel William Hart who served in both the Royal Navy and British Army before emigrating to the Cape of Good Hope in 1819 where he died in 1848. Henry accompanied his father to the Cape, and on 1 April 1829 he was appointed ensign in the 49th Foot, then stationed there. Henry's mother Jane Matson (1779-1861) was the second daughter of Charles Matson (1750-1828) of Wingham, Kent.

== Military career ==
The 49th foot's regimental history suggests that Henry would soon have joined the rest of his regiment in India until 6 April 1840 when they embarked upon transport ships bound for China. During the remainder of 1840 to the end of 1842, the regiment took part in the First Opium War where they were engaged in the battles of Canton, Amoy, Chusan, Chinhai, Chapu and the Heights of Chinkiang.

After China the regiment returned to England but was later deployed to Ireland in 1845. As a regimental officer, Hart was a poor law inspector in Ireland during the famine of 1845–6. In 1856, when in temporary command of the depot battalion at Templemore, he suppressed a mutiny of the North Tipperary militia, defending the town of Nenagh.

The dates of his commissions were:

- Lieutenant – 19 July 1832
- Captain – 1 December 1842
- Major – 15 December 1848
- Lieutenant-colonel – 30 May 1856
- Colonel – 27 December 1860
- Major-general – 6 March 1868
- Lieutenant-general – 4 December 1877.

== Death ==
He died at Biarritz, in France on 24 March 1878. Buried at Boulogne-sur-Mer, in France, in a grave contiguous to that of his wife and under the same granite obelisk.

== Hart's Army List ==
When Hart joined the army, the main reference work was John Philippart's Royal Military Calendar of 1820. Hart supplemented information in the official army lists, using interleaved copies. In February 1839, supported by his wife and with the approval of the military authorities, Hart published the first edition of his Quarterly Army List, which was well received.

Hart was allowed access to the official records of officers' services, and in 1840 published his first Annual Army List, containing supplementary information in addition to the contents of the Quarterly. The role of editor was later taken over by his son Fitzroy. The List was published until 1915.

== Family ==
At the Reformed Church, Cape of Good Hope, in South Africa, 7 January 1833, Hart married Frances Alicia Okes (1809-1874), 4th daughter of the Reverend Holt Okes, D.D. Chaplain of Wynberg 1832–1852.

Their family of nine children included three surviving sons, who all served with distinction in the army:

- Jane Margaret Hart (1834-1896) married 14 August 1862, at St. Mark's, Surbiton, in Surrey, James Curtis Leman (1834-1897) solicitor
- Henry Travers Holt Hart (1836-1841)
- Holt William Hart (1838-1850)
- Frances Alicia Hart (1840-1923) married 23 April 1867, at Boulogne-sur-Mer, in France, Edward Coventry (1843-1914) corn factor
- George Okes Hart (1842-1851)
- Major General Arthur Fitzroy Hart Synnot (1844-1910), C.B., 1st battalion East Surrey Regiment, married 22 December 1868, at Boulogne-sur-Mer, in France, Mary Susannah (May) Synnot (1844-1913), eldest daughter of Mark Seton Synnot of Ballymoyer House, County Armagh
- Isabel Clara Hart (1846-1929), married 22 July 1868, at Boulogne-sur-Mer, in France, Lieutenant-Colonel Francis Mackenzie Salmond (1841-1900)
- General Sir Reginald Clare Hart (1848-1931), V.C., Royal Engineers. Married 6 August 1872, at Omeath Church, in County Louth, Charlotte Augusta Synnot (1854-1936) 5th daughter of Mark Seton Synnot of Ballymoyer House, County Armagh
- Colonel Horatio Holt Hart (1850-1915), Royal Engineers Married firstly 8 August 1872, at Paris, in France, Emily Aline Clements (1855-1902). Married secondly 2 April 1903, at Mussoorie, in Bengal, India, Alice Maud Goudall (1863-1950)

== Notes ==
Attribution

This article incorporates text from a publication now in the public domain: Stephen, Leslie; Lee, Sidney, eds. (1891). "Hart, Henry George". Dictionary of National Biography. Vol. 25. London: Smith, Elder & Co.
