= 90th Brigade (United Kingdom) =

Brigade of the British Army assigned to 30th Division

- Active: 19 November 1914–10 April 1915; 27 April 1915–1 September 1919
- Allegiance: United Kingdom
- Branch: New Army
- Type: Infantry
- Size: Brigade
- Part of: 30th Division
- Engagements: Capture of Montauban; Battle of the Somme; Battle of Arras; Battle of Pilckem Ridge; German spring offensive Hundred Days Offensive

The 90th Brigade was an infantry formation of the British Army during World War I. It was raised as part of 'Kitchener's Army' and was assigned to the 30th Division. After the original formation was converted into a reserve brigade, the number was transferred to a brigade of 'Manchester Pals'. The brigade landed in France at the end of 1915 and then served on the Western Front for the rest of the war, seeing action at the Somme, Arras, and Ypres. Virtually destroyed during the German spring offensive of 1918, it was reconstituted in time to take part in the final battles of the war.

== Original 90th Brigade ==
Alfred Leete's recruitment poster for Kitchener's Army.

On 6 August 1914, less than 48 hours after Britain's declaration of war, Parliament sanctioned an increase of 500,000 men for the Regular British Army. The newly-appointed Secretary of State for War, Earl Kitchener of Khartoum, issued his famous call to arms: 'Your King and Country Need You', urging the first 100,000 volunteers to come forward. This group of six divisions with supporting arms became known as Kitchener's First New Army, or 'K1'. The K2 and K3 battalions, brigades and divisions followed soon afterwards. So far, the battalions had all been formed at the depots of their parent regiments, but recruits had also been flooding in to the Special Reserve (SR) battalions (the former Militia). These were deployed at their war stations in coastal defence where they were training and equipping reservists to provide reinforcement drafts to the Regular Army fighting overseas. The SR battalions were soon well above their establishment strength and on 8 October 1914 the War Office (WO) ordered each SR battalion to use the surplus to form a service battalion of the 4th New Army ('K4'). In November K4 battalions were organised into 18 brigades numbered from 89 to 106 and formed into the 30th–35th Divisions.

Initially, the K4 units remained alongside their parent SR battalions. On 19 November 1914 the composition of 90th Brigade in 30th Division was finalised as:

- 13th (Service) Battalion, West Yorkshire Regiment, formed at York
- 9th (Service) Battalion, East Yorkshire Regiment, formed at York
- 11th (Service) Battalion, King's Own Yorkshire Light Infantry, formed at Hull
- 11th (Service) Battalion, York and Lancaster Regiment, at Harrogate

On 28 November Brigadier-General A.J.A. Wright was appointed to command the brigade. The units began training for active service, but the lack of uniforms, weapons, equipment and instructors that had been experienced by the K1–K3 units was even greater for those of K4, and by April 1915 their training was still at an elementary stage. On 10 April 1915 the War Office decided to convert the K4 battalions into reserve units, to provide drafts for the K1–K3 battalions in the same way that the SR was doing for the Regular battalions. The K4 divisions were broken up and the brigades were renumbered: 90th Brigade became 2nd Reserve Brigade.

== New 90th Brigade ==
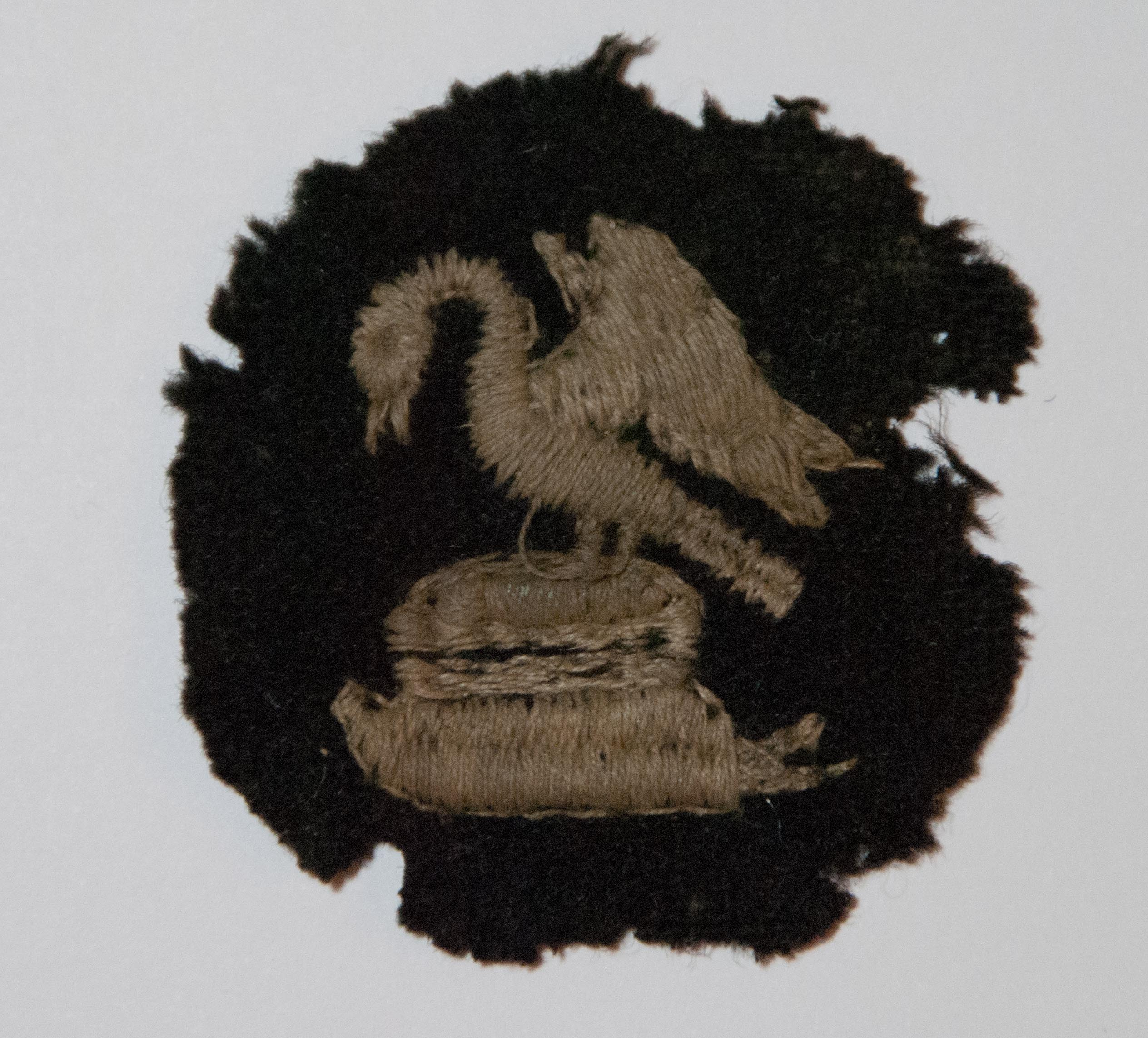
Formation sign of the 30th Division, based on the Earl of Derby's family crest.

Meanwhile, the K5 units had been forming since late 1914. These were largely raised by local initiative rather than at regimental depots, and were known as 'Pals battalions'. The first six K5 divisions (37–42) and their constituent brigades were given the numbers of the disbanded K4 formations on 27 April 1915. Thus 111th Brigade of 37th Division became the new 90th Brigade in 30th Division. This division had been raised largely by Edward Stanley, 17th Earl of Derby from the cities of Liverpool and Manchester, and was sometimes known as 'Lord Derby's Own', or more disparagingly as the 'Derby Family Retainers'. The divisional sign was based on the Stanley family crest. The brigade's original infantry units were 'Manchester Pals' battalions, which had been recruited by the Lord Mayor and City of Manchester on 28 August 1914:

- 16th (Service) Battalion, Manchester Regiment (1st City)
- 17th (Service) Battalion, Manchester Regiment (2nd City)
- 18th (Service) Battalion, Manchester Regiment (3rd City)
- 19th (Service) Battalion, Manchester Regiment (4th City)

After initial training at Heaton Park the brigade moved to Belton Park outside Grantham soon after it was renumbered. Training was hampered by the same lack of equipment as the other Kitchener units, but on 14 September 1915 30th Division moved to Larkhill on Salisbury Plain for final battle training. On 31 October it was ordered to France to join the British Expeditionary Force (BEF) fighting on the Western Front. Before leaving it was inspected by the Earl of Derby. It began entraining for the embarkation ports on 6 November and on 12 November it completed its concentration at Ailly-le-Haut-Clocher in the Somme sector.

BEF policy was to even up the experience between its New Army and Regular Army formations by exchanging brigades and then distributing the experienced Regular battalions through the New Army divisions. In this way 21st Brigade from 7th Division replaced 91st Brigade in 30th Division on its arrival in France, and on 25 December it exchanged 2nd Battalion, Royal Scots Fusiliers (RSF) for 19th Manchesters in 90th Bde. The brigade was also joined by its support troops in early 1916, giving the following order of battle:

- 2nd Royal Scots Fusiliers
- 16th Manchester Regiment (1st City)
- 17th Manchester Regiment (2nd City)
- 18th Manchester Regiment (3rd City)
- 90th Brigade Machine Gun (MG) Company – disembarked at Le Havre on 11 March and joined at Bray on 13 March
- 90th Trench Mortar Battery (TMB) – formed as 90/1 and 90/2 TMBs by 26 April, and combined into single battery by 16 June

=== First day on the Somme ===
For its first offensive action, 30th Division formed the extreme right of the BEF and was to attack alongside the French Army; its task was the Capture of Montauban. After a seven-day bombardment, the attack would go in at 07.30 on 1 July 1916, led by 21st and 89th Bdes: 90th Bde was then to pass through and complete the capture of the village. The first stage of the attack was a complete success, and the leading battalions achieved their objectives ahead of schedule. The battalions of 90th Bde had been in their assembly trenches in a valley west of Maricourt since 02.30. As arranged, its first two battalions, 16th and 17th Manchesters, moved forward at 08.30 in lines of companies, each company in line of half platoons in file, followed by 2nd RSF in support. Lieutenant-Colonel R.K. Walsh of 2nd RSF commanded the attack. They advanced under the shelter of Railway Valley, covered by a smokescreen laid by 89th and 21st Bdes. The Germans put down a barrage, but it was not heavy, and the effects were lessened by the soft ground, pulverised by shelling, though Lt-Col H.A. Johnson of 17th Manchesters was wounded. However, a lone machine gun, bypassed in the German front line, had already taken a heavy toll of the neighbouring 18th (Eastern) Division: now it swung round and enfiladed 90th Bde, causing severe casualties. Nevertheless, 90th Bde continued its advance 'with remarkable steadiness and enthusiasm', according to the Official History. It reached Train Alley and the line of 21st Bde 15 minutes before its scheduled time, and the troops had to wait until its covering barrage reached final intensity and lifted forwards. The leading waves sheltered in Train Alley while the remainder of the brigade lay down in the open. While they waited a Lewis gun team of 16th Manchesters located and eliminated the troublesome German machine gun. Although 18th (E) Division was still held up, XIII Corps HQ permitted 90th Bde to make its attack. When at last the artillery lifted the first wave left the trench and swept up the open slope towards Montauban, followed by the rest of the brigade. Owing to the heavy casualties (all the company commanders of the leading wave had been hit), the companies had become intermingled and the attack resembled two dense lines about 400 yards (370 m) apart. However, 30th Division had arranged for 4th Mortar Company of 5th Special Battalion, Royal Engineers (RE), to take their twelve 4-inch Stokes mortars up to Glatz Redoubt once it had been captured by 21st Bde. From there these chemical troops fired a smoke barrage to screen 90th Bde's attack. The attack was opposed by a single machine gun in Montauban; a well-sited trench in front of the village proved to be unoccupied, and at 10.05 the Manchesters and RSF swept into the ruins, which were empty apart from a fox. The front line pressed on through the ruins, the second line hurrying up behind. By the time the last of the smokescreen dissipated at 11.00, 90th Bde had entered Montauban Alley, beyond the northernmost houses, and captured there 100 or so Germans, who mostly surrendered without a fight. From the ridge here the brigade could see across Caterpillar Valley, where several hundred Germans were streaming away towards Bazentin le Grand. The artillery observation officers brought down fire on these fugitives, while 16th Manchesters rushed the enemy batteries in the valley and brought back three field guns. The brigade having achieved its objective, 2nd RSF and 201st (County Palatine) Field Company, RE, set about consolidating the position, while troops of 89th Bde passed through to take the division's third objective, a brickworks with a prominent chimney that the Germans had used as an observation post. Although 30th Division sent patrols ahead into Bernafy Wood (finding it unoccupied), it was not allowed to advance further, because the other British formations were held up and a German counter-attack was anticipated. Although German shelling caused casualties to the RSF and RE working on defences, the expected German counter-attack did not materialise. It was several days before Bernafy Wood was captured, by which time 30th Division had been relieved in the line.

Thereafter, the brigade took part in the following actions:

- Battle of the Somme
  - Capture of Trônes Wood (7–13 July)
  - Battle of the Transloy Ridges (10–18 October)

=== 1917 ===
- German retreat to the Hindenburg Line (14 March–5 April)
- Battle of Arras:
  - First Battle of the Scarpe (9–13 April)
  - Second Battle of the Scarpe (23–24 April)
- Third Battle of Ypres:
  - Battle of Pilckem Ridge (31 July–2 August)

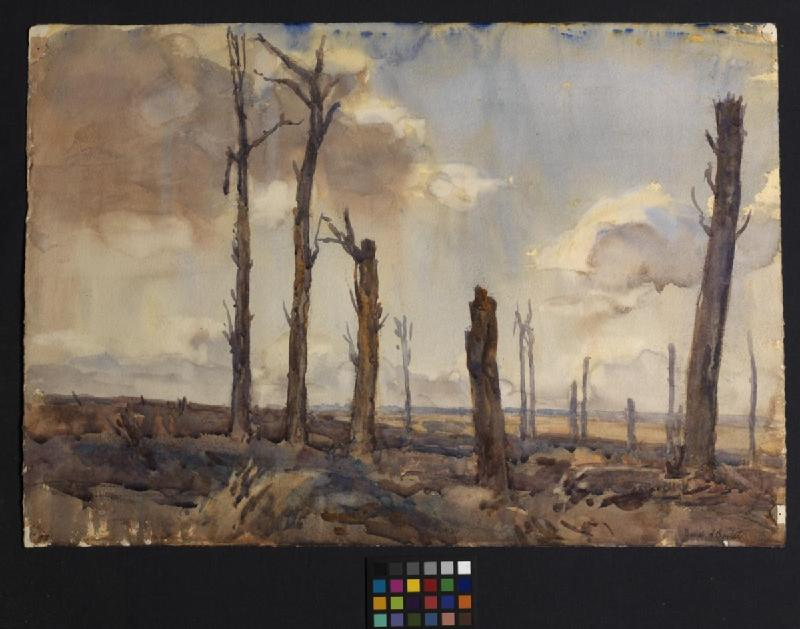
Sanctuary Wood, painted by David Baxter.

At Pilckem Ridge, the opening phase of the Ypres offensive, II Corps was given the toughest objective, the capture of the Gheluvelt Plateau. Within the corps, 30th Division had the hardest task of all, but it had not recovered from its severe losses on the Somme and at Arras. Although General Headquarters had suggested replacing it with a fresher division, this had not been done. The infantry attacked at 03.50 on 31 July 1917 behind a creeping barrage, but despite 14 days of bombardment, the Germans' rearward positions were still intact, and their guns behind the Gheluvelt Plateau remained unsuppressed. 21st and 90th Brigades made slow progress through Sanctuary Wood, held up by machine guns, and were left behind by the barrage. The left battalion of 90th Bde lost direction and strayed into Chateau Wood instead of attacking Glencorse Wood, and erroneously reported that it had captured the latter. The brigade was checked on its first objective (the Blue Line) by German machine guns firing from strongpoints covering the second line and from Glencorse Wood. From 05.00 the Germans put down an intense barrage on Chateau Wood and Sanctuary Wood, causing a complete breakdown in communications to the rear, so that part of 89th Bde went forward to try to attack the third objective when the second was till untaken. 30th Division was criticised for its performance by the chief of staff of Fifth Army, and after the failure on the opening day of the Ypres offensive, 30th Division was not used offensively again in 1917.

=== 1918 ===
By early 1918 the BEF was suffering a manpower crisis and brigades were reorganised on a three-battalion basis, the surplus units being broken up to provide reinforcements. 18th Manchesters was disbanded on 20 February 1918 and on 11 February 2nd Bedfordshire Regiment transferred to 90th Bde from 89th Bde in exchange for 17th Manchesters. The brigade MG companies were grouped into a divisional battalion of the Machine Gun Corps (MGC) on 1 March 1918. These changes gave 90th Bde the following organisation:

- 2nd Bedfords
- 2nd Royal Scots Fusiliers
- 16th Manchesters (1st City)
- 90th TMB

=== Spring Offensive ===
When the German spring offensive was launched on 21 March 1918, 30th Division was in the centre of XVIII Corps, holding a forward slope facing the town of St Quentin. 90th Brigade was disposed with 16th Manchesters in the Forward Zone and its other two battalions in the Battle Zone behind. The Forward Zone consisted a s string of outposts, with redoubts some 400 yards (370 m) further back that were organised for all-round defence. 16th Manchesters under the command of Lt-Col Wilfrith Elstob occupied the outposts and had D Company in the redoubt at 'Manchester Hill'. The position had a good field of fire over the forward slope – a concrete artillery observation post had been built on the crest – and a quarry in the rear providing dugouts and shelters from the artillery. The Germans attacked at 08.30 out of a morning mist after a savage bombardment, and the outposts were soon overrun. However, a telephone line from Elstob's battle HQ to brigade HQ remained open throughout the battle, and he was able to give a running account of the fighting. About 11.00 he reported that the Germans had broken through and were swarming round the redoubt. By 14.00 most of his men were killed or wounded, including himself, and there was hand-to-hand fighting in the redoubt. By 15.30 he reported that he had very few men left and that the end was nearly come. A Private nearby later reported that Elstob ordered the redoubt to be held to the last man, and his last words were 'Here goes the gallant Sixteenth'. Soon afterwards Elstob was killed and the rest of the garrison was overrun and captured, many of them wounded. Lieutenant-Col Elstob was awarded a posthumous Victoria Cross for his defence of Manchester Hill. Meanwhile German columns bypassing Manchester Hill had crossed the 4,000 yards (3,700 m) to approach the main Battle Zone. By now the mist had cleared and they were in full view of the defences sited on a reverse slope swept by machine guns and supported by artillery. Fighting went on all afternoon, with heavy casualties to the German infantry. By nightfall the Germans had gained a footing in the village of Roupy defended by 21st Bde, but could not take the 'Keep' in the centre, and a counter-attack by 89th Bde from reserve took back some of the ground. 90th Brigade's Battle Zone held by 2nd Bedfords and 2nd RSF had not been penetrated at all. 30th Division had carried out one of the most successful defensive actions of the day.

During 22 March 90th Bde's positions came under renewed attack. The Germans entered the front line of the Battle Zone, but were driven out and back into the village of Savy. Then in another attack at 14.00 they captured the whole of the front line; after making some counter-attacks the garrison fell back on 'Stevens Redoubt', the HQ of 2nd Bedfords in the rear of the Battle Zone north of 2nd RSF at Étreillers. Reinforced by two companies of the 18th (Lancashire Hussars) Bn King's (Liverpool Regiment) from 89th Bde, the Bedfords held on in the redoubt. Just as ammunition began to run out, they were ordered to retire through 20th (Light) Division, and because the 'Green Line' trenches in the rear had not been finished they had to go back to Ham on the River Somme. Considerable casualties were sustained by 2nd Bedfords in breaking contact with the enemy. 2nd Royal Scots Fusiliers were less heavily engaged and were able to evacuate Étreillers more easily. That night 90th Bde crossed the Somme and went into reserve while 89th Bde held the Ham bridgehead.

Next day (23 March) 89th Bde was driven out of Ham and across the river. By the end of the day, the Germans had gained crossings of the river and canal, despite bridge demolitions, and XVIII Corps had been forced back. On 24 March the two battalions of 90th Bde held the line at Verlaines, with 89th Bde (its three battalions now forming a single composite battalion) in support, but the Germans were lapping round 30th Division's flank. When 2nd Bedfords tried to extend the flank southwards and get into contact with 36th (Ulster) Division it encountered German troops. 30th Division resumed its withdrawal soon after 10.30. Once the artillery had pulled back, the infantry (much mixed up) crossed the Canal du Nord at Lannoy Farm. That night 90th Bde dug in along the deep canal cutting, with the other two brigades in support. The following day (25 March) the division held its ground, despite heavy bombardment, but about 16.00 it began to be shelled from its right rear, while German troops who had crossed the canal further along began rolling up its line. Half an hour later it was ordered to retire through the French troops who had come up in support, though casualties were heavy during this retirement. By daybreak on 26 March what was left of 30th Division (no more than about 1000 men) was assembled 7 miles (11 km) WNW of Roye, ready with the rest of XVIII Corps to fill the gap between the French and XIX Corps. 30th Division encountered the Germans moving towards Le Quesnoy; it took up positions at Bouchoir about a mile back and covered the rearguard's retirement from Le Quesnoy. That night it formed the front line. The German attack came at 09.00 on 27 March and fighting was heavy. Owing to a misunderstanding with the French, 30th Division fell back a short way, but was able to regain its position. However, that afternoon it had to retire to conform with the rest of the corps. The enemy did not follow, but pushed past the division towards Montdidier. French troops were supposed to relieve 30th Division that night, but it was not until midday on 28 March that the survivors were allowed to fall back through the French and across the River Avre into reserve.

The exhausted 30th Division was withdrawn for rest on 29 March, but the BEF had few reinforcements available for it. On 8 April 14th Argyll and Sutherland Highlanders (A&SH) joined from 40th Division in exchange for 2nd RSF, but the Highlanders had already transferred most of their men to reinforce other units, and only had 6 officers and 216 other ranks.

In early April 30th Division was sent north to the quiet Flanders sector under Second Army. However, this was the area selected by the Germans for the second phase of the spring offensive (the Battle of the Lys), launched on 9 April. 30th Division was positioned holding the most northerly sector of the Ypres Salient, and by 12 April the pressure on Second Army was such that much of the salient had to be abandoned in order to shorten the line. 30th Division completed its move on 15 April and 89th Bde went to support the fighting on the southern side of the salient, joining XXII Corps. On 19 April the rest of 30th Division was formed into '21st Composite Bde' under Brig-Gen G.D. Goodman of 21st Bde:

- 2nd Bedfords (with 2 Companies 2nd Wiltshire Regiment)
- 2nd Green Howards
- 16th Manchesters (with 2 Companies 17th Manchesters)
- 202nd (County Palatine) Field Company, RE

21st Composite Bde moved south to reinforce 21st Division, and was in position on 25 April when the Germans renewed their Lys offensive (the Second Battle of Kemmel), pressing back the flank of XXII Corps. Two companies of 21st Comp Bde were sent at 10.30 to fill a gap in the defensive flank between Voormezeele and The Mound while XXII Corps fell back to the Vierstraat Line (the Support Line). This was held for the rest of the day and reinforced by a succession of detachments and composite units while the Germans pushed past and drove the neighbouring French troops from Mont Kemmel. Next morning 16th Manchesters was holding the outpost line between Voormezeele and The Bluff when it detected enemy troops massing in its front. Unfortunately, its report to 26th Bde (to which it was attached) went astray, and when a bombardment began at 06.30 its SOS signal was unseen in the fog. It was 08.20 before any message reached the supporting artillery, and by that time the enemy had broken the line in several places. Three companies of 16th Manchesters and nearly the whole of No 2 Bn 39th Division Composite Bde were killed or taken prisoner. The fourth company of 16th Manchesters was in reserve in a tunnel at Spoil Bank on the Ypres–Comines Canal, but nearly half of this company was also captured. However, having taken the outpost line the enemy paused before the main line of resistance from Voormezeele to Zillebeke Lake. 2nd Bedfords holding the outpost line north of the canal found its position endangered by the loss of the Spoil Bank. It formed a defensive flank with one company along the canal and called for reinforcements, but all that could be found were three companies of 1st West Yorkshire Regiment of 6th Division who were working of defences south of Ypres. The enemy made several attempts to capture the Bluff, but the Bedfords and West Yorks held on until late in the afternoon. By then a new line had been established linking to the defensive flank, and the Germans did not advance beyond the Bluff. Next day (27 April) 89th Bde took over 21st Division's line on the canal while the survivors of 21st Composite Bde was withdrawn from the line and returned to the command of 30th Division. On 30 April the Germans called off the Lys offensive.

Given the shortage of reinforcements, not all the British divisions could be brought back to full strength, and a number (including the 30th) were selected to be reduced to cadre strength until fresh units could be brought back from the Palestine Campaign. From 2 to 11 May the remnants of all three brigades of 30th Division were formed into '30th Composite Brigade' under the command of Brig-Gen Currie of 89th Bde:

- 17th King's (Liverpool Regiment) (with available men of 18th and 19th King's)
- 2nd Bedfords (with available men of 2nd Wiltshires)
- 2nd Green Howards (with available men of 16th and 17th Manchesters)
- 202nd (County Palatine) Field Company, RE
- C Company, No 30 Battalion, MGC
- No 4 Company, 30th Divisional Train, Army Service Corps

In its short existence 30th Composite Bde served under the command of 49th (West Riding) and 33rd Divisions. For a while the units of 30th Division were used to train newly-arrived US Army battalions. In May the battalions of 90th Bde were reduced to training cadres (consisting of 10 officers and 45 other ranks) and dispersed: 2nd Bedfords to 18th (Eastern) Division and 16th Manchesters to 14th (Light) Division. The cadre of 14th A&SH briefly returned to 90th Bde from 21st Bde, but on 15 June it joined 16th Manchesters in 14th (L) Division and both went back to the UK to be reconstituted.

== Reconstituted 90th Brigade ==
30th Division was reconstituted in late June and early July 1918, 90th Bde now consisting of three London Territorial Force battalions from Palestine, where they had served together in 179th (2/4th London) Bde of 60th (2/2nd London) Division:

- 2/14th (County of London) Battalion, London Regiment (London Scottish)
- 2/15th (County of London) Battalion, London Regiment (Civil Service Rifles)
- 2/16th (County of London) Battalion, London Regiment (Queen’s Westminster Rifles)
- 90th TM Bty – reformed by 10 July 1918

=== Hundred Days Offensive ===
The reconstituted 30th Division was re-assigned to Second Army on the Flanders front. By the time the division was ready for action the Final Allied Advance (the Hundred Days Offensive) had begun, and Second Army was cautiously following a deliberate German retirement. 21st and 89th Bdes were engaged on 1 and 2 September, but 90th Bde did not carry out an offensive operation until Second Army launched the Fifth Battle of Ypres on 28 September. 30th Division was to watch for opportunities, and 90th Bde sent patrols forward, reaching the first objective by 07.00. At 15.00 it was ordered to make a short advance and complete the capture of that day's third objective, but now there was considerable opposition, though the Germans could be seen retiring from the Messines–Wytschaete Ridge. The brigade started at 05.30 next morning: information was slow coming back and the ground mist made observation difficult, but by 07.00 Brigade HQ was certain that its men were in Messines village, confirmation being provided when the Germans began shelling it. Progress north-eastwards was then rapid, there being little opposition. At 11.05 90th Bde was ordered to swing south-east down the valley of the Douve to take the Warneton–Comines railway. However, the orders did not reach the two leading battalions, who carried on to the Comines Canal while another division got across the line of advance and caused confusion. By the evening 90th Bde was along the canal, the rest of 30th Division being angled back along the railway. While other units of Second Army together with the Franco–Belgian armies continued pursuing the Germans to their fall-back line (the Flanders Position I), 30th Division held these flanking positions for the next three days, since it was still under fire from the south. When this fire slackened it sent patrols into Warneton and Comines.

There was then a pause in operations while the Allies prepared to assault the Flanders Position (the Battle of Courtrai). The attack on 14 October was successful. 90th Brigade reached its objectives by 07.30, although a few bypassed posts and farms held out a little longer. Patrols entered Wervicq, finding only snipers and machine guns there, but the railway in front was strongly held and the ground was commanded by the hills near Bousbecque, so patrols could not make much more progress. That night fires and explosions were observed in the towns ahead as the Germans prepared to pull out, and next morning 30th Division pushed patrols forward to the River Lys. At 02.00 on 16 October 2nd Civil Service Rifles crossed by a damaged bridge near Wervicq and worked downstream to Bousbecque to cover bridge construction by the REs. German shellfire failed to destroy the bridge, but accurate machine gun fire from the Linselles Switch Line prevented patrols from advancing out of Bousbecque. By 18 October the Germans had withdrawn, and 90th Bde led the division's advance; at nightfall its patrols had established a line on the Tourcoing–Courtrai road. It continued next day, the only resistance being from some machine guns in Bellegem and some shelling on the road. However, the enemy made a stand at Ruddervoorde and Rollegem: the leading brigades launched an attack at 16.00 and fighting went on through the night. On 20 October three battalions of 21st and 90th Bdes led the entire advance of X Corps towards the River Schelde. Starting at 07.30, 2nd London Scottish made good progress, but were brought to a standstill by machine gun and artillery fire at about 15.00. It intended to continue under the cover of darkness and pushed patrols forward to the Helchin road, but the two battalions of 21st Bde were held up on the Ruddervoorde spur. At 08.30 the following morning, 89th Bde passed through 90th Bde to complete the advance to the Schelde.

Second Army prepared an assault crossing of the Schelde timed for 11 November, but the enemy began withdrawing on 8 November and next day 89th Bde forced a crossing of the river. 30th Division advanced rapidly and on the morning of 11 November the 7th Dragoon Guards passed through the infantry to reach a line from Ghoy to La Livarde, north west of Lessines just as the Armistice came into force at 11.00.

Afterwards 30th Division moved back to the west and by 4 December was billeted in Renescure until the end of the month when its units moved to the base ports of Dunkirk, Calais, Boulogne and Étaples for duties there. In February demobilisation began, but 30th Division remained in existence until 1 September 1919.

90th Brigade was not reformed in World War II.

== Commanders ==
The following commanded 90th Bde:

- Brigadier-General A.J.A. Wright, appointed to original 90th Bde 28 November 1914
- Brig-Gen H.C.E. Westropp, appointed to 111th Bde 30 December 1914
- Brig-Gen C.J. Steavenson, from 3 September 1915, sick 20 August 1916; returned 2 September 1916, sick 21 September 1916
- Lt-Col H.J. Grisewood, acting from 20 August 1916
- Lt-Col R.K. Walsh, acting from 28 August 1916 and 21 September 1916
- Lt-Col J.H. Lloyd, acting from 23 September 1916, promoted Brig-Gen 13 October 1916
- Brig-Gen G.A. Stevens, from 13 November 1917 to Armistice
- Lt-Col H.S. Poyntz, acting 21 February–26 March 1918
- Lt-Col R.J.L. Ogilby, acting 11–18 August 1918

== Insignia ==
Troops of 30th Division wore the divisional sign as a cloth badge on the arm from 1918. The individual units adopted a variety of identifying flashes worn by all ranks at the top of the sleeve. In 1917 units of 90th Bde were using the following:

- 2nd RSF: no details of sleeve flash recorded; a black grenade with a white thistle on the bomb was painted on the right hand side of the helmet; when helmet covers were used between July and November 1917 these carried a diamond of 'universal tartan'
- 16th Manchester: a yellow over green bisected horizontal rectangle
- 17th Manchester: a red over white horizontally bisected circle
- 18th Manchester: two horizontal blue bars, the lower bar being shorter

No details of unit flashes have been recorded for 90th MG Company or 90th TMB.
