= 6th Battalion, Cheshire Regiment =

- Active: 20 February 1860–7 February 1920
- Country: United Kingdom
- Branch: Territorial Force
- Role: Infantry
- Size: 1–3 Battalions
- Part of: Cheshire Brigade
- Garrison/HQ: Stockport Armoury and Stalybridge
- Nickname(s): 'Astley Rifles'
- Engagements: Battle of the Somme; Third Battle of Ypres; German spring offensive Hundred Days Offensive

Commanders
- Notable commanders: William Legh, 1st Lord Newton

The 6th Battalion, Cheshire Regiment was a Territorial Force (TF) unit of the British Army. Formed in 1908 from Volunteer units recruited in Cheshire since 1859, it was one of the first TF units to go to the Western Front in World War I. It had a wandering existence, moving frequently from one command to another, seeing a considerable amount of combat at the Somme, Ypres, during the German spring offensive and in the final Allied Hundred Days Offensive. After the war it was amalgamated into a local artillery regiment.

== Volunteer Force ==
An invasion scare in 1859 led to the emergence of the Volunteer Movement, and Rifle Volunteer Corps (RVCs) began to be organised throughout Great Britain to supplement the Regular Army and Militia. A large number of small RVCs were formed in Cheshire and formed into five administrative battalions. The 4th Administrative Battalion, based at Stockport, comprised the following units:

- 9th (Mottram) Cheshire RVC, raised at Mottram in Longdendale 10 February 1860 under Captain Alfred K. Sidebottom, disbanded February 1861
- 13th (Dukinfield) Cheshire RVC, 20 February 1860 under Capt Francis Dukinfield Palmer Astley, was raised by the Astley family who owned the coalmines at Dukinfield, and known unofficially as the 'Astley Rifles'; a 2nd Company was formed on 15 November 1860 and a 3rd in March 1869; headquarters moved to Newton Moor, near Hyde, in 1863, then to Stalybridge in 1873
- 17th (Stockport) Cheshire RVC, 20 August 1860 under Capt Henry Coppock
- 18th (Stockport) Cheshire RVC, 12 March 1860 under Capt John Thomas Emmerson
- 19th (Stockport) Cheshire RVC, 15 March 1860 under Capt Samuel W. Wilkinson
- 20th (Stockport) Cheshire RVC, 20 March 1860 under Capt Thomas H. Sykes
- 21st (Stockport) Cheshire RVC, 22 March 1860 under Capt Cephas John Howard
- 29th (Stockport) Cheshire RVC, 10 April 1860 under Capt John M. Lingard, formerly of the 1st Royal Cheshire Militia
- 31st (Hyde) Cheshire RVC, 15 August 1860 under Capt Thomas Mottram

On 5 November 1860 Capt F.D.P. Astley of the 13th RVC was promoted to Lieutenant-Colonel to command the 4th Admin Bn. He was succeeded on 5 May 1866 by Lt-Col William John Legh, MP, and he in turn by Samuel W. Wilkinson (of the 19th RVC) on 25 January 1873.

The 23rd (Glossop) Derbyshire RVC, formed under Captain Commandant William Sidebottom on 2 February 1876, was attached to the 4th Admin Bn even though it was in the adjacent county of Derbyshire.

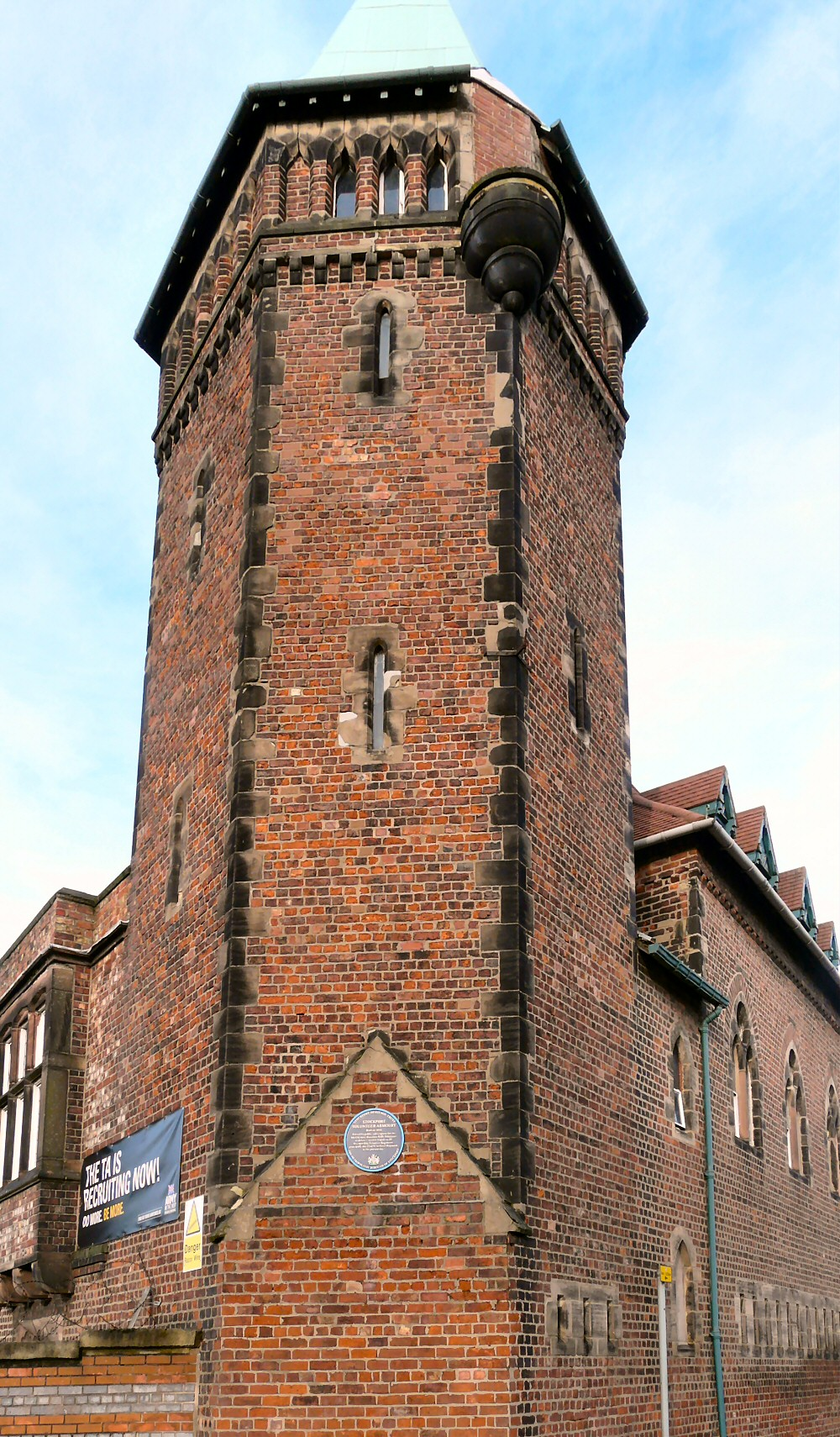
The Stockport Armoury was built in 1862 as the drill hall of the 4th Administrative Brigade of Cheshire RVCs, later the 6th Battalion, Cheshire Regiment.

When the RVCs were consolidated in 1880, the 4th Admin Bn initially became the 13th Cheshire and Derbyshire RVC, then the 4th Cheshire RVC, with the following organisation:

- A to C Companies at Stalybridge – from 13th RVC
- D Company at Stockport – from 17th Cheshire RVC
- E Company at Stockport – from 18th Cheshire RVC
- F Company at Stockport – from 19th Cheshire RVC
- G Company at Stockport – from 20th Cheshire RVC
- H Company at Stockport – from 21st Cheshire RVC
- I Company at Stockport – from 29th Cheshire RVC
- K Company at Hyde – from 31st Cheshire RVC
- L to M Companies at Glossop – from 23rd Derbyshire RVC

In 1862 the 4th Administrative Battalion built an impressive drill hall in Stockport, now known as the Stockport Armoury. The Stalybridge detachment (A–C Companies) also built their own drill hall in the Castle Hall area in about 1880. K Company at Hyde had its own armoury in Mottram Road.

Under the 'Localisation of the Forces' scheme introduced by the Cardwell Reforms of 1872, Volunteers were grouped into county brigades with their local Regular and Militia battalions – Brigade No 17 (County of Chester) in Northern District for the 4th Cheshire. The Childers Reforms of 1881 took Cardwell's reforms further, and the Volunteers were formally affiliated to their local Regular regiment, the Cheshire Regiment in the case of the Cheshire RVCs, and on 1 December 1887 the 4th changed its title to 4th Volunteer Battalion, Cheshire Regiment. When a comprehensive mobilisation scheme for the Volunteers was established in 1889, the 4th VB of the Cheshires was first assigned to the Welsh Border Brigade, changing to the Cheshire and Lancashire Brigade in the early 1890s. By 1901 the five Cheshire VBs comprised the Cheshire Brigade.

A detachment of volunteers from the battalion served in the Second Boer War, winning the unit its first Battle honour: South Africa 1900–1902.

== Territorial Force ==
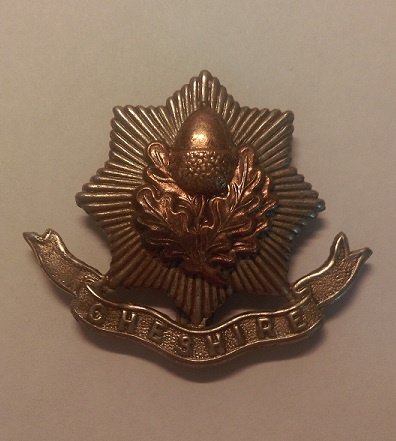
Cheshire Regiment cap badge.

When the Volunteers were subsumed into the new Territorial Force (TF) under the Haldane Reforms of 1908, the 4th VB became the 6th Battalion, Cheshire Regiment with the following organisation:

- Headquarters at Stockport Armoury
- A & B Companies at the corner of Astley Street and Walmsley Street, Stalybridge
- C Company at Mottram Road, Hyde
- D Company at Market Hall, Glossop
- E–H Companies at Stockport

The battalion formed part of the Cheshire Brigade in the TF's Welsh Division.

== World War I ==
=== Mobilisation ===
On the outbreak of war on 4 August 1914, the Welsh Division's units mobilised at their headquarters and had concentrated at their war stations by 11 August. On that date TF units were invited to volunteer for Overseas Service and on 15 August the War Office issued instructions to separate those men who had signed up for Home Service only, and form these into reserve units. On 31 August, the formation of a reserve or 2nd Line unit was authorised for each 1st Line unit where 60 per cent or more of the men had volunteered for Overseas Service. The titles of these 2nd Line units would be the same as the original, but distinguished by a '2/' prefix. In this way duplicate battalions, brigades and divisions were created, mirroring those TF formations being sent overseas. Later 3rd Line units were formed to train drafts for the 1st and 2nd Line.

=== 1/6th Cheshires ===
The 6th Cheshires was one of the first TF battalions to volunteer for overseas service. Its 1st Line left the Welsh Division at Northampton and joined the British Expeditionary Force (BEF) in France on 10 November 1914 to act as GHQ Troops, doing various duties in the rear areas. On 11 December it was attached to 15th Brigade in 5th Division. All the Regular divisions on the Western Front were desperately weak following earlier fighting and required any help they could get simply to hold the line during the winter months.

On 1 March 1915 the battalion returned to its role as GHQ Troops, and for the rest of the year carried out guard and other duties at Rouen, Abbeville, and Dieppe. On 9 January 1916 the battalion was assigned to 20th Brigade in 7th Division and returned with it to the front line.

In early 1916 the War Office was preparing to send out to France the last of the new Kitchener's Army divisions, including the 39th Division formed from so-called 'Pals battalions' raised by local initiatives. However, 39th Division's 118th Brigade was deemed unready for overseas service, so the brigade staff crossed to France and on 29 February at Renescure took command of five varied TF battalions already serving with the BEF, including 1/6th Cheshires. The rest of the division followed from England and it concentrated at Blaringhem on 17 March. 1/6th Cheshires were not involved in the division's first offensive action, at the Battle of the Boar's Head on 30 June when the South Downs battalions of 116th Bde suffered appalling casualties in a diversionary attack before the Somme Offensive began next day.

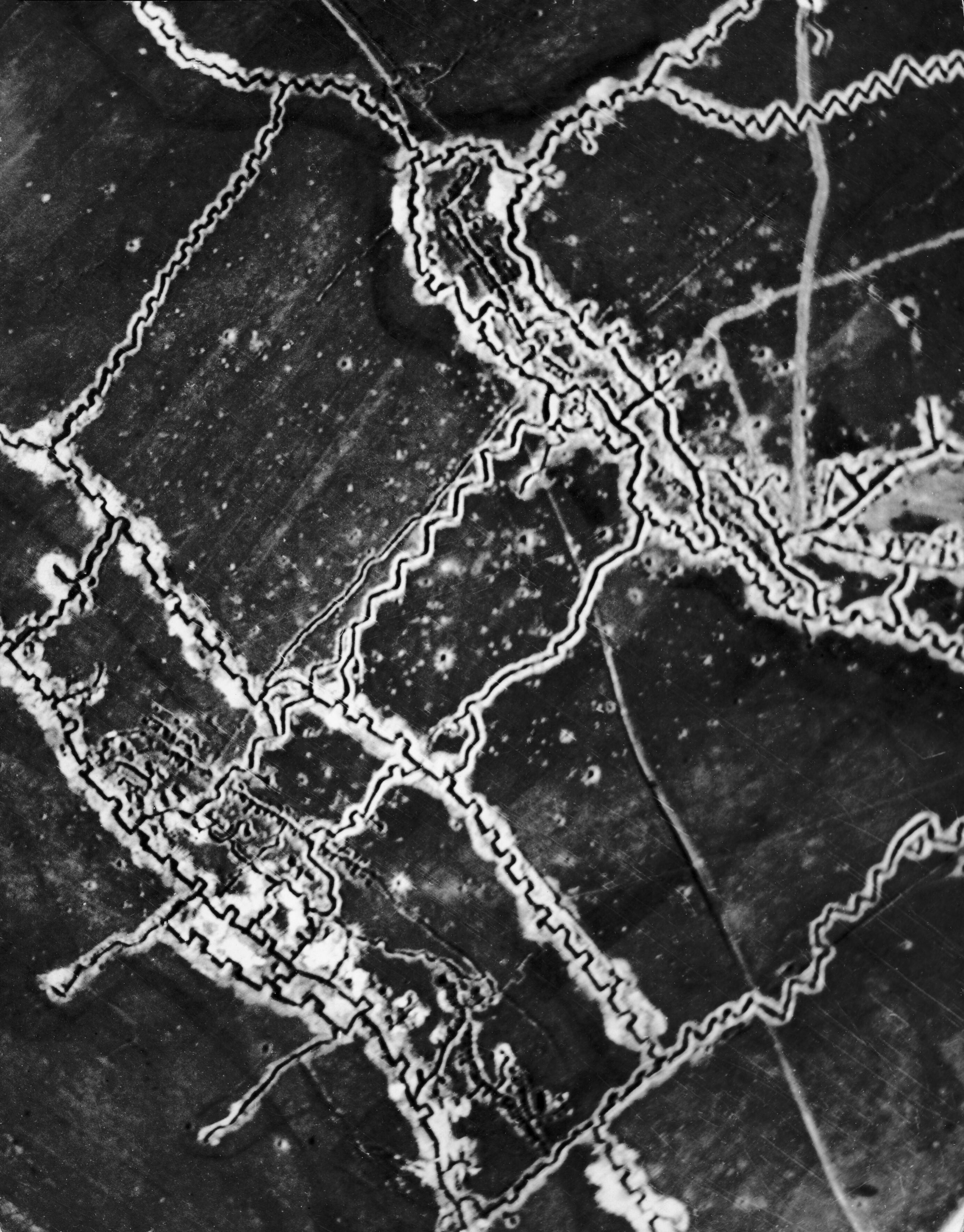
Aerial photograph of the Schwaben Redoubt (upper right) taken before the Battle of the Somme.

==== Somme ====
39th Division moved to the Somme sector in late August, and on 3 September it attacked along the River Ancre at Beaumont-Hamel, but again most of 118th Bde was not directly involved. For the next three weeks the division held a long section of the front line, carrying out active Trench warfare without attacking. It cooperated with the divisions that successfully attacked Thiepval on 26 September and the Schwaben Redoubt on 28 September during the Battle of Thiepval Ridge.

On 14 October, as part of the Battle of the Ancre Heights, the 39th Division made its own set-piece attack to complete the Capture of Schwaben Redoubt. The attack went in at 14.45, with two battalions of 118th Bde advancing over open ground towards the redoubt while 1/6th Cheshires extended the line on the left. By 23.00 the enemy had been thrown out of the last of the position and over 150 prisoners taken. Next day the Germans made three serious counter-attacks, two using Flamethrowers, but these were repulsed. On 21 October the division also completed the capture of the troublesome 'Stuff Trench'.

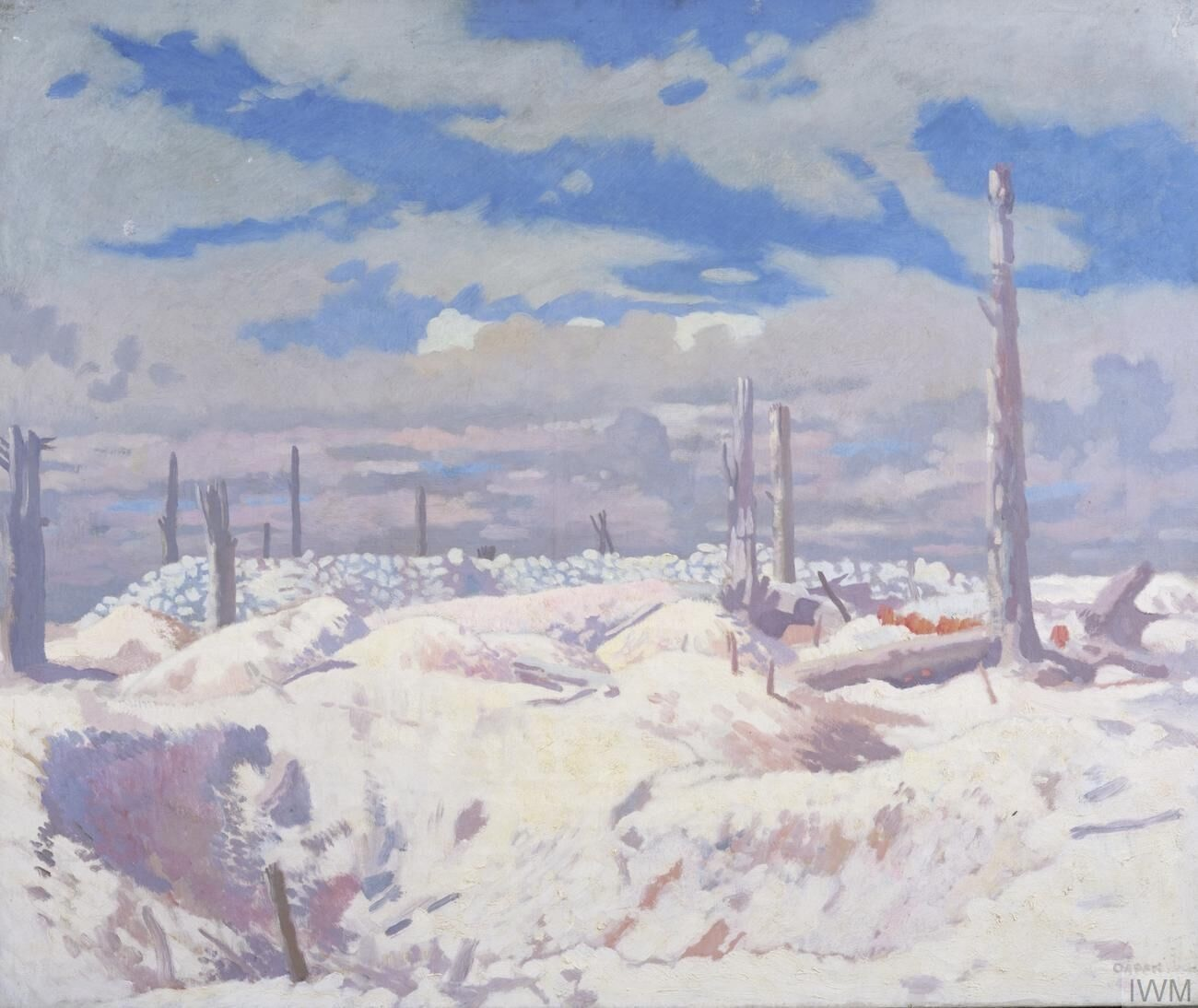
The Schwaben Redoubt, painted after the battle by Sir William Orpen.

39th Division had been understrength even when it moved to the Somme; by 10 November half of the officers and two-thirds of the other ranks in the average battalion in the division were reinforcements who had joined since 3 September. However, it took part in the last phase of the Somme Offensive, the Battle of the Ancre, on 13 November. Its purpose was to clear the Germans from the slope above the Ancre. 118th Brigade formed up in the dark and morning fog, clear of the Schwaben Reboubt behind jumping-off tapes laid by the Royal Engineers. But once the advance began the battalions found it difficult to keep up with the Creeping barrage through the litter of shattered trenches and lost direction in the fog. The adjutant of the 1/6th Cheshires had to go forward from battalion HQ to reorganise the battalion, and although it reached its objective, the Strasbourg Line, confused fighting went on against German machine gunners and snipers in the line. But 118th Brigade's attack had forced so many Germans out of their positions down into the Ancre Valley below St Pierre Divion that by 09.00 the neighbouring 117th Bde had more prisoners to deal with than it had men attacking. 1/6th Cheshires worked their way down Mill Trench to St Pierre Divion, which the battalion then put into a state of defence against the inevitable German counter-attacks. With assistance from the Royal Engineers and divisional pioneers the battalion established strongpoints in the river valley, with outposts at the mill and at Beaucourt Station. Although the German artillery barrage was heavy, the counter-attacks were feeble and the captured ground was successfully held. Shortly afterwards the onset of winter weather brought an end to the fighting on the Somme.

==== Ypres ====
In mid-November 1916 39th Division was relieved and marched north to the Ypres Salient, where after rest it took its turns in the front line, with its continuous trench warfare and raiding. This increased in intensity in April and May 1917 as preparations were made for a new attack (the Third Ypres Offensive).

The first phase of the offensive (the Battle of Pilckem Ridge) was launched at 03.50 on 31 July, with 118th Bde acting as divisional reserve. 39th Division took its first two objectives successfully, then 118th Bde went through at 10.10. Immediately after crossing the Zonnebeke–Langemarck road 1/6th Cheshires came under heavy machine gun fire from their right rear, where a neighbouring brigade had been delayed. Despite heavy losses, the battalion pressed on to the German Third Line west of Aviatik Farm on the Gravenstafel Ridge where a large number of Germans behind a mass of uncut barbed wire were holding up their hands in surrender. However, a major German counter-attack soon came in and the rest of 118th Bde could not hold their positions, leaving the left of 1/6th Cheshires exposed. Many of the surrendered Germans took the opportunity to pick up their weapons again, but the German artillery barrage fell on friend and foe alike. Losing heavily, the Cheshires gradually withdrew from the Third Line through drenching rain. At 22.00 that night 118th Bde was ordered back through the rest of the division to regroup in the original British starting line; its battalions had lost roughly 70 per cent of their attacking strength. The troops had to hold their positions as the rain turned the battlefield into a swamp. 39th Division was finally relieved on 6 August.

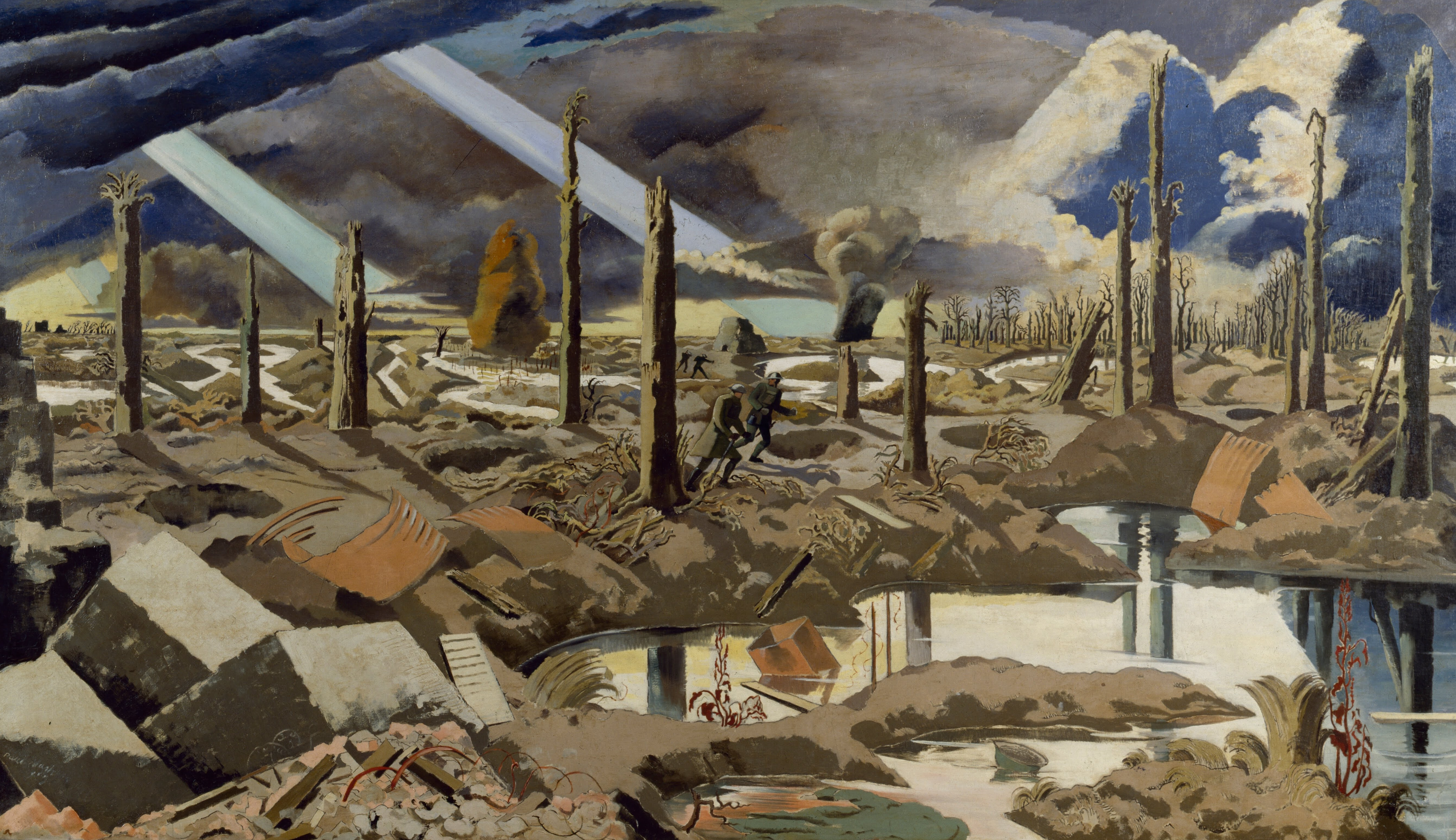
The Menin Road by Paul Nash depicts the devastated battlefield round the Tower Hamlets pillboxes on the Bassevillebeek Spur.

The division was back for the Battle of the Menin Road Ridge on 20 September when 117th Bde attacked, and the Battle of Polygon Wood on 26 September. This time the division had sidestepped northwards to make an attempt on the troublesome Tower Hamlets Ridge, but 118th Bde got stuck in the Bassevillebeek valley, where men had to pull each other out of the deep mud. The brigade lost its creeping barrage and was stopped short of its objective by machine guns and counter-attacks. 39th Division was pulled out for rest in mid-October.

==== Spring Offensive ====
39th Division was in reserve when the German spring offensive broke on 21 March 1918. The forward positions of 16th (Irish) Division were quickly overrun in the morning mist and the division forced to retreat. 39th Division came up in support and next day the two divisions held off no fewer than five mass attacks. On 23 March the mist helped the 16th and 39th Divisions slip away, as the 'Great Retreat' gathered pace. The divisions contested the crossings of the River Somme, 24–25 March, and fought in the Battle of Rosières on 26–27 March. As 118th Brigade retreated from the Rosières pocket south-east of Villers-Bretonneux the brigade commander was captured while supervising the rearguards. But the German offensive on this front had run out of impetus, and the retreat ended on 28 March. On 29 March the division took up position along the River Avre, where they held off the last enemy attacks. 39th Division's infantry were relieved on 30 March and transferred to the quiet Ypres sector.

By now 39th Division was so weak that on 10 April it was temporarily reduced to a single composite brigade in which 118th Bde formed No 4 Battalion and part of No 5 Battalion. When the Germans launched the next phase of their Spring Offensive against the Ypres front the composite brigade took part in the fighting on the Wytschaete Ridge on 16 April, the First and Second Battles of Kemmel Ridge on 17–19 and 25–26 April, and finally the Battle of the Scherpenberg on 29 April.

That was the last German attack on the Flanders Front. It was also the end of 39th Division's war. The shattered Composite Brigade was pulled out of the line and rejoined 39th Divisional HQ at Éperlecques. Most of its units were reduced to training cadres and employed in training US divisions. However, 6th Cheshires (the '1/' prefix had been dropped since the disbandment of the 2nd and 3rd Line battalions, see below) was transferred on 28 May to 75th Bde in 25th Division. This was a 'Kitchener's Army' formation in which three battalions of the Cheshires were already serving.

6th Cheshires joined 25th Division while it was engaged in the Third Battle of the Aisne under French Command. The division had fought through most of the Spring Offensive so far, and had been sent to hold the previously quiet Chemin des Dames ridge for a rest. Unfortunately, this was the sector chosen by the Germans for the next phase of their offensive, which opened with a massive artillery bombardment on 27 May. 25th Division had been sent forward from Army reserve and had been immediately outflanked and forced back; when 6th Cheshires officially joined next day, the British line had already gone back 8 miles (13 km), and the retreat continued. The German thrust finally ran out near Reims after the French had been reinforced by US troops.

On 17 June the 11th (Service) Battalion, Cheshire Regiment, in 75th Bde was reduced to a training cadre and 6th Cheshires absorbed 16 officers and 492 other ranks from it. Thus reinforced, the 6th Cheshires formed No 3 Battalion in 25th Division Composite Brigade, which on 22 June was sent to reinforce 50th (Northumbrian) Division while the training cadres of 25th Division returned to England. Together, the 25th and 50th Division Composite Brigades formed 'Jackson's Force' under Maj-Gen H.C. Jackson of 50th (N) Division. This force returned to the BEF, moving northwards behind the British front. While 50th (N) Division went to Dieppe to reform, 25th Division Composite Brigade was broken up on 7 July. Next day 6th Cheshires joined 21st Bde in 30th Division, which was being reconstituted after its own losses in the Spring Offensive. This ended the battalion's wanderings: it would serve in 21st Bde until the end of the war.

==== Hundred Days Offensive ====
The Allied Hundred Days Offensive began in August 1918. The rebuilt 30th Division took part in the capture of Wulverghem 2 September. All the Allied armies carried out a coordinated series of offensives at the end of September. 30th Division's role in Second Army's attack in the Ypres sector on 28 September (the Fifth Battle of Ypres) was to watch out for the enemy to weaken on its front and follow up any opportunities. However, it was dark before it could effectively exploit the German retirement. The advance continued next day in some confusion to Warneton and the Comines Canal, 21st Bde moving up in reserve.

Second Army launched the Battle of Courtrai on 14 October. 30th Division advanced towards Bousbecque and 21st Bde had seized its objectives by 07.30 and sent patrols into Wervicq. Next day Second Army began crossing the River Lys and in the afternoon two companies of 6th Cheshires forced a passage over the river south of Wervicq. By 20.30 they were just short of the crest of the hills beyond. 21st Brigade was relieved on 16 October.

The advance continued, and by 20 October 30th Division was advancing on a broad front with 21st Bde back in the line. The brigade ran into resistance on the Ruddervoorde Spur, and though it pushed in the outposts there was a strongly-wired position behind on the St Genois Spur (part of the Courtrai Switch trench line). The ground between the spurs was swept by German artillery fire and 21st Bde was halted, which stopped the whole divisional advance. However, 21st Bde gained some ground by making a charge after dark. Next day 30th Division was ordered to clear the enemy from the west bank of the River Scheldt, and 21st Bde reached the top of the St Genois Spur by 11.00. After halting along the railway line, the brigade then pushed on to its objective along the Helchin–Bossuyt road parallel with and close to the Scheldt.. However, without artillery it was unable to take Bossuyt with its outlying chateau and park.

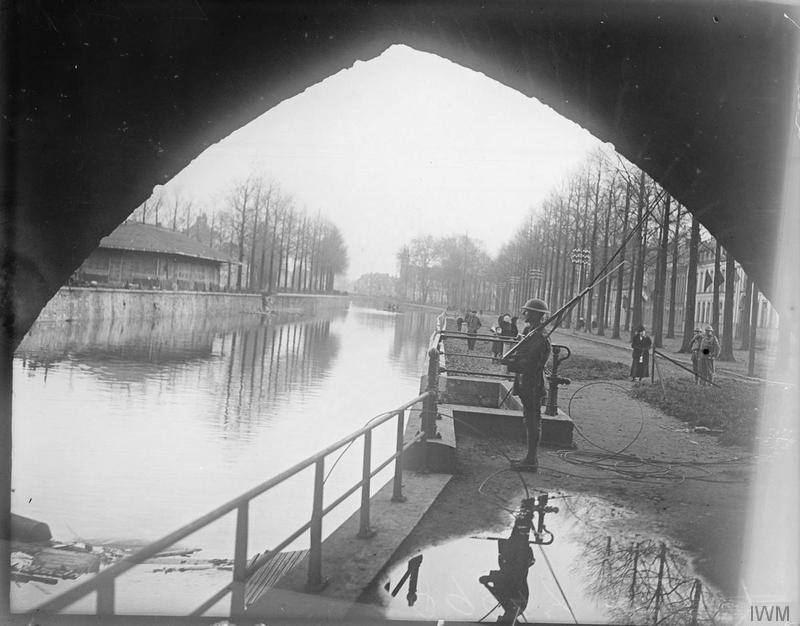
A sentry of 30th Division at a bridge over the Scheldt at Tournai, 9 November 1918.

The Germans resisted all attempts to cross the Scheldt until 8 November when they began to withdraw; patrols went across during the night and the advance guards made rapid progress on 9 November. 30th Division continued to advance until it confronted the German rearguards at Flobecq on 10 November. Next day the Allied cavalry passed through its lines in pursuit and hostilities ended when the Armistice with Germany came into force at 11.00.

After the Armistice 30th Division was moved back into France where it was detailed for duty at the base ports. From the beginning of 1919 it was working at Dunkirk, Calais, Boulogne and Étaples. Demobilisation gathered pace and units began to return to the UK in May. The division ceased to exist on 1 September 1919 and 6th Cheshires was disembodied on 15 November 1919

=== 2/6th Cheshires ===
The 2nd Line battalion (2/6th Cheshires) was formed on 7 September 1914 at Stockport and in November it replaced the 1/6th Bn in the Cheshire Brigade. However, although the 2nd Line units were uniformed and partly equipped, they were still unarmed. Before 53rd (Welsh) Division was sent overseas the unarmed 2nd Line were replaced by other TF battalions in April 1915. The 2/6th Cheshires were then assigned to the 2/1st Cheshire Bde in the 2nd Welsh Division, later designated 204th (2/1st Cheshire) Bde and 68th (2nd Welsh) Division respectively. The division was concentrating at Northampton, but lack of equipment made organisation and training of the 2nd Line units a slow process. Continuity of training was disrupted by the need to send drafts to the 1st Line units, and by the decision to transfer the Home Service men to home defence units. The 68th (2nd W) Division took over the 53rd's camps round Bedford, but still only had old .256-in Japanese Ariska rifles with which to train until late 1915 when the men received old Magazine Lee-Enfield rifles converted to charger-loading.

Not all the TF county regiments were equally successful in raising recruits: in November the strength of a 2nd Line battalion was reduced to 660 (any surplus being transferred to the draft-finding 3rd Line), but on 22 November 1915 the 2/6th Cheshires absorbed the less successful 2/5th Bn Welsh Regiment. The division was assigned to First Army (Home Forces) of Central Force in November 1915 and then by September 1916 to General Reserve, Home Forces. At this time 204th Bde was quartered round Old Warden in Bedfordshire and Lowestoft in Suffolk. Next year the division moved to Northern Army (Home Forces) with 204th Bde scattered around Suffolk. It was now obvious that 68th (2nd W) Division was never going to be ready for overseas service, and the 2nd Line TF infantry battalions began to be replaced by training units. The 2/6th Cheshires disbanded on 11 September 1917 at Southwold.

=== 3/6th Cheshires ===
The 3/6th Battalion Cheshire Regiment was formed at Stockport on 11 March 1915 and moved to Oswestry. It became the 6th Reserve Bn, Cheshire Regiment, on 8 April 1916 and was absorbed into the 4th Reserve Bn on 1 September 1916.

== Postwar ==
When the TF was reformed on 7 February 1920 the 6th Battalion Cheshire Regiment was amalgamated with the Cheshire Brigade of the Royal Field Artillery and the Shropshire Royal Horse Artillery to form a new 6th Cheshire & Shropshire Medium Brigade of the Royal Garrison Artillery. The new unit based its HQ and two of its batteries at the Stockport Armoury. In the 1930s it became a heavy anti-aircraft regiment, which served in the Middle East in World War II. Despite numerous postwar amalgamations, one battery remained at Stockport until 1967.

A new 6th Battalion, Cheshire Regiment, was formed as a duplicate of the 7th Bn just before the outbreak of World War II in 1939. It served as a machine gun battalion in North Africa and Italy.

== Uniforms ==
The uniform of the 4th Admin Battalion was scarlet with buff facings. The facing colour of the 4th Volunteer Battalion was changed from buff to white in 1889 to match the Regular battalions of the regiment, which had been forced to change under the 1881 reforms. However, the whole regiment regained its buff facings in 1904.

== Honorary Colonel ==
The following served as Honorary Colonel of the battalion:

- Lt-Gen Sir Harry Jones, GCB, appointed 5 April 1861, died 4 August 1866
- Lt-Col William Legh, later 1st Lord Newton, former CO, appointed 25 January 1873, died 15 December 1898
- Lt-Col Walter P. Carrington, former CO, appointed 28 November 1902
- Brig-Gen A.E. Ommanney, CB, former commander of the Cheshire Brigade, appointed 22 July 1911

== Memorials ==
There is a memorial tablet to the 6th Battalion, Cheshire Regiment, in the Memorial Gallery of Stockport Art Gallery. Carved and lettered in the form of a Regimental Colour (with the numeral 'VI' in the canton) it carries all the Battle honours of the Cheshire Regiment rather than those specific to the battalion. A brass plate memorial is in the Stockport Armoury TA Centre.

The battalion's colours were laid up for safekeeping in St George's Church, Stockport, during World War I; they were then taken to France and carried in the Allied Peace Procession on 14 July 1919. They were returned to the UK on 12 September 1919 and permanently laid up in the church on 26 July 1925.

The World War I memorial to the whole of the Cheshire Regiment is in the Regimental Chapel in Chester Cathedral.

== External sources ==
- Mark Conrad, The British Army, 1914 (archive site)
- The Drill Hall Project
- Great War Centenary Drill Halls
- Imperial War Museum, War Memorials Register
- The Long, Long Trail
- Museum of the Mercian Regiment
