= Wervik =

Municipality in Flemish Community, Belgium

- City and municipality
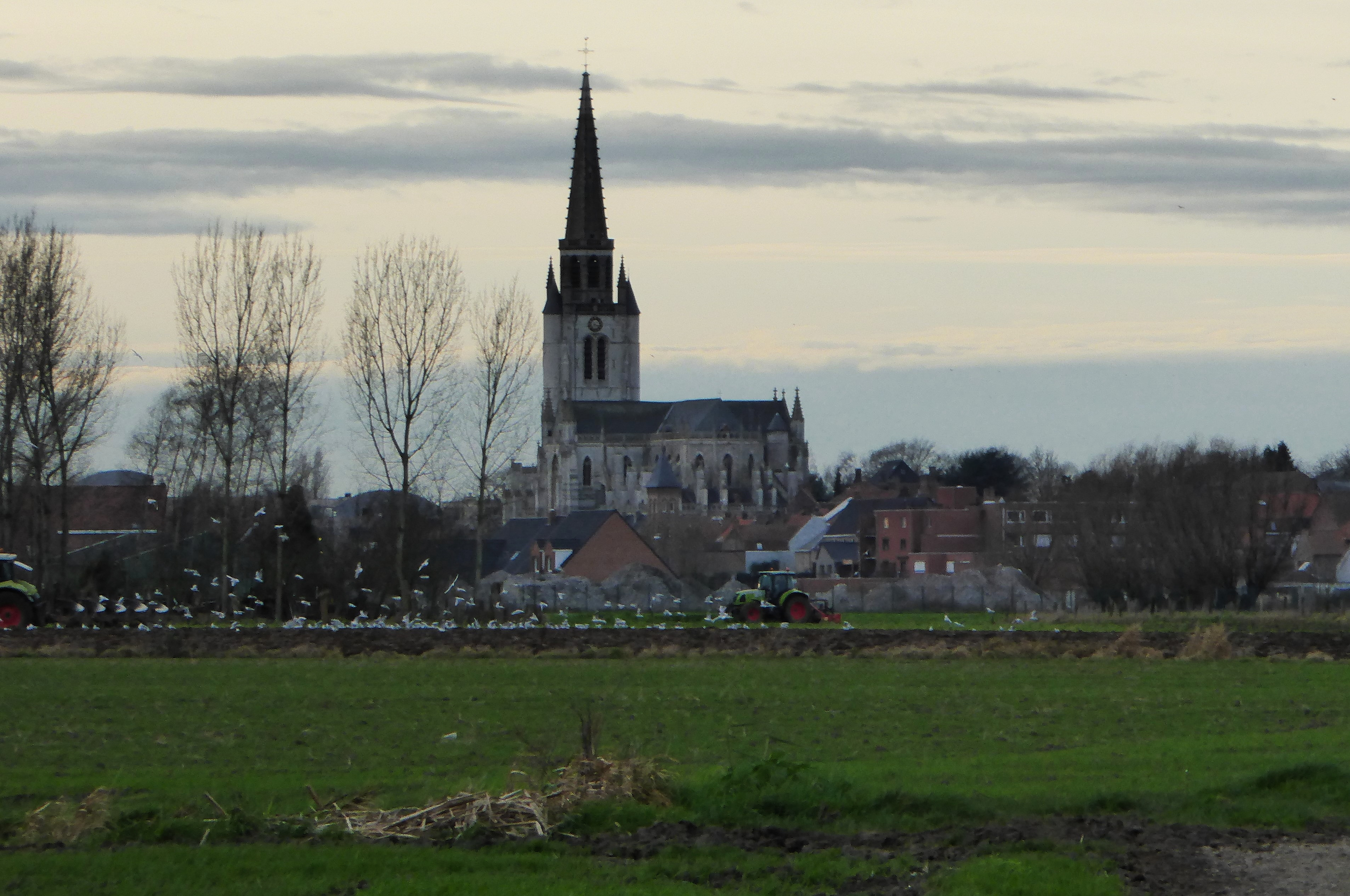

- Flag Coat of arms

- Location of Wervik in West Flanders
- Interactive map of Wervik
- Location in Belgium
- Coordinates: 50°47′N 03°02′E
- Country: Belgium
- Community: Flemish Community
- Region: Flemish Region
- Province: West Flanders
- Arrondissement: Ypres

Government
  - Mayor: Youro Casier (sp.a)
  - Governing parties: sp.a, OpenVLD-Groen-PP

Area
  - Total: 43.77 km^{2} (16.90 sq mi)

Population (2022-01-01)
  - Total: 19,020
  - Density: 434.5/km^{2} (1,125/sq mi)
- Postal codes: 8940
- NIS code: 33029
- Area codes: 056
- Website: www.wervik.be

Wervik (Dutch: [ˈʋɛrvɪk]; French: Wervicq [wɛʁvik]; West Flemish: Wervik [ˈβærvɛk]; Latin: Viroviacum) is a city and municipality located in the Belgian province of West Flanders. The municipality comprises the city of Wervik and the town of Geluwe. On January 1, 2014, Wervik had a total population of 18,435. The total area is 43.61 km^{2} (16¾ sq. mi.) which gives a population density of 423 inhabitants per km^{2} (1095 per sq. mi.). The area is famous for its excellent tobacco and has a tobacco museum. The town is separated from its French counterpart Wervicq-Sud by the river Lys.

== History ==
Wervik is one of the oldest towns in Belgium.

=== Prehistory ===
Stone Age artefacts, flint axes and spearheads, were found in the district of Bas-Flanders and the site Oosthove. The archeological excavations at de Pioneer in 2009 yielded traces of inhabitation from the Iron Age to the Roman Period.

=== Roman period ===
Wervik was probably a settlement of the Menapians led by the chief Virovos, at a small height along the banks of the Lys (current Island Balokken). This is still unproven. At the time of the conquest of Gaul by Caesar, a Roman stopping place was built next to the Celtic village. The Roman settlement was registered on Roman road maps from the 3rd to 4th century under the name Viroviacum (Itinerarium Antonini) or Virovino (map of Peutinger). Viroviacum was located on the Roman road between Cassel and Bavay. Remains from that period are still being found regularly in Wervik. Excavations at Saint Martin's Square in the centre exposed the foundations of the old Saint Martin's church, which was partly built with Roman waste materials. According to some historians this was formerly a temple dedicated to Mars or Priapus. This is still unproven.

=== Middle Ages ===
In the 13th century the population of Belgium rose sharply, thanks to the great heyday of the textile trade which penetrated international markets up to the Far East. In 1327 the city was taken by Philip of Valois and partially destroyed.

During the Ghent uprising of 1382, Wervik was an outpost of the army of Philip van Artevelde during the Battle of Westrozebeke. The rebellion failed, and the city was plundered by the Bretons and reduced to ashes. The Saint Medardus church had to be rebuilt completely. Wervik had not yet fully recovered when a major fire in 1400 destroyed the whole town again. Of the 820 dwellings there only 20 remained. Jan Zonder Vrees gave Wervik a market hall in 1401, as an incentive for recovery and revival. In 1436 part of the garrison of Calais invaded Wervik and again burnt the town to ashes, in 1440 the town was burnt again. The many successive fires were mainly because most houses were built of wood and straw, and that the town had no protection against attacks as it was never walled. After the succession of fires the town was attacked by the plague. In the years 1436 and 1468 the population was decimated by the epidemic.

=== Habsburg Netherlands ===
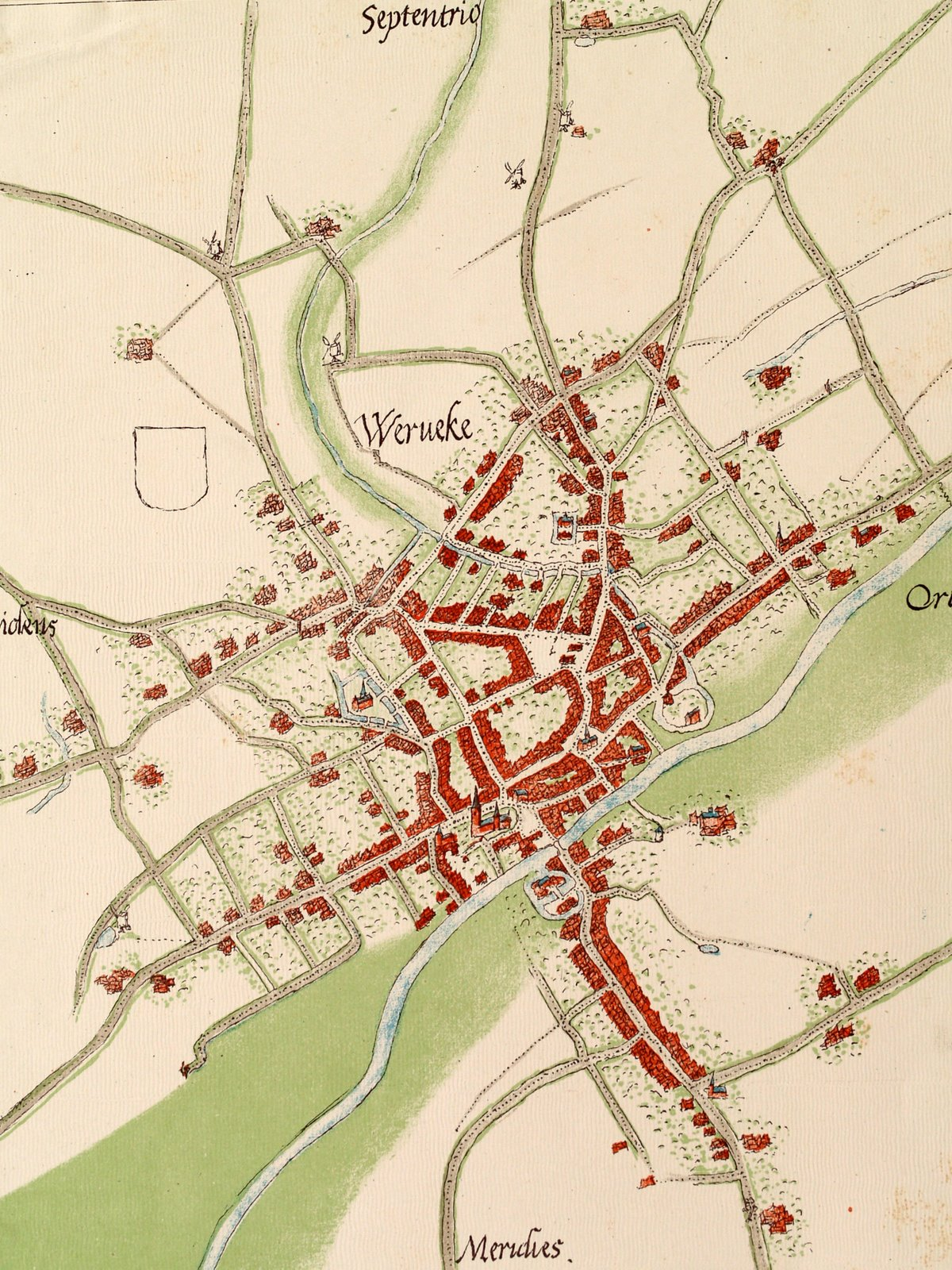
unified Wervik on Deveter map

In the middle of the 16th century finally a quieter period began for Wervik. Prosperity had vanished and the population had dropped to about 3000 inhabitants. During the religious quarrels, the Saint Medardus church was badly damaged and today still bears the traces of the iconoclastic. The Geuzen burnt the church in 1579.

In the 17th century the entire region was affected by the ongoing annexation attempts of the French king Louis XIV. Wervik was taken by the French in 1668 and was later annexed to the Spanish crown in 1678. After the Peace of Nijmegen treaty in that year, Wervik became French territory again. The continuous impoverishment of the town left it with only 3172 inhabitants.

In 1713 the town was divided in half by the Treaty of Utrecht. The river Lys was the state border and separated the town into French Wervicq-Sud and Austrian Wervik. But for the population the town remained whole, and the Saint Medardus church remained the parish church for both town parts.

=== First French Republic ===
After the French Revolution and the French invasion of 1794, the Saint Medardus church was again turned into ashes. During the War of the First Coalition the battle of Wervik and Menin partly took place here between the Dutch and French revolutionary armies, during which the young Prince Frederick of Orange-Nassau was wounded. Wervik became part of the French département of Lys, and entered a period of terror, coercion and persecution.

=== Kingdom of Belgium ===
After the Congress of Vienna in 1815, the town became part of the United Kingdom of the Netherlands until the Belgian Revolution in 1830. After the Belgian Revolution locals of the towns Wervicq-Sud, Bousbecque, Comines and Warneton protested and demanded a reunification with their Belgian counterparts on the other side of the Lys. This small uprising was put down after a few days by French Gendarmes.

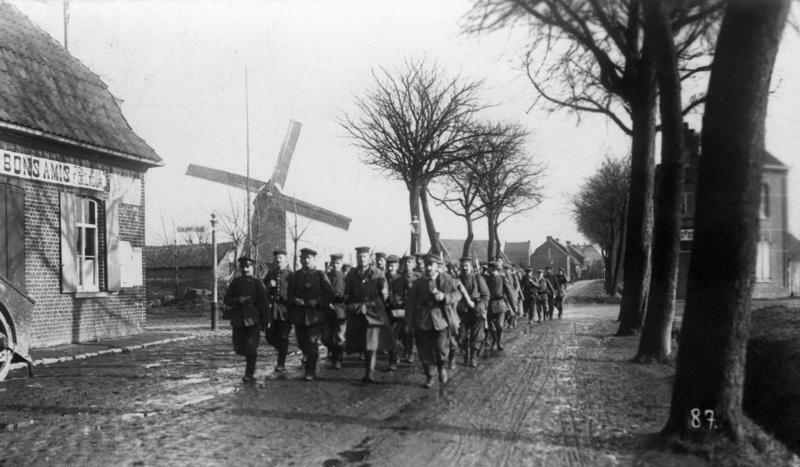
Germans coming from Wervik marching to the front

During World War I German troops entered the town on October 5, 1914. A customs officer had noticed German Uhlans in Zuid-Wervik on October 4, and turned the swing bridge between Wervik and Zuid-Wervik open so that no one could cross it, throwing the key in the Lys. The next day more Germans had arrived and fished out the key. After a short fight with the Gendarmerie (both French and Belgian), the town was conquered by the Germans. Because Wervik was the first major town under German control just outside the Western Front, it got a military government and German soldiers were billeted there, and wounded soldiers cared for (including at one time the young Adolf Hitler). Wervik's population was forced to work in German operated factories serving the trench warfare. In 1917 the population had to evacuate the town because British guns were aimed at Wervik and ruined the town.

Wervik was largely rebuilt after the war. The Bruges architect Huib Hoste carried out several projects, including several rows of houses, commercial buildings and the town sewers.

During the Second World War Wervik was again occupied by German troops, until the inhabitants were freed in 1944 by Canadian soldiers.

== Sights ==
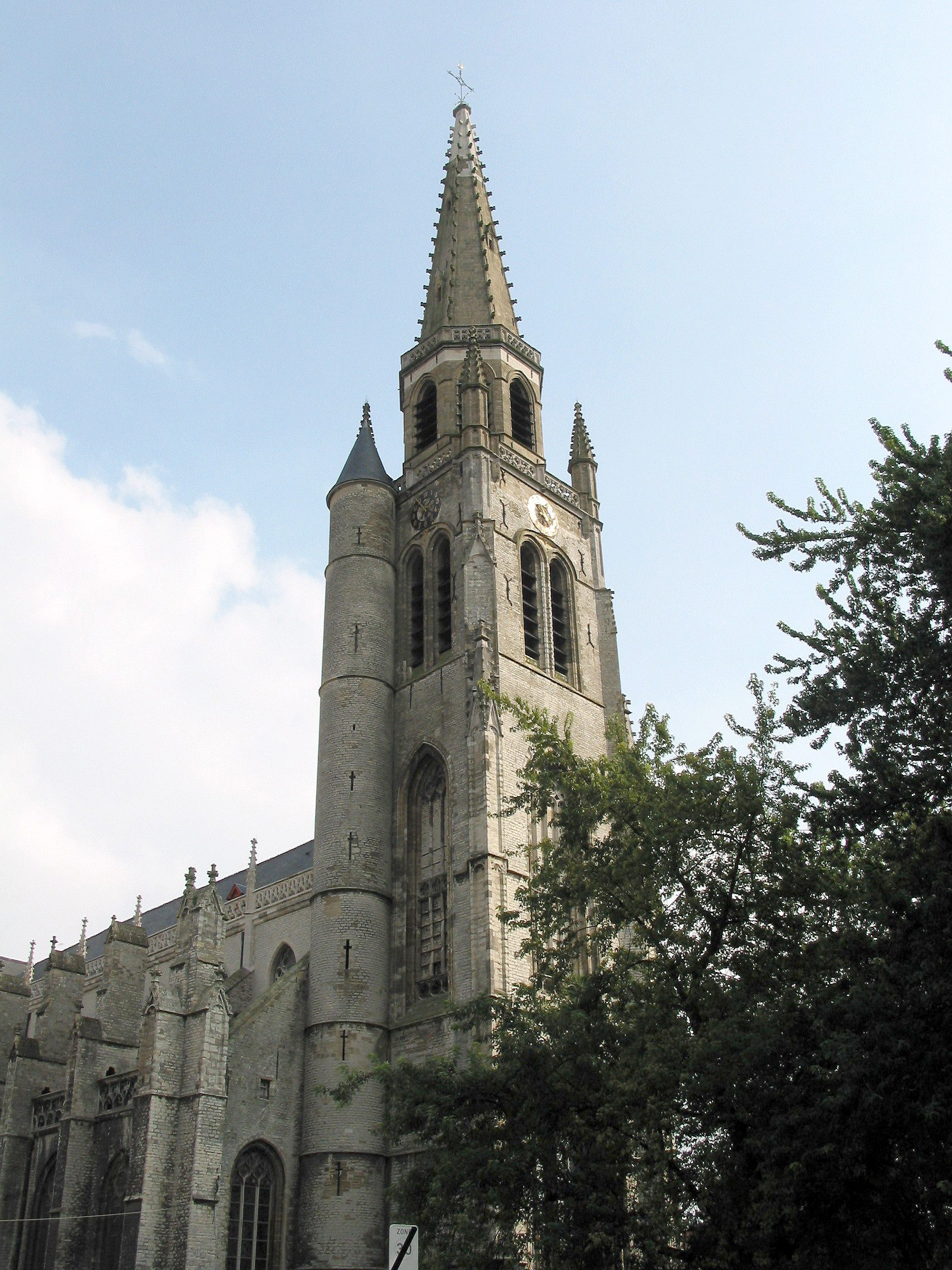
Saint Medardus church

- The Saint-Medardus church is a massive gothic church.
- National tobacco museum - the region of Wervik is known for its tobacco farms.

== Notable people ==
- Yves Leterme, Prime Minister of Belgium
- Wim Delvoye, artist
- Ronny Coutteure, actor
- Joseph Demuysere, cyclist, winner of Milan–San Remo
- Sam Bennett, cyclist, Irish National Champion 2019
- Gaston Durnez, journalist and writer
