= Wervicq-Sud =

- Commune
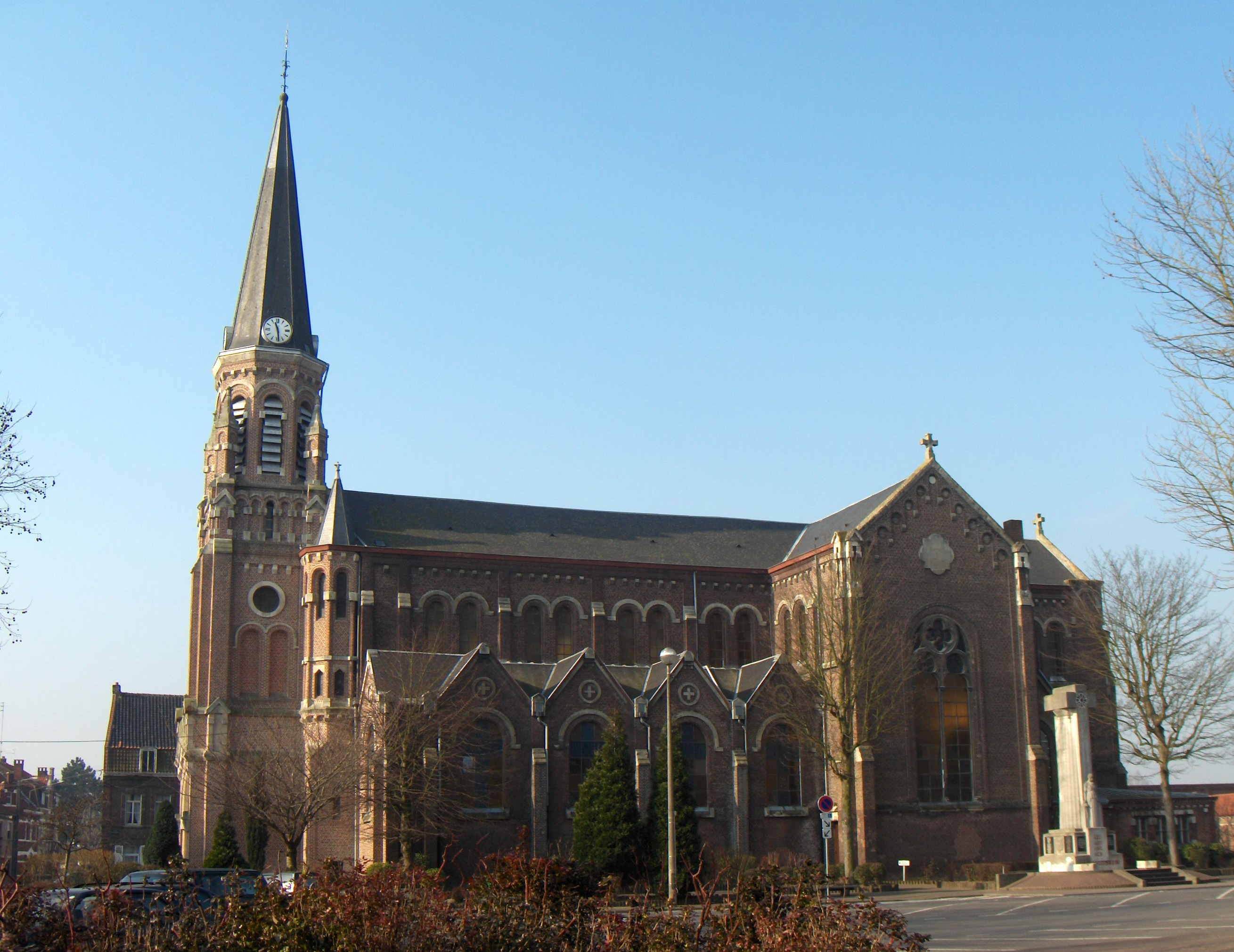
- The church in Wervicq-Sud

- Coat of arms
- Location of Wervicq-Sud
- Location within France Location within Hauts-de-France
- Coordinates: 50°46′23″N 3°02′55″E
- Country: France
- Region: Hauts-de-France
- Department: Nord
- Arrondissement: Lille
- Canton: Lambersart
- Intercommunality: Métropole Européenne de Lille

Government
  - Mayor (2020–2026): David Heiremans
- Area^{1}: 5.09 km^{2} (1.97 sq mi)
- Elevation: 15 m (49 ft)
- Highest elevation: 58 m (190 ft)
- Lowest elevation: 12 m (39 ft)
- Population (2023): 5,426
  - Density: 1,070/km^{2} (2,760/sq mi)
- Time zone: UTC+01:00 (CET)
  - Summer (DST): UTC+02:00 (CEST)
- INSEE/Postal code: 59656 /59117
- ^{1} French Land Register data, which excludes lakes, ponds, glaciers > 1 km^{2} (0.386 sq mi or 247 acres) and river estuaries.

Wervicq-Sud (French pronunciation: [wɛʁvik syd]; Dutch: Zuid-Wervik) is a commune in the Nord department of northern France, near the border with Belgium. Wervicq-Sud is one of the oldest villages still existent, dating back to Roman times.

The town is separated from its Belgian Flemish sister town of Wervik by the river Lys.

Located 15 km north of Lille and 20 km south of Ypres.

== Bounding communes ==
- Comines, west
- Bousbecque, east
- Linselles, south

== History ==
The name appears in the form Viroviacum in the Antonine Itinerary and the Peutinger map of settlements in the 3rd century. It was here that the Roman road from Tournai to Cassel crossed the Lys (a tributary of the Scheldt). It had a fortified post, of which traces are still visible. It was mentioned by Sanderus in his "Flandria illustrata" in the sixteenth century.

For centuries, Werviq-Sud and Wervik were one unified settlement and belonged to the County of Flanders, an autonomous but tributary principality to French kings. In 1527 by the Treaty of Madrid it passed under the suzerainty of the Spanish empire. The town was during the sixteenth century the main centre of tobacco production in Europe. It remained dependent on Spain until Louis XIV's conquest in 1667. Subsequently the town passed on to Austrian Empire then back to French.

It wasn't until 1713 that Werviq-Sud was finally separated from Wervik when the Treaty of Utrecht led to the river Lys becoming a border splitting the French and Austrian territories in this area. The town's right (south) bank become a part of the Nord department under the name Wervicq-Sud in 1790.

There was a small uprising here after the 1830 Belgian Revolution. Locals, together with those in nearby Bousbecque and a small number from Comines, demanded reunification with their Belgian counterparts on the other side of the Lys. This ended after an intervention of the Gendarmes.

During World War I the town was occupied by the Germans. In World War II it was integrated into the Military Administration in Belgium and Northern France and reunited with its Belgian counterpart Wervik.

=== Heraldry ===
Arms of Wervicq-Sud	The arms of Wervicq-Sud are blazoned : Or, a bend between 6 cinqfoils in orle gules.

== Population ==
Historical population
Year	Pop.	±% p.a.
1968	3,114	—
1975	3,991	+3.61%
1982	4,163	+0.60%
1990	4,328	+0.49%
1999	4,288	−0.10%
2007	4,698	+1.15%
2012	5,005	+1.27%
2017	5,413	+1.58%
2023	5,426	+0.04%
Source: INSEE

== Economy ==
Numerous associations located on a local way. Its main activity varies predominantly on textiles.

== Points of interests ==
- 't Wit Kasteel, a Château under communal property
- The area of La Montagne with its old property of Dalle-Dumont, a communal property covering 13 hectares and made up of three parts:
  - The East: A public garden
  - The Center: An enclosed agricultural pastures with a small bay and favorable to its walkway
  - The West: By the woods, covers a space of 8 hectares and features a German monuments featuring a few military graves dating from World War I. It also features several types of trees and plants.

== See also ==
- Communes of the Nord department

== Gallery ==
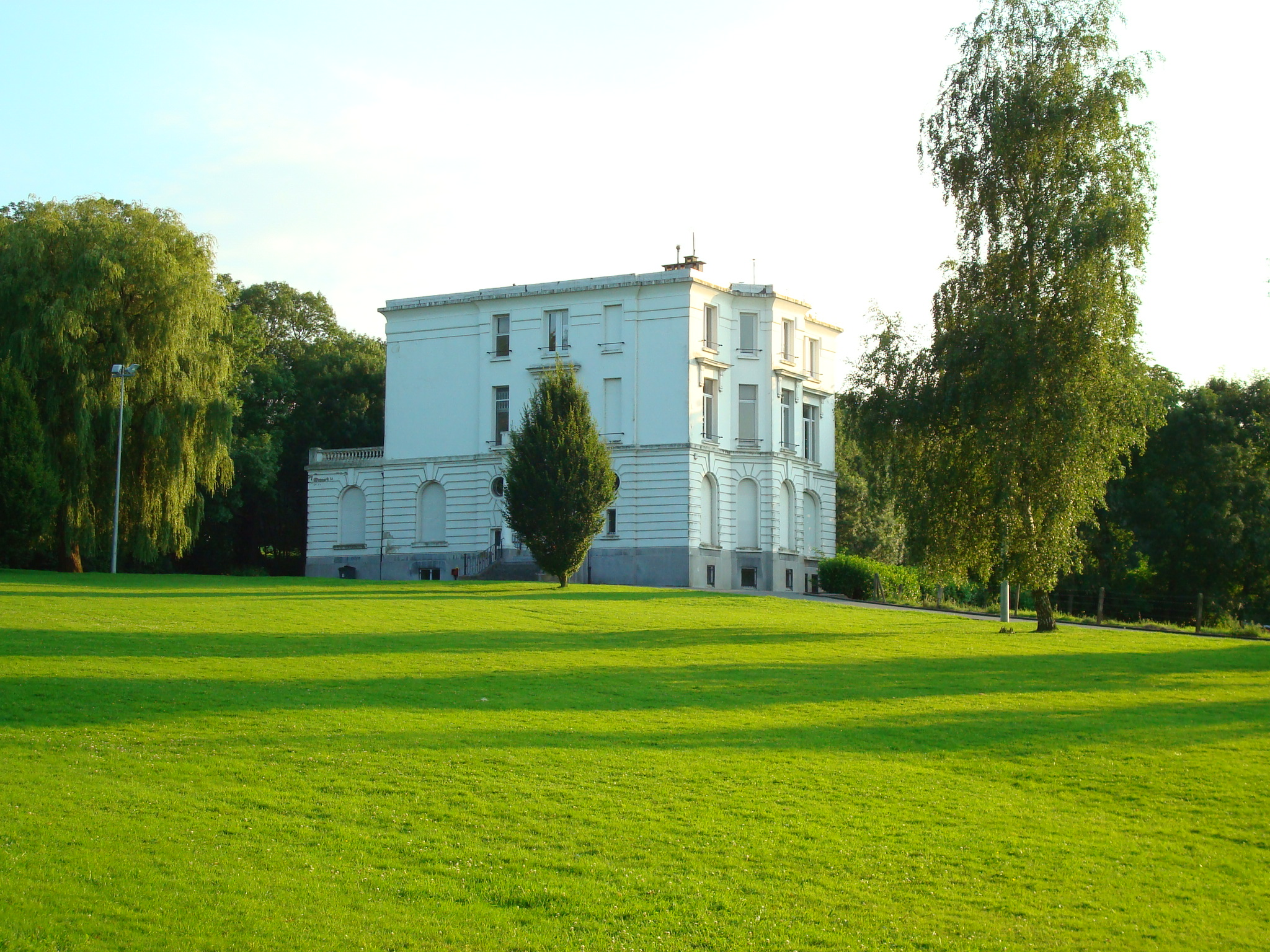
't Wit Kasteel

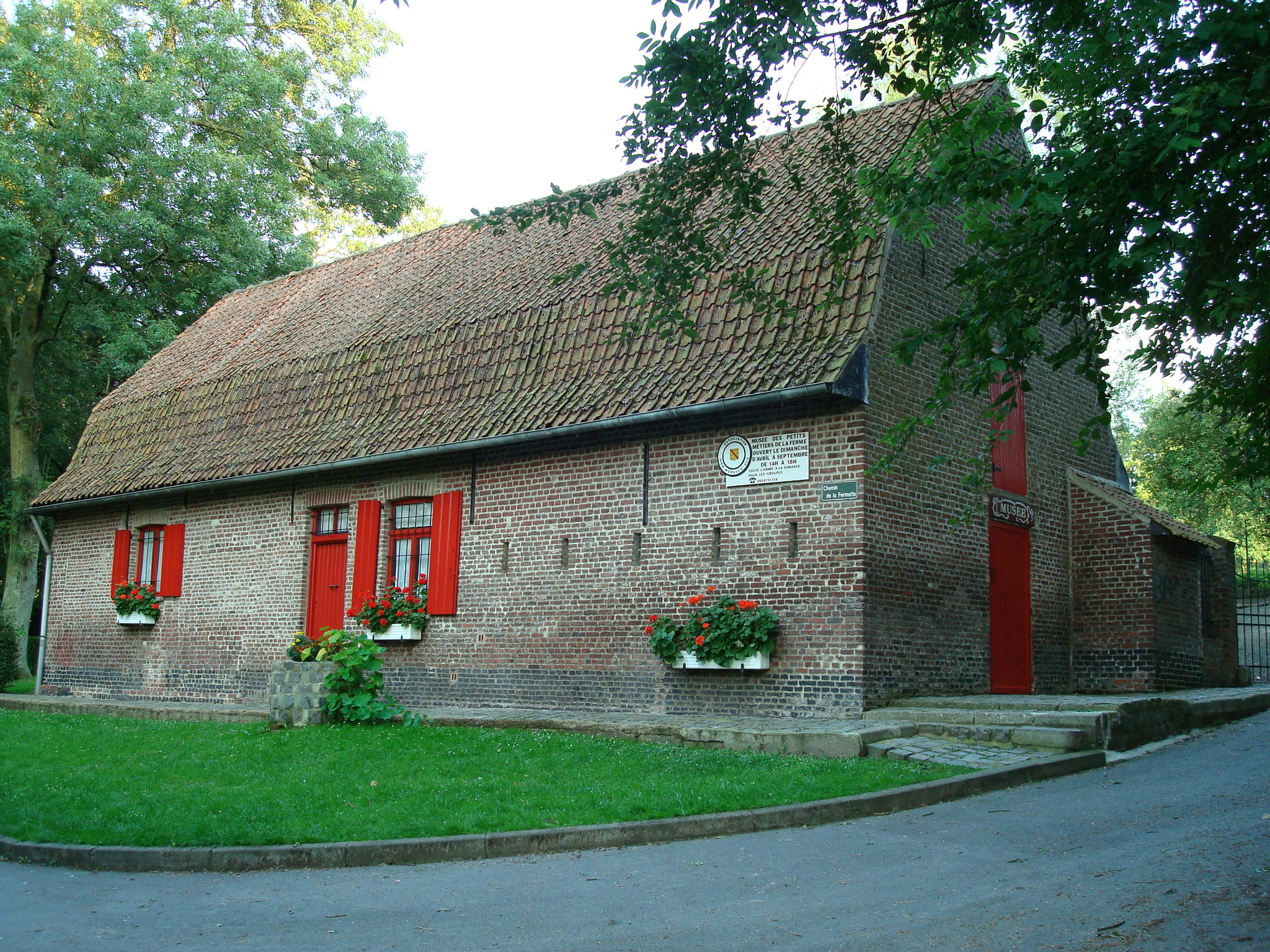
Agricultural museum
