= Canton of Lambersart =

Coordinates: 50.65°N 3.03°E

The canton of Lambersart is an administrative division of the Nord department, northern France. It was created at the French canton reorganisation which came into effect in March 2015. Its seat is in Lambersart.

It consists of the following communes:

1. Bousbecque
2. Comines
3. Lambersart
4. Linselles
5. Lompret
6. Quesnoy-sur-Deûle
7. Verlinghem
8. Wervicq-Sud
