= Verlinghem =

- Commune
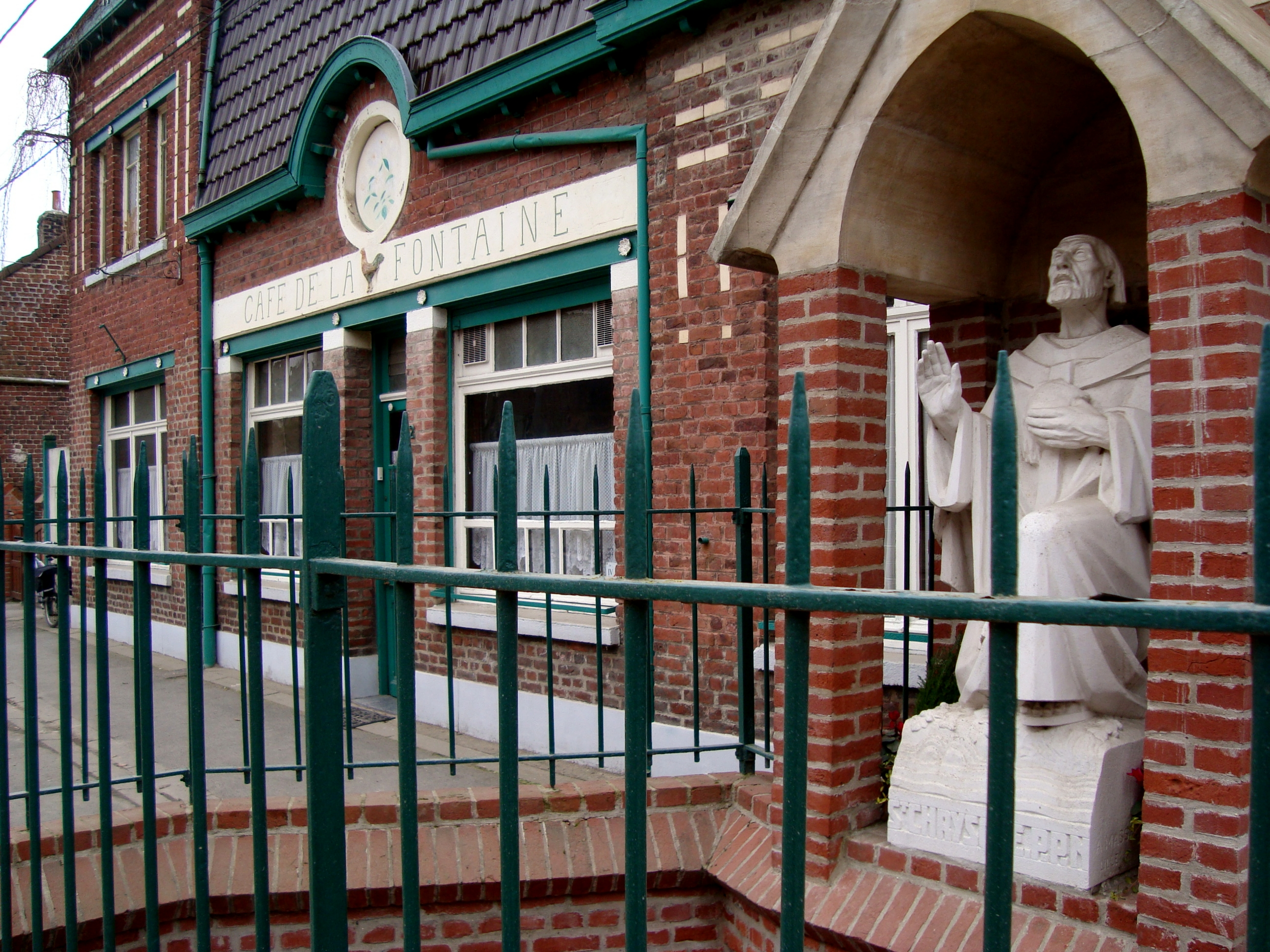
- The Saint-Chrysole fountain in Verlinghem

- Coat of arms
- Location of Verlinghem
- Location within France Location within Hauts-de-France
- Coordinates: 50°40′57″N 2°59′50″E
- Country: France
- Region: Hauts-de-France
- Department: Nord
- Arrondissement: Lille
- Canton: Lambersart
- Intercommunality: Métropole Européenne de Lille

Government
  - Mayor (2020–2026): Thierry Bonte
- Area^{1}: 10.08 km^{2} (3.89 sq mi)
- Elevation: 29 m (95 ft)
- Highest elevation: 34 m (112 ft)
- Lowest elevation: 12 m (39 ft)
- Population (2023): 2,682
  - Density: 266.1/km^{2} (689.1/sq mi)
- Time zone: UTC+01:00 (CET)
  - Summer (DST): UTC+02:00 (CEST)
- INSEE/Postal code: 59611 /59237
- ^{1} French Land Register data, which excludes lakes, ponds, glaciers > 1 km^{2} (0.386 sq mi or 247 acres) and river estuaries.

Verlinghem (French pronunciation: [vɛʁlɛ̃ɡɛm]; Dutch: Everlingem) is a commune in the Nord department in northern France. It is part of the Métropole Européenne de Lille.

== Population ==
Historical population
Year	Pop.	±% p.a.
1968	1,363	—
1975	1,729	+3.46%
1982	1,941	+1.67%
1990	2,182	+1.47%
1999	2,377	+0.96%
2007	2,303	−0.39%
2012	2,330	+0.23%
2017	2,460	+1.09%
2023	2,682	+1.45%
Source: INSEE

== Heraldry ==
Arms of Verlinghem	The arms of Verlinghem are blazoned : Quarterly 1&4: Argent, a lion gules, armed and langued azure, crowned Or; 2&3: Gules, a mullet of 16 argent.

== See also ==
- Communes of the Nord department
