= Rieux-en-Cambrésis =

- Commune
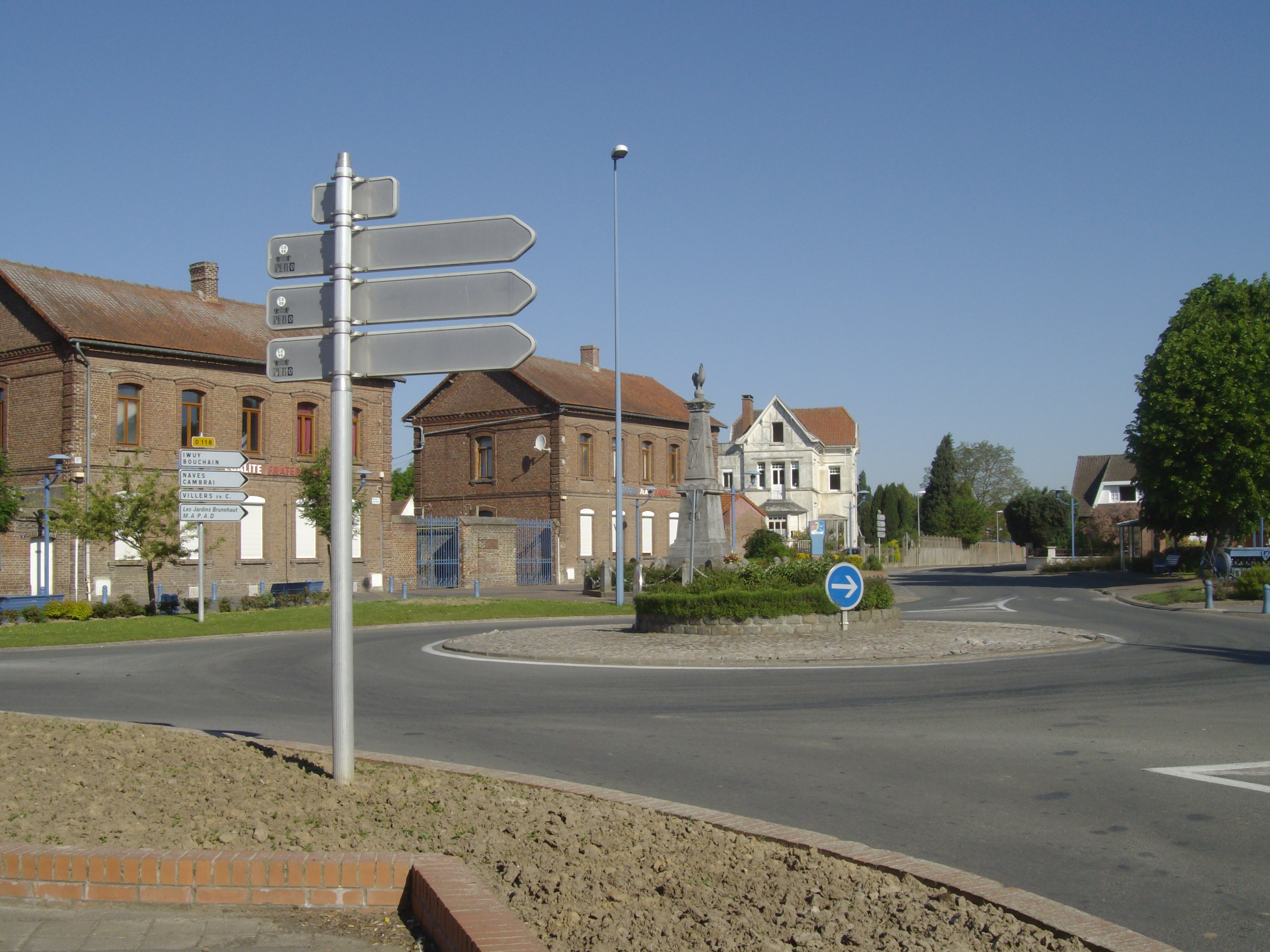
- A view within Rieux-en-Cambrésis

- Coat of arms
- Location of Rieux-en-Cambrésis
- Location within France Location within Hauts-de-France
- Coordinates: 50°12′06″N 3°21′12″E
- Country: France
- Region: Hauts-de-France
- Department: Nord
- Arrondissement: Cambrai
- Canton: Caudry
- Intercommunality: CA Cambrai

Government
  - Mayor (2020–2026): Michel Moussi
- Area^{1}: 7.66 km^{2} (2.96 sq mi)
- Elevation: 63 m (207 ft)
- Highest elevation: 87 m (285 ft)
- Lowest elevation: 43 m (141 ft)
- Population (2023): 1,425
  - Density: 186/km^{2} (482/sq mi)
- Time zone: UTC+01:00 (CET)
  - Summer (DST): UTC+02:00 (CEST)
- INSEE/Postal code: 59502 /59277
- ^{1} French Land Register data, which excludes lakes, ponds, glaciers > 1 km^{2} (0.386 sq mi or 247 acres) and river estuaries.

Rieux-en-Cambrésis (before 1962: Rieux) is a commune in the Nord department in northern France.

== Heraldry ==
Arms of Rieux-en-Cambrésis	The arms of Rieux-en-Cambrésis are blazoned : Argent, a fess sable. (Linselles and Rieux-en-Cambrésis use the same arms.)

== See also ==
- Communes of the Nord department
