= Voormezeele Enclosures Cemeteries =

WWI CWGC cemeteries in Ypres, Belgium

Voormezeele Enclosure Cemeteries
- Commonwealth War Graves Commission
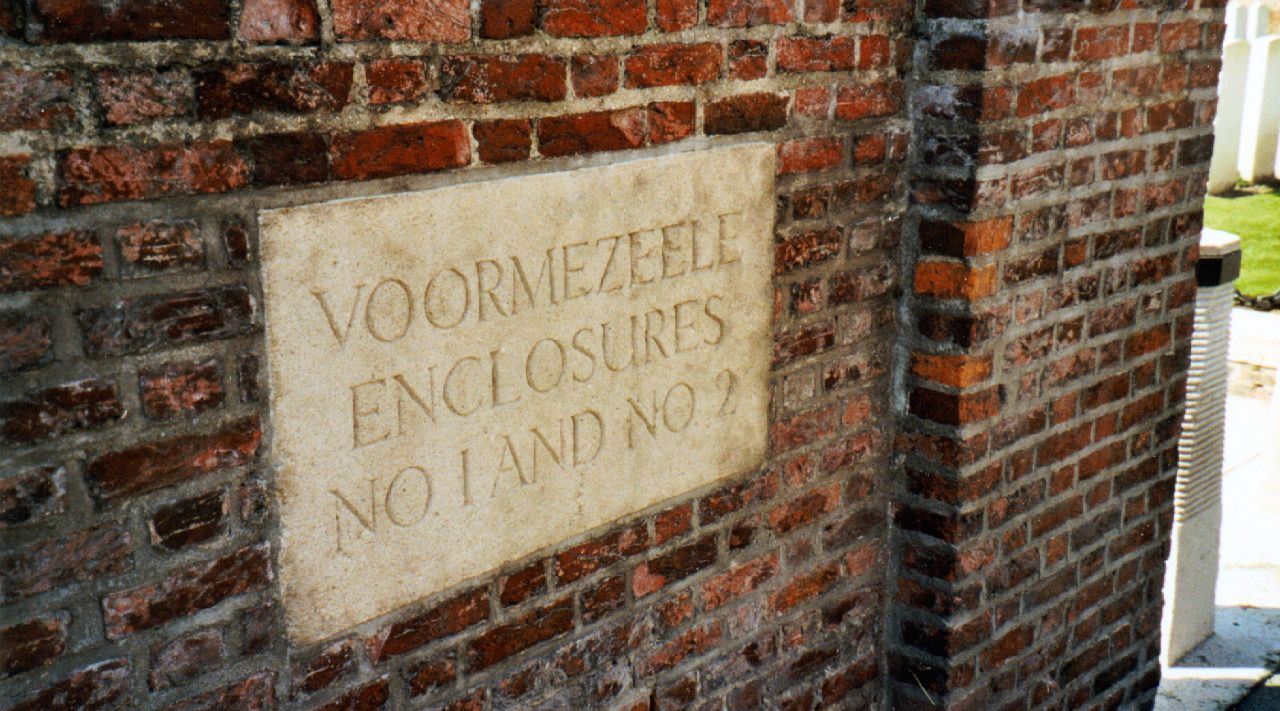
- Used for those deceased 1915–1918
- Established: 1915
- Location: 50°49′8″N 02°52′24″E near Voormezeele, West Flanders, Belgium
- Designed by: Sir Edwin Lutyens
- Total burials: 597 (Enclosures 1 and 2); 1,612 (Enclosure 3)
- Unknowns: 40 (Enclosures 1 and 2); 609 (Enclosure 3)

Burials by nation
- Allied Powers: (1 & 2/3): United Kingdom 520/1,498; Australia 17/11; Canada 54/99; New Zealand 2/2; South Africa 0/1 Central Powers: (Grounds/Lawn); Germany: 4/1

Burials by war
- World War I: 2,209
- Statistics source: WW1Cemeteries.com; CWGC figures differ noticeably whilst being less specific.

The Voormezeele Enclosures are Commonwealth War Graves Commission (CWGC) burial grounds for the dead of the First World War located in the Ypres Salient on the Western Front.

The cemetery grounds were assigned to the United Kingdom in perpetuity by King Albert I of Belgium in recognition of the sacrifices made by the British Empire in the defence and liberation of Belgium during the war.

== Foundation ==
Founded as four enclosures, there are now three cemeteries in Voormezeele, formed by grouping (enclosing) separate regimental cemeteries. Additionally, there is one grave in Voormezeele's parish churchyard.

Of the four enclosures, Enclosure 1 and 2 are now considered a single cemetery; the 42 graves of Enclosure 4 were concentrated into Enclosure 2; whilst Enclosure 3 is separated from 1 and 2 by the modern main road.

The village and the cemeteries fell into German hands on 29 April 1918 during the Spring Offensive, falling back to the Allies in September 1918 during the Hundred Days Offensive that swept fighting away from the Salient.

The cemeteries were designed by Sir Edwin Lutyens.

=== Enclosures 1 and 2 ===
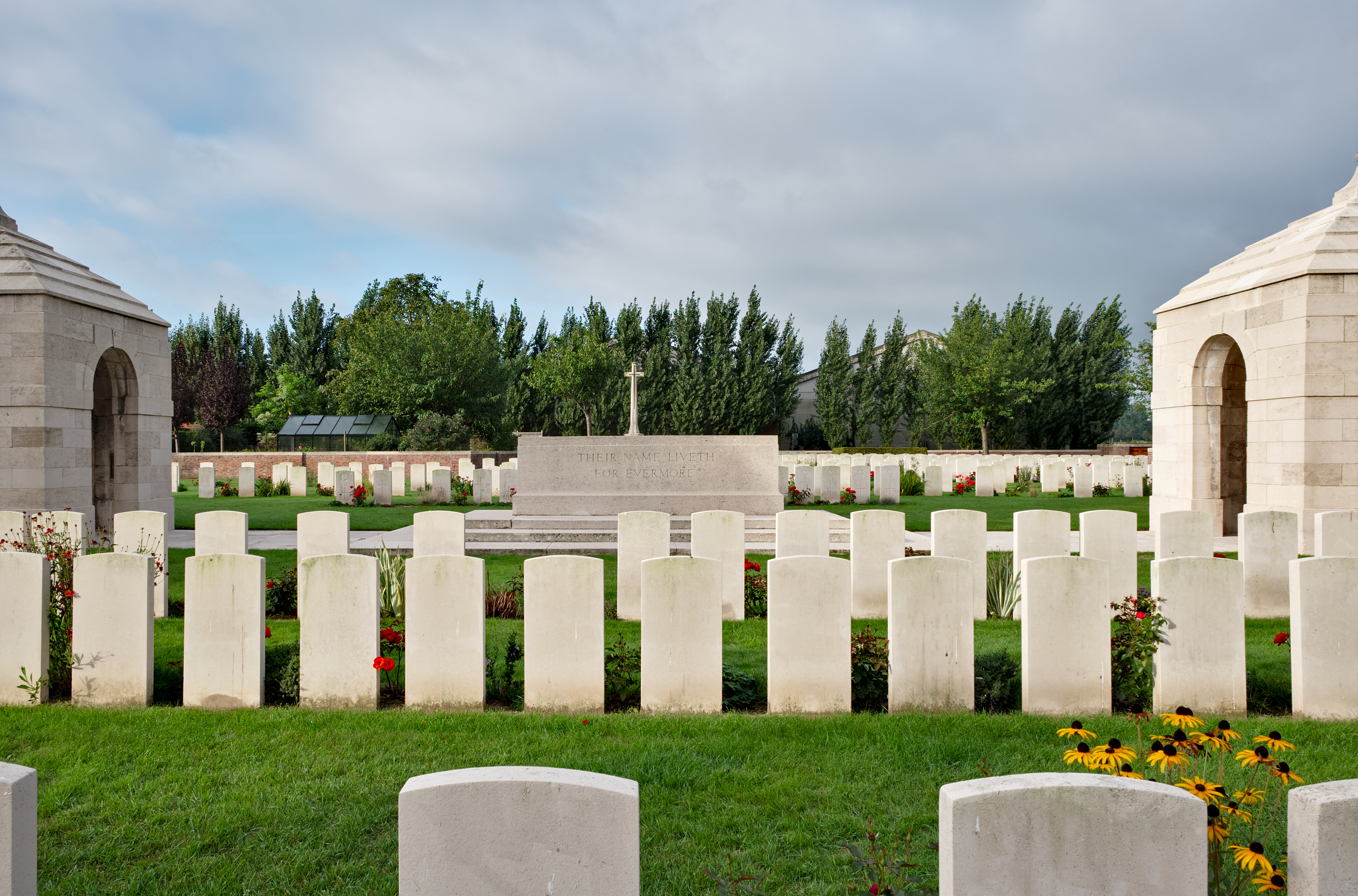
Enclosures 1 and 2

Enclosures 1 and 2 were in use from March 1915 until April 1918, with some graves being added by German forces during the five months the area was in their hands, more Commonwealth dead being added in September and October 1918 and an isolated Commonwealth grave from the village being concentrated after the Armistice.

=== Enclosure 3 ===
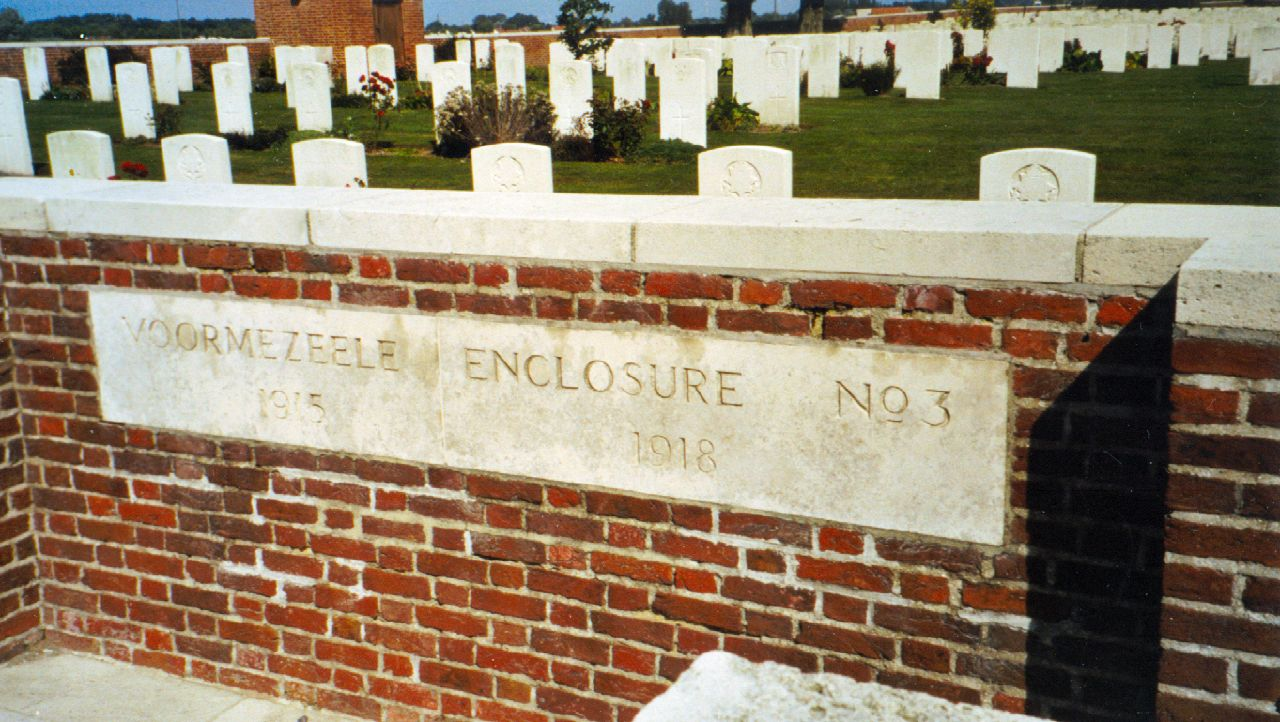
Voormezeele Enclosure No 3's entrance stone

Enclosure 3 was founded in February 1915 by Princess Patricia's Canadian Light Infantry, expanded by later use by other units. The enclosure was expanded by concentration after the Armistice from nearby smaller sites. Also interred in Enclosure 3 are the dead of the Hampshire Regiment and others who reclaimed the area from German hands in September 1918.

=== Former Enclosure 4 ===
Enclosure 4 was begun by the French in December 1914 and used by Commonwealth forces until November 1915. These graves were concentrated into the second plot of Enclosure 2.

== Notable graves ==
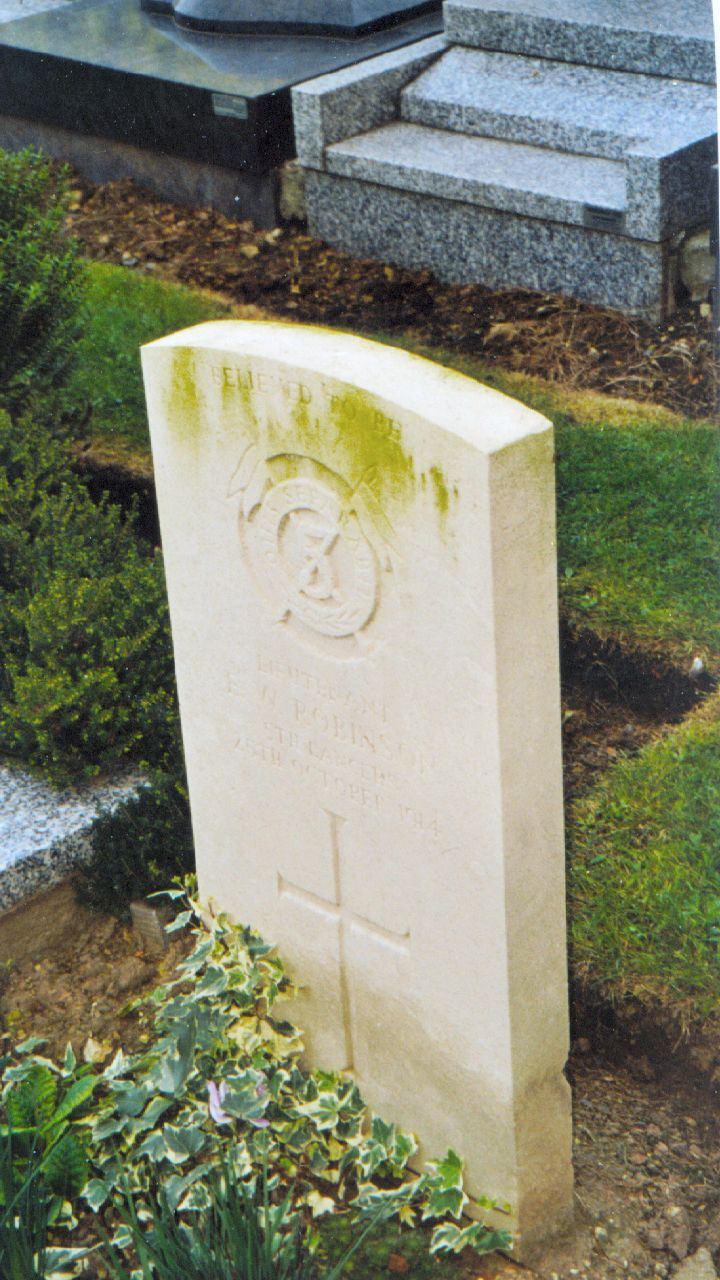
The grave of Edwin Winwood Robinson of the 5th Royal Irish Lancers, in the local churchyard.

Of the 2,209 men buried in these enclosures, some are especially notable. In Enclosure 3 lies a Canadian, Lieutenant Colonel Francis Douglas Farquhar, who earned the Distinguished Service Order. He was the son of Sir Henry and the Hon Alice, and the husband of Lady Evelyn (née Hely-Hutchinson).

Londoner Private William Dulgarians Crombie is also in Enclosure 3. He was 16 when he was killed on 9 November 1916.

George Llewelyn Davies, who with his four brothers were the inspiration for playwright J. M. Barrie's characters of Peter Pan and the Lost Boys, died on 15 March 1915, of a gunshot wound to the head at the age of 21. His grave is found in Voormezeele Enclosure No.3.

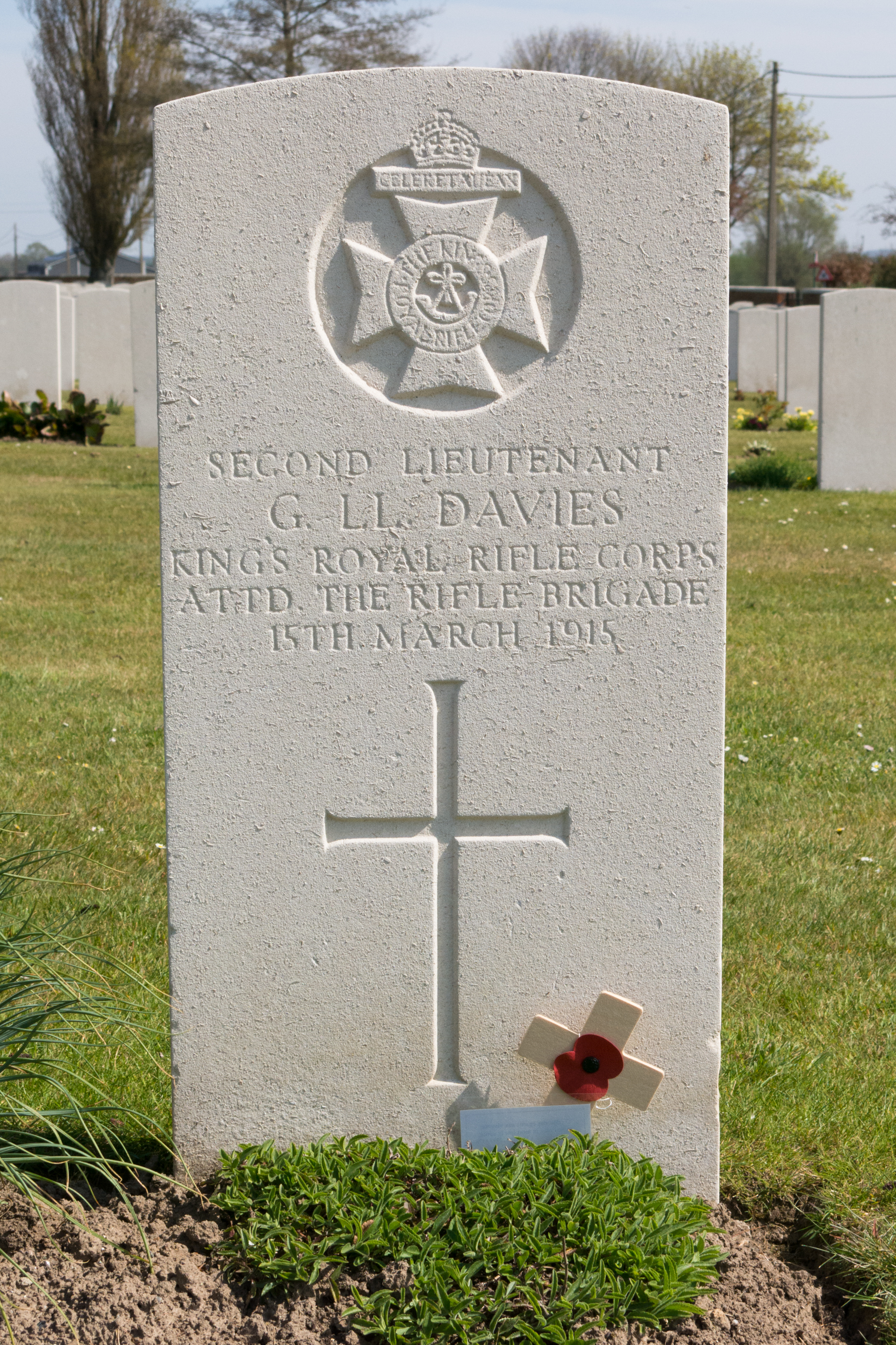
George Llewelyn Davies

There is one burial outside of the enclosures, still maintained by the commission. Lieutenant Edwin Winwood Robinson of the 5th Royal Irish Lancers was killed on 25 October 1914 and is buried in the local churchyard (of which Lt Robinson is the sole Commonwealth burial).

== Special memorials ==
The enclosures contain several cenotaphs. In Enclosures 1 and 2, there are cenotaphs to 19 known burials whose original graves were destroyed in later fighting, and for 2 men buried in the former Enclosure 4 whose graves were also destroyed.

In Enclosure 3 there are cenotaphs to 15 men who are known or believed to be buried on the site, plus other memorials recording 5 men who were known to be buried in another cemetery but who could not be found when that cemetery was concentrated to the Voormezeele Enclosures after the Armistice.
