= Linselles =

- Commune
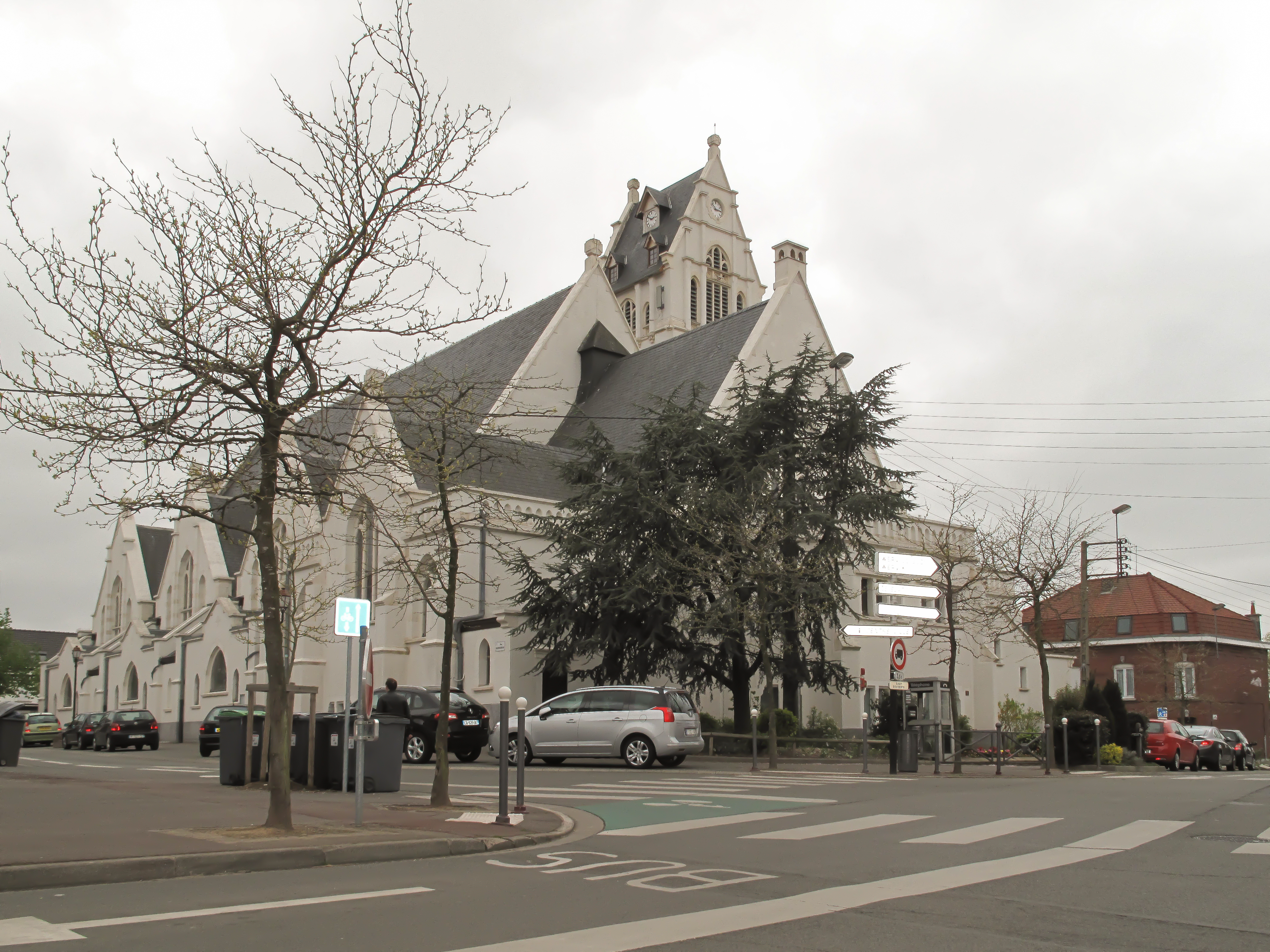
- The church in Linselles

- Coat of arms
- Location of Linselles
- Location within France Location within Hauts-de-France
- Coordinates: 50°44′17″N 3°04′50″E
- Country: France
- Region: Hauts-de-France
- Department: Nord
- Arrondissement: Lille
- Canton: Lambersart
- Intercommunality: Métropole Européenne de Lille

Government
  - Mayor (2022–2026): Isabelle Pollet
- Area^{1}: 11.71 km^{2} (4.52 sq mi)
- Elevation: 47 m (154 ft)
- Highest elevation: 52 m (171 ft)
- Lowest elevation: 17 m (56 ft)
- Population (2023): 8,161
  - Density: 696.9/km^{2} (1,805/sq mi)
- Time zone: UTC+01:00 (CET)
  - Summer (DST): UTC+02:00 (CEST)
- INSEE/Postal code: 59352 /59126
- ^{1} French Land Register data, which excludes lakes, ponds, glaciers > 1 km^{2} (0.386 sq mi or 247 acres) and river estuaries.

Linselles (French pronunciation: [lɛ̃sɛl]; Dutch: Linsele; Picard: Linséles) is a commune in the Nord department in northern France. It is part of the Métropole Européenne de Lille.

On 17 August 1793, during the War of the First Coalition, it was the site of the Battle of Lincelles, a victory for a combined British and Dutch force against those of Revolutionary France.

== Population ==
Historical population
Year	Pop.	±% p.a.
1968	5,796	—
1975	6,504	+1.66%
1982	6,754	+0.54%
1990	7,674	+1.61%
1999	7,876	+0.29%
2007	8,242	+0.57%
2012	8,104	−0.34%
2017	8,371	+0.65%
2023	8,161	−0.42%
Source: INSEE

== Heraldry ==
Arms of Linselles	The arms of Linselles are blazoned : Argent, a fess sable. (Linselles and Rieux-en-Cambrésis use the same arms.)

== See also ==
- Communes of the Nord department
