= Bousbecque =

- Commune
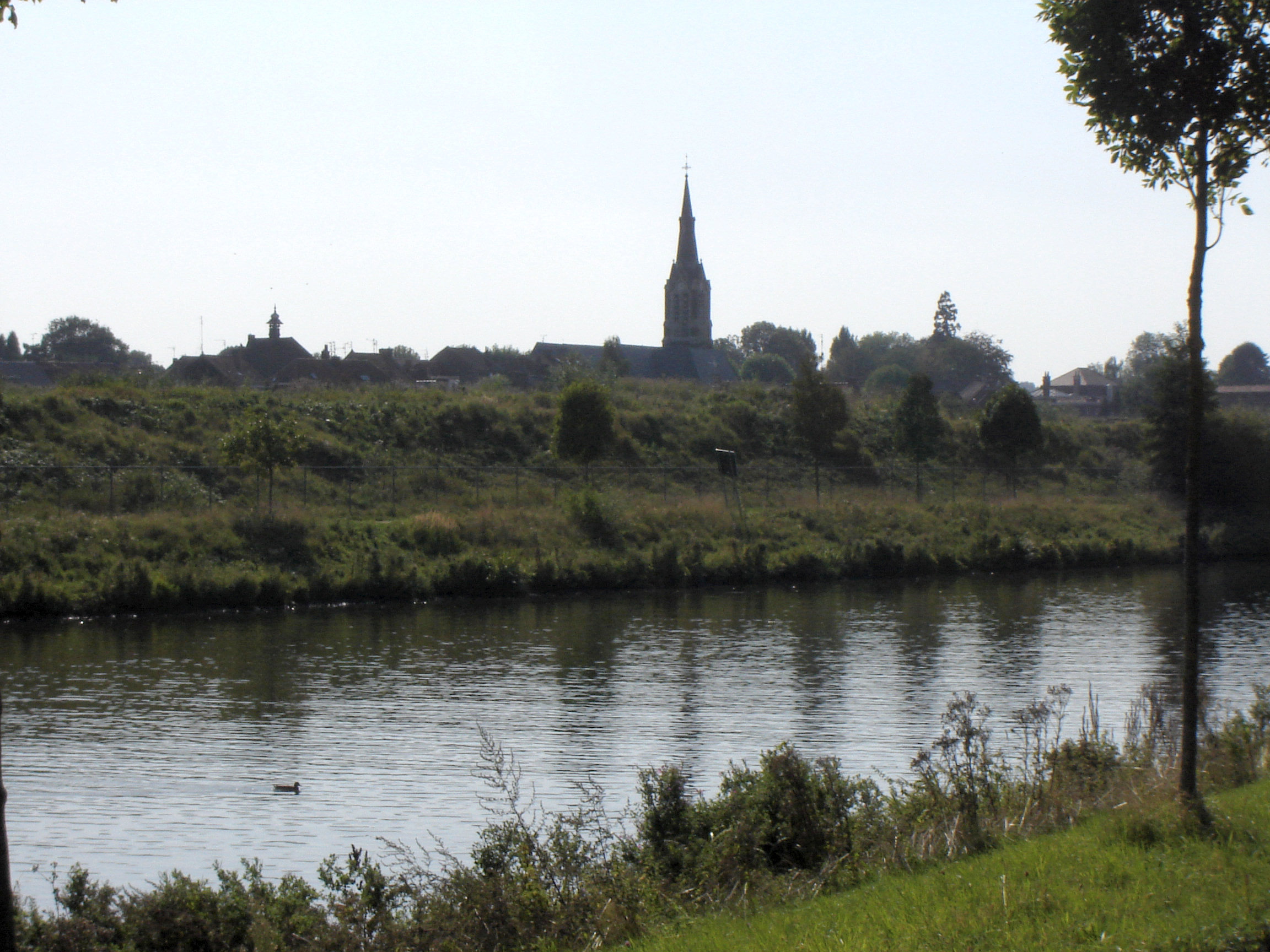
- A general view of Bousbecque

- Coat of arms
- Location of Bousbecque
- Location within France Location within Hauts-de-France
- Coordinates: 50°46′17″N 3°04′46″E
- Country: France
- Region: Hauts-de-France
- Department: Nord
- Arrondissement: Lille
- Canton: Lambersart
- Intercommunality: Métropole Européenne de Lille

Government
  - Mayor (2020–2026): Joseph Lefebvre
- Area^{1}: 6.44 km^{2} (2.49 sq mi)
- Elevation: 17 m (56 ft)
- Population (2023): 4,978
  - Density: 773/km^{2} (2,000/sq mi)
- Time zone: UTC+01:00 (CET)
  - Summer (DST): UTC+02:00 (CEST)
- INSEE/Postal code: 59098 /59166
- ^{1} French Land Register data, which excludes lakes, ponds, glaciers > 1 km^{2} (0.386 sq mi or 247 acres) and river estuaries.

Bousbecque (French pronunciation: [buzbɛk]; Dutch: Busbeke / Boesbeke) is a commune in the Nord department in northern France.

== Population ==
Historical population

Year	Pop.	±% p.a.
1793	1,540	—
1821	1,883	+0.72%
1846	1,900	+0.04%
1872	2,017	+0.23%
1901	3,044	+1.43%
1926	2,962	−0.11%
1946	2,913	−0.08%
1962	3,254	+0.69%
1968	3,345	+0.46%

Year	Pop.	±% p.a.
1975	3,446	+0.43%
1982	3,914	+1.84%
1990	3,912	−0.01%
1999	4,157	+0.68%
2007	4,621	+1.33%
2012	4,706	+0.37%
2017	4,831	+0.53%
2023	4,978	+0.50%

Source: EHESS and INSEE (1968-2023)

== Heraldry ==
Arms of Bousbecque	The arms of Bousbecque are blazoned : Vert, 3 stemless trefoils Or. (these are very like 3 petaled cinqfoils rather than trefoils)

== See also ==
- Communes of the Nord department
- Ogier Ghiselin de Busbecq
