= List of pals battalions =

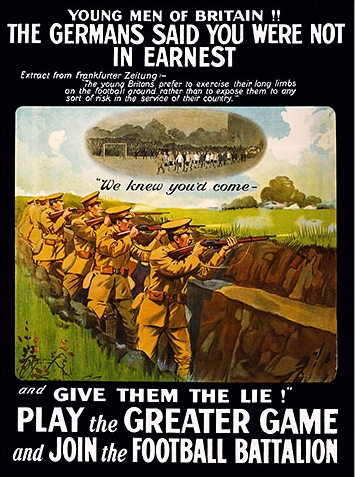
Recruiting poster for the Football Battalion

This is a list of pals battalions (also called "service" or "locally raised" battalions) of the British Army during the First World War. Pre-war Territorial Force (T.F.) battalions have not been included, although they too usually recruited from a specific area or occupation. The 69 line infantry regiments formed 142 locally raised battalions and 68 local reserve battalions. The Guards Regiments and the regiments formed only from Territorial Force battalions (Note: Regiments that were made up exclusively of Territorial Force battalions were: Honourable Artillery Company; Monmouthshire Regiment; Cambridgeshire Regiment; London Regiment; Hertfordshire Regiment; Herefordshire Regiment) did not form pals battalions.

== History ==
Lord Kitchener was one of the few people in 1914 to realise that the First World War was not going to be a short one; he believed that it would last three years and would require an army of 70 divisions. He eschewed the Territorial Force – partly due to the limitations imposed by its terms of service but also due to the poor impression he formed when observing the French Territorials in the Franco-Prussian War – and did not make use of the framework envisioned by Haldane's Reforms. He launched his appeal for 100,000 volunteers on 7 August 1914 to form a first New Army of six divisions (and support units) and within a few days this target had been reached; by the end of September, half a million volunteers had come forward to form the New Armies.

Each of the 69 line infantry regiments raised one battalion for the First (K1) (Note: The Royal Scots, the Highland Light Infantry and the Seaforth Highlanders raised two battalions for the 9th (Scottish) Division; the Royal Inniskilling Fusiliers, the Royal Irish Fusiliers, the Royal Dublin Fusiliers and the Royal Munster Fusiliers raised two battalions for the 10th (Irish) Division; the Royal Fusiliers raised two battalions for the 12th (Eastern) Division; and the Rifle Brigade and the King's Royal Rifle Corps raised three battalions for the 14th (Light) Division for a total of 81 battalions.) and for the Second New Armies (K2) (Note: The King's Own Scottish Borderers, the Gordon Highlanders and the Queen's Own Cameron Highlanders raised two battalions for the 15th (Scottish) Division; the Royal Inniskilling Fusiliers, the Royal Irish Fusiliers, the Royal Dublin Fusiliers and the Royal Munster Fusiliers raised two battalions for the 16th (Irish) Division; the Royal Fusiliers raised two battalions for the 18th (Eastern) Division; and the Rifle Brigade and the King's Royal Rifle Corps raised three battalions for the 20th (Light) Division for a total of 81 battalions.) designated as "service" battalions and numbered after the existing Territorial Force battalions of their parent regiments. This rigid structure did not take account of the differing ability of regiments to raise troops based upon the population of their recruiting areas. Therefore, the Third New Army (K3) had a much higher proportion of battalions from the more populous north of England, notably Cheshire, Lancashire, Yorkshire, Durham and Northumberland. The Fourth New Army (K4) was formed from men of the Reserve and Special Reserve battalions which were over establishment. Originally formed into the 30th – 35th Divisions, these were broken up so the battalions could train recruits and send drafts to the first three New Armies.

While the first four New Armies were being raised, a number of "service" battalions were also being raised by committees in cities and towns, and by other organizations and individuals. These units were recruited on a more narrow basis than usual, such as men who worked in a specific occupation or at a certain business, and were popularly known as "pals battalions". These were housed, clothed and fed by their committees until the War Office took them over in 1915 and the raisers' expenses were refunded. These units formed the Fifth and Sixth New Armies (later called the new Fourth and Fifth New Armies when the original Fourth New Army was broken up).

The locally recruited battalions also formed depot companies and in 1915 these were grouped into "reserve" battalions to provide reinforcements for their parents. They became part of the Training Reserve on 1 September 1916.

=== Units ===
The recruitment of pals battalions was confined to the 69 line infantry regiments of the British Army. The Guards Regiments and regiments formed only from Territorial Force battalions did not form any pals battalions. Amongst the line infantry regiments, there was considerable variation in the number of battalions recruited, depending upon the population of the regiment's recruiting areas. No pals battalions were raised in the more rural areas of England, the Scottish Highlands, or Ireland.

The Northumberland Fusiliers raised the largest number of pals battalions (twelve) of any regiment, followed by ten raised by the Royal Fusiliers, nine for the Welch Regiment, nine for the Middlesex Regiment, and nine for the Manchester Regiment. The Royal Irish Rifles had nine battalions raised in a similar fashion from the Ulster Volunteer Force.

In all, 142 "service" battalions and 68 "reserve" battalions were formed.

=== Formations ===
The pals battalions formed the bulk of the infantry for the divisions of the Fifth New Army (30th, 31st, 32nd, 33rd, 34th, and 35th) and the Sixth New Army (36th (Ulster), 37th, 38th (Welsh), 39th, 40th, and 41st). The exceptions were:

- the 37th Division was made up of 13 Army Troops battalions from the First (2), Second (2) and Third (9) New Armies.
- the 14th (Service) Battalion, Princess Louise's (Argyll and Sutherland Highlanders) was raised as part of the original 33rd Division of the Fourth New Army. When the Fourth New Army was broken up, it was reassigned to the 118th Brigade, 39th Division.

A handful of battalions served away from the Fifth and Sixth New Army divisions:

- 10th (Service) Battalion, Royal Fusiliers (Stockbrokers) was initially an 'Army Troops' battalion attached to the 54th Brigade, 18th (Eastern) Division (Second New Army), and then served with 37th Division on the Western Front
- 25th (Service) Battalion, Royal Fusiliers (City of London Regiment) (Frontiersmen) served in the East African Campaign from May 1915 to the end of 1917
- 21st (Service) Battalion, Prince of Wales's Own (West Yorkshire Regiment) (Wool Textile Pioneers) as Pioneers in the Regular 4th Division
- 11th (Service) Battalion, Leicestershire Regiment (Midland Pioneers) as Pioneers in the Regular 6th Division
- 13th (Service) Battalion, Cheshire Regiment was locally raised but was assigned to the 74th Brigade, 25th Division (Third New Army)
- 13th (Service) Battalion, Worcestershire Regiment (Severn Valley Pioneers) as Pioneers in the 63rd (Royal Naval) Division
- 10th (Service) Battalion, Duke of Cornwall's Light Infantry (Cornwall Pioneers) as Pioneers in the Regular 2nd Division
- 23rd (Service) Battalion, Welsh Regiment (Welsh Pioneers) as Pioneers in the Regular 28th Division
- 26th (Service) Battalion, Duke of Cambridge's Own (Middlesex Regiment) (3rd Public Works Pioneers) as Pioneers in the Regular 27th Division
- 20th (Service) Battalion, King's Royal Rifle Corps (British Empire League Pioneers) as Pioneers in the Regular 3rd Division
- 22nd (Service) Battalion, Durham Light Infantry (3rd County Pioneers) as Pioneers in the Regular 8th Division

== List of pals infantry battalions by regiment ==
Regiment	Battalion	Sub title	Where and when formed	Formed by	Original assignment	Notes
Royal Scots (Lothian Regiment)	15th (Service)	1st Edinburgh	Edinburgh, September 1914	Lord Provost (R. Cranston) and City	101st Brigade, 34th Division	
Royal Scots (Lothian Regiment)	16th (Service)	2nd Edinburgh	Edinburgh, December 1914	Lt Col Sir George McCrae MP	101st Brigade, 34th Division	
Royal Scots (Lothian Regiment)	17th (Service)	Rosebery	Edinburgh, February 1915	Lord Rosebery and a local committee	106th Brigade, 35th Division	Bantam battalion
Royal Scots (Lothian Regiment)	18th (Reserve)		Edinburgh, June 1915	Depot companies of 15th, 16th and 17th Battalions	18th Reserve Brigade	
Queen's (Royal West Surrey Regiment)	10th (Service)	Battersea	Battersea, 3 June 1915	Mayor and Borough of Battersea	124th Brigade, 41st Division	
Queen's (Royal West Surrey Regiment)	11th (Service)	Lambeth	Lambeth, 16 June 1915	Mayor and Borough of Lambeth	123rd Brigade, 41st Division	
Queen's (Royal West Surrey Regiment)	12th (Reserve)		Brixton, October 1915	Depot companies of 10th and 11th Battalions	23rd Reserve Brigade	
Buffs (East Kent Regiment)	Did not form any locally raised battalions.					
King's Own (Royal Lancaster Regiment)	11th (Service)		Lancaster, August 1915		120th Brigade, 40th Division	Bantam battalion
Northumberland Fusiliers	16th (Service)	Newcastle	Newcastle, September 1914	Newcastle and Gateshead Chamber of Commerce	96th Brigade, 32nd Division	
Northumberland Fusiliers	17th (Service)	N.E.R., Pioneers	Hull, September 1914	North Eastern Railway	Pioneers, 32nd Division	
Northumberland Fusiliers	18th (Service)	1st Tyneside Pioneers	Newcastle, 15 October 1914	Lord Mayor and City	Pioneers, 34th Division	
Northumberland Fusiliers	19th (Service)	2nd Tyneside Pioneers	Newcastle, 16 November 1914	Lord Mayor and City	Pioneers, 35th Division	
Northumberland Fusiliers	20th (Service)	1st Tyneside Scottish	Newcastle, 14 October 1914	Lord Mayor and City	102nd Brigade, 34th Division	
Northumberland Fusiliers	21st (Service)	2nd Tyneside Scottish	Newcastle, 26 September 1914	Lord Mayor and City	102nd Brigade, 34th Division	
Northumberland Fusiliers	23rd (Service)	3rd Tyneside Scottish	Newcastle, 5 November 1914	Lord Mayor and City	102nd Brigade, 34th Division	
Northumberland Fusiliers	24th (Service)	4th Tyneside Scottish	Newcastle, 16 November 1914	Lord Mayor and City	102nd Brigade, 34th Division	
Northumberland Fusiliers	25th (Service)	1st Tyneside Irish	Newcastle, 14 November 1914	Lord Mayor and City	103rd Brigade, 34th Division	
Northumberland Fusiliers	26th (Service)	2nd Tyneside Irish	Newcastle, 9 November 1914	Lord Mayor and City	103rd Brigade, 34th Division	
Northumberland Fusiliers	27th (Service)	3rd Tyneside Irish	Newcastle, 23 November 1914	Lord Mayor and City	103rd Brigade, 34th Division	
Northumberland Fusiliers	28th (Service)	4th Tyneside Irish	Newcastle, 5 January 1915	Lord Mayor and City	103rd Brigade, 34th Division	
Northumberland Fusiliers	28th (Reserve)		Cramlington, July 1915	Depot companies of the 18th and 19th Battalions	19th Reserve Brigade	
Northumberland Fusiliers	29th (Reserve)	Tyneside Scottish	Alnwick, July 1915	Depot companies of the 20th, 21st, 22nd and 23rd Battalions	20th Reserve Brigade	
Northumberland Fusiliers	30th (Reserve)	Tyneside Irish	Woolsington, July 1915	Depot companies of the 24th, 25th, 26th and 27th Battalions	20th Reserve Brigade	
Northumberland Fusiliers	31st (Reserve)		Catterick, November 1915	Depot companies of the 16th Battalion	20th Reserve Brigade	
Northumberland Fusiliers	32nd (Reserve)		Ripon, November 1915	Depot companies of the 17th Battalion	19th Reserve Brigade	
Northumberland Fusiliers	33rd (Reserve)	Tyneside Scottish	Hornsea, June 1916	From the 29th Battalion	20th Reserve Brigade	
Northumberland Fusiliers	34th (Reserve)	Tyneside Irish	Hornsea, June 1916	From the 30th Battalion	20th Reserve Brigade	
Royal Warwickshire Regiment	14th (Service)	1st Birmingham	Birmingham, September 1914	Lord Mayor and a local committee	95th Brigade, 32nd Division	
Royal Warwickshire Regiment	15th (Service)	2nd Birmingham	Birmingham, September 1914	Lord Mayor and a local committee	95th Brigade, 32nd Division	
Royal Warwickshire Regiment	16th (Service)	3rd Birmingham	Birmingham, September 1914	Lord Mayor and a local committee	95th Brigade, 32nd Division	
Royal Warwickshire Regiment	17th (Reserve)		Sutton Coldfield, June 1915	Depot companies of 14th, 15th and 16th Battalions	22nd Reserve Brigade	
Royal Fusiliers (City of London Regiment)	10th (Service)	Stockbrokers	London, 21 August 1914	Lord Mayor and City of London from business staffs in the City (Note: Although the 10th (Service) Battalion, Royal Fusiliers was a locally raised battalion, and carried an unofficial sub title of "Stockbrokers", it was in the Second New Army (K2) and was initially designated 'Army Troops'.)	111th Brigade, 37th Division	
Royal Fusiliers (City of London Regiment)	17th (Service)	Empire	London, 31 August 1914	British Empire Committee	99th Brigade, 33rd Division	
Royal Fusiliers (City of London Regiment)	18th (Service)	1st Public Schools	Epsom, 11 September 1914	Public Schools and University Men's Force	98th Brigade, 33rd Division	
Royal Fusiliers (City of London Regiment)	19th (Service)	2nd Public Schools	Epsom, 11 September 1914	Public Schools and University Men's Force	98th Brigade, 33rd Division	
Royal Fusiliers (City of London Regiment)	20th (Service)	3rd Public Schools	Epsom, 11 September 1914	Public Schools and University Men's Force	98th Brigade, 33rd Division	
Royal Fusiliers (City of London Regiment)	21st (Service)	4th Public Schools	Epsom, 11 September 1914	Public Schools and University Men's Force	98th Brigade, 33rd Division	
Royal Fusiliers (City of London Regiment)	22nd (Service)	Kensington	White City, 11 September 1914	Mayor and Borough of Kensington	99th Brigade, 33rd Division	
Royal Fusiliers (City of London Regiment)	23rd (Service)	1st Sportsmen's	London, 25 September 1914	E. Cunliffe-Owen	99th Brigade, 33rd Division	
Royal Fusiliers (City of London Regiment)	24th (Service)	2nd Sportsmen's	London, 20 November 1914	E. Cunliffe-Owen	99th Brigade, 33rd Division	
Royal Fusiliers (City of London Regiment)	25th (Service)	Frontiersmen	London, 12 February 1915	Legion of Frontiersmen (Note: 25th (Frontiersmen) Battalion, Royal Fusiliers served in the East African Campaign from May 1915 to the end of 1917.)		
Royal Fusiliers (City of London Regiment)	26th (Service)	Bankers	London, 17 July 1915	Lord Mayor and City of London from bank clerks and accountants	124th Brigade, 41st Division	
Royal Fusiliers (City of London Regiment)	27th (Reserve)		Horsham, August 1915	Depot companies of 17th, 22nd and 32nd Battalions	24th Reserve Brigade	
Royal Fusiliers (City of London Regiment)	28th (Reserve)	Public Schools	Epsom, August 1915	Depot companies of 18th and 19th Battalions	24th Reserve Brigade	
Royal Fusiliers (City of London Regiment)	29th (Reserve)	Public Schools	Epsom, August 1915	Depot companies of 20th and 21st Battalions	24th Reserve Brigade	
Royal Fusiliers (City of London Regiment)	30th (Reserve)		Romford, August 1915	Depot companies of 23rd and 24th Battalions	24th Reserve Brigade	
Royal Fusiliers (City of London Regiment)	31st (Reserve)		Colchester, September 1915	Depot companies of 10th and 26th Battalions	24th Reserve Brigade	
Royal Fusiliers (City of London Regiment)	32nd (Service)	East Ham	East Ham, 28 October 1915	Mayor and Borough of East Ham	124th Brigade, 41st Division	
King's (Liverpool Regiment)	17th (Service)	1st City	Liverpool, 29 August 1914	Lord Derby	89th Brigade, 30th Division	
King's (Liverpool Regiment)	18th (Service)	2nd City	Liverpool, 29 August 1914	Lord Derby	89th Brigade, 30th Division	
King's (Liverpool Regiment)	19th (Service)	3rd City	Liverpool, 29 August 1914	Lord Derby	89th Brigade, 30th Division	
King's (Liverpool Regiment)	20th (Service)	4th City	Liverpool, 16 October 1914	Lord Derby	89th Brigade, 30th Division	
King's (Liverpool Regiment)	21st (Reserve)		Knowsley Park, August 1915	Depot companies of 17th and 18th Battalions	16th Reserve Brigade	
King's (Liverpool Regiment)	22nd (Reserve)		Knowsley Park, August 1915	Depot companies of 19th and 20th Battalions	16th Reserve Brigade	
Norfolk Regiment	Did not form any locally raised battalions.					
Lincolnshire Regiment	10th (Service)	Grimsby	Grimsby, 9 September 1914	Mayor and Town	101st Brigade, 34th Division	
Lincolnshire Regiment	11th (Reserve)		Lincoln, October 1915	Depot companies of 10th Battalion	19th Reserve Brigade	
Devonshire Regiment	Did not form any locally raised battalions.					
Suffolk Regiment	11th (Service)	Cambridgeshire	Cambridge, 25 September 1914	Cambridge and Isle of Ely T.F. Association	101st Brigade, 34th Division	
Suffolk Regiment	12th (Service)	East Anglian	Bury St. Edmunds, July 1915		121st Brigade, 40th Division	Bantam battalion
Suffolk Regiment	13th (Reserve)	Cambridgeshire	Cambridge, September 1915	Depot companies of 11th Battalion	26th Reserve Brigade	
Prince Albert's (Somerset Light Infantry)	Did not form any locally raised battalions.					
Prince of Wales's Own (West Yorkshire Regiment)	15th (Service)	1st Leeds	Leeds, September 1914	Lord Mayor and City	93rd Brigade, 31st Division	
Prince of Wales's Own (West Yorkshire Regiment)	16th (Service)	1st Bradford	Bradford, September 1914	Lord Mayor and City	93rd Brigade, 31st Division	
Prince of Wales's Own (West Yorkshire Regiment)	17th (Service)	2nd Leeds	Leeds, December 1914	Lord Mayor and City	106th Brigade, 35th Division	Bantam battalion
Prince of Wales's Own (West Yorkshire Regiment)	18th (Service)	2nd Bradford	Bradford, 22 January 1915	Lord Mayor and City	93rd Brigade, 31st Division	
Prince of Wales's Own (West Yorkshire Regiment)	19th (Reserve)		Clipstone, August 1915	Depot companies of 15th and 17th Battalions	21st Reserve Brigade	
Prince of Wales's Own (West Yorkshire Regiment)	20th (Reserve)		Clipstone, August 1915	Depot companies of 16th and 18th Battalions	21st Reserve Brigade	
Prince of Wales's Own (West Yorkshire Regiment)	21st (Service)	Wool Textile Pioneers	West Riding, 24 September 1915	Lord Mayor and City of Leeds	Pioneers, 4th Division	
East Yorkshire Regiment	10th (Service)	1st Hull (Hull Commercials)	Hull, 29 August 1914	Lord Nunburnholme and East Riding T.F. Association	92nd Brigade, 31st Division	
East Yorkshire Regiment	11th (Service)	2nd Hull (Hull Tradesmen)	Hull, 2 September 1914	Lord Nunburnholme and East Riding T.F. Association	92nd Brigade, 31st Division	
East Yorkshire Regiment	12th (Service)	3rd Hull (Hull Sportsmen)	Hull, 11 August 1914	Lord Nunburnholme and East Riding T.F. Association	92nd Brigade, 31st Division	
East Yorkshire Regiment	13th (Service)	4th Hull (T'others)	Hull, 3 November 1914	Lord Nunburnholme and East Riding T.F. Association	92nd Brigade, 31st Division	
East Yorkshire Regiment	14th (Reserve)	Hull	Lichfield, August 1915	Depot companies of 10th, 11th, 12th and 13th Battalions	21st Reserve Brigade	
East Yorkshire Regiment	15th (Reserve)		Seaton Delaval, February 1916	From the 14th Battalion	21st Reserve Brigade	
Bedfordshire Regiment	Did not form any locally raised battalions.					
Leicestershire Regiment	11th (Service)	Midland Pioneers	Leicester, October 1915	Mayor and local committee	Pioneers, 6th Division	
Leicestershire Regiment	12th (Reserve)		Leicester, March 1916	Depot companies of 11th Battalion	19th Reserve Brigade	
Royal Irish Regiment	Did not form any locally raised battalions.					
Alexandra, Princess of Wales's Own (Yorkshire Regiment)	12th (Service)	Tees-side Pioneers	Middlesbrough, 21 December 1914	Mayor and Town	Pioneers, 40th Division	
Alexandra, Princess of Wales's Own (Yorkshire Regiment)	13th (Service)		Richmond, July 1915		121st Brigade, 40th Division	Bantam battalion
Alexandra, Princess of Wales's Own (Yorkshire Regiment)	14th (Reserve)		Darlington, September 1915	Depot companies of 12th Battalion	19th Reserve Brigade	
Lancashire Fusiliers	15th (Service)	1st Salford	Salford, 11 September 1914	Mr. Montague Barlow, MP and the Salford Brigade Committee	96th Brigade, 32nd Division	
Lancashire Fusiliers	16th (Service)	2nd Salford	Salford, 5 November 1914	Mr. Montague Barlow, MP and the Salford Brigade Committee	96th Brigade, 32nd Division	
Lancashire Fusiliers	17th (Service)	1st South-East Lancashire	Bury, 3 December 1914	Lt Col G.E. Wike and a committee	104th Brigade, 35th Division	Bantam battalion
Lancashire Fusiliers	18th (Service)	2nd South-East Lancashire	Bury, 13 January 1915	Lt Col G.E. Wike and a committee	104th Brigade, 35th Division	Bantam battalion
Lancashire Fusiliers	19th (Service)	3rd Salford, Pioneers (Note: Later assigned as Pioneers to the 49th (West Riding) Division.)	Salford, 15 January 1915	Mr. Montague Barlow, MP and the Salford Brigade Committee	96th Brigade, 32nd Division	
Lancashire Fusiliers	20th (Service)	4th Salford	Salford, 23 March 1915	Mr. Montague Barlow, MP and the Salford Brigade Committee	104th Brigade, 35th Division	Bantam battalion
Lancashire Fusiliers	21st (Reserve)	Salford	Conway, August 1915	Depot companies of 15th, 16th and 19th Battalions	17th Reserve Brigade	
Lancashire Fusiliers	22nd (Reserve)		Ashton-in-Makerfield, August 1915	Depot companies of 17th, 18th and 20th Battalions	17th Reserve Brigade	
Royal Scots Fusiliers	Did not form any locally raised battalions.					
Cheshire Regiment	13th (Service)		Port Sunlight, 1 September 1914	Gershom Stewart, MP (Note: The 13th (Service) Battalion, Cheshire Regiment differed from other locally raised battalions in that it did not have a sub title (although there is a reference to the "Wirral Battalion" in the regimental history) and it was assigned to the 74th Brigade, 25th Division in the Third New Army (K3).)		
Cheshire Regiment	15th (Service)	1st Birkenhead	Birkenhead, 18 November 1914	Alfred Bigland, MP	105th Brigade, 35th Division	Bantam battalion
Cheshire Regiment	16th (Service)	2nd Birkenhead	Birkenhead, 3 December 1914	Alfred Bigland, MP	105th Brigade, 35th Division	Bantam battalion
Cheshire Regiment	17th (Reserve)		Bebington, 10 August 1915	Depot companies of 15th and 16th Battalions	17th Reserve Brigade	
Royal Welsh Fusiliers	13th (Service)	1st North Wales	Rhyl, 3 September 1914	Denbighshire and Flintshire T.F. Associations	113th Brigade, 38th (Welsh) Division	
Royal Welsh Fusiliers	14th (Service)	Caernarvon and Anglesey	Llandudno, 2 November 1914	Welsh National Executive Committee	113th Brigade, 38th (Welsh) Division	
Royal Welsh Fusiliers	15th (Service)	1st London Welsh	London, 20 October 1914		113th Brigade, 38th (Welsh) Division	
Royal Welsh Fusiliers	16th (Service)		Llandudno, November 1914	Welsh National Executive Committee, from 13th Battalion	113th Brigade, 38th (Welsh) Division	
Royal Welsh Fusiliers	17th (Service)	2nd North Wales	Llandudno, 2 February 1915	Welsh National Executive Committee	115th Brigade, 38th (Welsh) Division	
Royal Welsh Fusiliers	18th (Reserve)	2nd London Welsh	London, February 1915		14th Reserve Brigade	
Royal Welsh Fusiliers	19th (Service)		Deganwy, March 1915	Welsh National Executive Committee	119th Brigade, 40th Division	Bantam battalion
South Wales Borderers	10th (Service)	1st Gwent	Brecon, October 1914	Welsh National Executive Committee	115th Brigade, 38th (Welsh) Division	
South Wales Borderers	11th (Service)	2nd Gwent	Brecon, 5 December 1914	Welsh National Executive Committee	115th Brigade, 38th (Welsh) Division	
South Wales Borderers	12th (Service)	3rd Gwent	Newport, March 1915	Welsh National Executive Committee	119th Brigade, 40th Division	Bantam battalion
South Wales Borderers	13th (Reserve)		St Asaph, July 1915	Depot companies of 10th and 11th Battalions	13th Reserve Brigade	
South Wales Borderers	14th (Reserve)		Prees Heath, September 1915	Depot companies of 12th Battalion	14th Reserve Brigade	
King's Own Scottish Borderers	Did not form any locally raised battalions.					
Cameronians (Scottish Rifles)	13th (Service)		Hamilton, July 1915		120th Brigade, 40th Division	Bantam battalion
Royal Inniskilling Fusiliers	9th (Service)	County Tyrone	Omagh, September 1914	Tyrone Volunteers of the Ulster Volunteer Force	109th Brigade, 36th (Ulster) Division	
Royal Inniskilling Fusiliers	10th (Service)	Derry	Omagh, September 1914	County Londonderry Volunteers of the Ulster Volunteer Force	109th Brigade, 36th (Ulster) Division	
Royal Inniskilling Fusiliers	11th (Service)	Donegal and Fermanagh	Omagh, September 1914	Donegal and Fermanagh Volunteers of the Ulster Volunteer Force	109th Brigade, 36th (Ulster) Division	
Royal Inniskilling Fusiliers	12th (Reserve)		Enniskillen, July 1915	Depot companies of 9th, 10th and 11th Battalions	15th (Ulster) Reserve Brigade	
Gloucestershire Regiment	12th (Service)	Bristol's Own	Bristol, 30 August 1914	Citizens' Recruiting Committee	95th Brigade, 32nd Division	
Gloucestershire Regiment	13th (Service)	Forest of Dean, Pioneers	Malvern, December 1914	Lt Col H. Webb MP (Note: Lt Col H. Webb MP raised a battalion for the Gloucestershire Regiment and another for the Worcestershire Regiment.)	Pioneers, 39th Division	
Gloucestershire Regiment	14th (Service)	West of England	Bristol, 22 April 1915	Citizens' Recruiting Committee	105th Brigade, 35th Division	Bantam battalion
Gloucestershire Regiment	15th (Reserve)		Sutton Coldfield, August 1915	Depot companies of 12th and 14th Battalions	22nd Reserve Brigade	
Gloucestershire Regiment	16th (Reserve)		Chiseldon, November 1915	Depot companies of 13th Battalion	22nd Reserve Brigade	
Worcestershire Regiment	13th (Service)	Severn Valley Pioneers	Worcester, 10 September 1915	Lt Col H. Webb MP	Pioneers, 63rd (Royal Naval) Division	
East Lancashire Regiment	11th (Service)	Accrington	Accrington, 2 September 1914	Mayor and town of Accrington (Note: 11th (Service) Battalion (Accrington), East Lancashire Regiment also recruited from Burnley, Blackburn, and Chorley.)	94th Brigade, 31st Division	
East Lancashire Regiment	12th (Reserve)		Chadderton Camp, Oldham, May 1915	Depot companies of 11th Battalion	17th Reserve Brigade	
East Surrey Regiment	12th (Service)	Bermondsey	Bermondsey, 14 May 1915	Mayor and Borough of Bermondsey	122nd Brigade, 41st Division	
East Surrey Regiment	13th (Service)	Wandsworth	Wandsworth, 16 June 1915	Mayor and Borough of Wandsworth	118th Brigade, 39th Division	
East Surrey Regiment	14th (Reserve)		Wandsworth, summer 1915	Depot companies of 12th and 13th Battalions	26th Reserve Brigade	
Duke of Cornwall's Light Infantry	10th (Service)	Cornwall Pioneers	Truro, 29 March 1915	Mayor and City	Pioneers, 2nd Division	
Duke of Cornwall's Light Infantry	11th (Reserve)		Launceston, November 1915	Depot companies of 10th Battalion	22nd Reserve Brigade	
Duke of Wellington's (West Riding Regiment)	Did not form any locally raised battalions.					
Border Regiment	11th (Service)	Lonsdale	Penrith, 29 March 1915	Earl of Lonsdale and an Executive Committee (Note: 11th (Service) Battalion, Border Regiment was raised in Carlisle, Kendal and Workington with H.Q. at Penrith.)	97th Brigade, 32nd Division	
Border Regiment	12th (Reserve)		Prees Heath	Depot companies of 11th Battalion	17th Reserve Brigade	
Royal Sussex Regiment	11th (Service)	1st South Down	Bexhill, 7 September 1914	Lt Col C. Lowther MP and committee	116th Brigade, 39th Division	
Royal Sussex Regiment	12th (Service)	2nd South Down	Bexhill, 3 November 1914	Lt Col C. Lowther MP and committee	116th Brigade, 39th Division	
Royal Sussex Regiment	13th (Service)	3rd South Down	Bexhill, 20 November 1914	Lt Col C. Lowther MP and committee	116th Brigade, 39th Division	
Royal Sussex Regiment	14th (Reserve)		Bexhill, August 1915	Depot companies of 12th, 13th and 14th Battalions	23rd Reserve Brigade	
Hampshire Regiment	14th (Service)	1st Portsmouth	Portsmouth, 3 September 1914	Mayor J. H. Corke and local committee	116th Brigade, 39th Division	
Hampshire Regiment	15th (Service)	2nd Portsmouth	Portsmouth, 5 April 1915	Mayor J. H. Corke and local committee	122nd Brigade, 41st Division	
Hampshire Regiment	16th (Reserve)	Portsmouth	Portsmouth, September 1915	Depot companies of 14th and 15th Battalions	22nd Reserve Brigade	
South Staffordshire Regiment	Did not form any locally raised battalions.					
Dorsetshire Regiment	Did not form any locally raised battalions.					
Prince of Wales's Volunteers (South Lancashire Regiment)	11th (Service)	St. Helens Pioneers	St. Helens, 1 September 1914	Lord Derby	Pioneers, 30th Division	
Prince of Wales's Volunteers (South Lancashire Regiment)	12th (Service)		Warrington, June 1915		120th Brigade, 40th Division	Bantam battalion
Prince of Wales's Volunteers (South Lancashire Regiment)	13th (Reserve)		Oswestry, September 1915	Depot companies of 11th Battalion	16th Reserve Brigade	
Welsh Regiment	10th (Service)	1st Rhondda	Rhondda Valley, September 1914	D. Watts Morgan MP (Note: 10th (Service) Battalion, Welsh Regiment was raised for the Third New Army (K3) and assigned to 76th Brigade, 25th Division but on 30 September 1914 it joined the other locally raised battalions in 38th (Welsh) Division.)	114th Brigade, 38th (Welsh) Division	
Welsh Regiment	13th (Service)	2nd Rhondda	Cardiff, 23 October 1914	Welsh National Executive Committee	114th Brigade, 38th (Welsh) Division	
Welsh Regiment	14th (Service)	Swansea	Swansea, October 1914	Mayor and Corporation with the Swansea Football and Cricket Club	114th Brigade, 38th (Welsh) Division	
Welsh Regiment	15th (Service)	Carmarthenshire	Carmarthen, October 1914	Carmarthenshire Country Committee	114th Brigade, 38th (Welsh) Division	
Welsh Regiment	16th (Service)	Cardiff City	Cardiff, November 1914	Lord Mayor and Corporation	115th Brigade, 38th (Welsh) Division	
Welsh Regiment	17th (Service)	1st Glamorgan	December 1914	Welsh National Executive Committee	119th Brigade, 40th Division	Bantam battalion
Welsh Regiment	18th (Service)	2nd Glamorgan	January 1915	Welsh National Executive Committee	119th Brigade, 40th Division	Bantam battalion
Welsh Regiment	19th (Service)	Glamorgan Pioneers	Colwyn Bay, February 1915	Welsh National Executive Committee	Pioneers, 38th (Welsh) Division	
Welsh Regiment	20th (Reserve)	3rd Rhondda	St. Asaph, July 1915	Depot companies of 10th and 13th Battalions	13th Reserve Brigade	
Welsh Regiment	21st (Reserve)		Colwyn Bay, July 1915	Depot companies of 14th, 15th, 16th and 19th Battalions	13th Reserve Brigade	
Welsh Regiment	22nd (Reserve)		Prees Heath, September 1915	Depot companies of 17th and 18th Battalions	14th Reserve Brigade	
Welsh Regiment	23rd (Service)	Welsh Pioneers	Porthcawl, September 1915	Welsh National Executive Committee	Pioneers, 28th Division	
Black Watch (Royal Highlanders)	Did not form any locally raised battalions.					
Oxfordshire and Buckinghamshire Light Infantry	Did not form any locally raised battalions.					
Essex Regiment	13th (Service)	West Ham	West Ham, 27 December 1914	Mayor and Borough of West Ham	100th Brigade, 33rd Division	
Essex Regiment	14th (Reserve)		Brentwood, September 1915	Depot companies of 13th Battalion	23rd Reserve Brigade	
Sherwood Foresters (Nottinghamshire and Derbyshire Regiment)	15th (Service)	Nottingham	Nottingham, February 1915	Mayor and a committee	105th Brigade, 35th Division	Bantam battalion
Sherwood Foresters (Nottinghamshire and Derbyshire Regiment)	16th (Service)	Chatsworth Rifles	Derby, 16 April 1915	Duke of Devonshire and the Derbyshire T.F. Association	117th Brigade, 39th Division	
Sherwood Foresters (Nottinghamshire and Derbyshire Regiment)	17th (Service)	Welbeck Rangers	Nottingham, 1 June 1915	Mayor and a recruiting committee	117th Brigade, 39th Division	
Sherwood Foresters (Nottinghamshire and Derbyshire Regiment)	18th (Service)		Derby, 28 July 1915		121st Brigade, 40th Division	Bantam battalion
Sherwood Foresters (Nottinghamshire and Derbyshire Regiment)	19th (Reserve)		Brocklesby, August 1915	Depot companies of 15th, 16th and 17th Battalions	19th Reserve Brigade	
Loyal North Lancashire Regiment	Did not form any locally raised battalions.					
Northamptonshire Regiment	Did not form any locally raised battalions.					
Princess Charlotte of Wales's (Royal Berkshire Regiment)	Did not form any locally raised battalions.					
Queen's Own (Royal West Kent Regiment)	10th (Service)	Kent County	Maidstone, 3 May 1915	Lord Harris, Vice-Lieutenant of Kent at the request of the Army Council	123rd Brigade, 41st Division	
Queen's Own (Royal West Kent Regiment)	11th (Service)	Lewisham	Lewisham, 5 May 1915	Mayor and a local committee	122nd Brigade, 41st Division	
Queen's Own (Royal West Kent Regiment)	12th (Reserve)		February 1916	Depot companies of 11th and 12th Battalions	23rd Reserve Brigade	
King's Own (Yorkshire Light Infantry)	12th (Service)	Miners, Pioneers	Leeds, 5 September 1914	West Yorkshire Coalowners Association	Pioneers, 31st Division	
King's Own (Yorkshire Light Infantry)	13th (Reserve)	Pioneers	Ripon, October 1915	Depot companies of 12th Battalion	19th Reserve Brigade	
King's (Shropshire Light Infantry)	Did not form any locally raised battalions.					
Duke of Cambridge's Own (Middlesex Regiment)	16th (Service)	Public Schools	24 St James's Street, London, 1 September 1914	Lt Col J. J. Mackay	100th Brigade, 33rd Division	
Duke of Cambridge's Own (Middlesex Regiment)	17th (Service)	1st Football	London, 12 December 1914	Rt. Hon. W. Joynson Hicks MP	100th Brigade, 33rd Division	
Duke of Cambridge's Own (Middlesex Regiment)	18th (Service)	1st Public Works Pioneers	London, 19 January 1915	Lt Col John Ward MP	Pioneers, 33rd Division	
Duke of Cambridge's Own (Middlesex Regiment)	19th (Service)	2nd Public Works Pioneers	Hornsey, April 1915	Lt Col John Ward MP	Pioneers, 41st Division	
Duke of Cambridge's Own (Middlesex Regiment)	20th (Service)	Shoreditch	Shoreditch, 18 May 1915	Mayor and Borough of Shoreditch	118th Brigade, 39th Division	
Duke of Cambridge's Own (Middlesex Regiment)	21st (Service)	Islington	Islington, 18 May 1915	Mayor and Borough of Islington	118th Brigade, 39th Division	
Duke of Cambridge's Own (Middlesex Regiment)	22nd (Service)		Mill Hill, June 1915		121st Brigade, 40th Division	Bantam battalion
Duke of Cambridge's Own (Middlesex Regiment)	23rd (Service)	2nd Football	London, 29 June 1915	Rt. Hon. W. Joynson Hicks MP	123rd Brigade, 41st Division	
Duke of Cambridge's Own (Middlesex Regiment)	24th (Reserve)	Public Schools	Tring, October 1915	Depot companies of 16th Battalion	23rd Reserve Brigade	
Duke of Cambridge's Own (Middlesex Regiment)	25th (Reserve)		Tring, October 1915	Depot companies of 18th, 19th and 26th Battalions	23rd Reserve Brigade	
Duke of Cambridge's Own (Middlesex Regiment)	26th (Service)	3rd Public Works Pioneers	London, 9 August 1915	Lt Col John Ward MP	Pioneers, 27th Division	
Duke of Cambridge's Own (Middlesex Regiment)	27th (Reserve)		1915	Depot companies of 17th and 23rd Battalions	23rd Reserve Brigade	
Duke of Cambridge's Own (Middlesex Regiment)	28th (Reserve)		1915	Depot companies of 20th and 21st Battalions	23rd Reserve Brigade	
King's Royal Rifle Corps	16th (Service)	Church Lads Brigade	Denham, Buckinghamshire, 19 September 1914	Field Marshal Lord Grenfell	100th Brigade, 33rd Division	
King's Royal Rifle Corps	17th (Service)	British Empire League	London, 16 April 1915	British Empire League	117th Brigade, 39th Division	
King's Royal Rifle Corps	18th (Service)	Arts and Crafts	Gidea Park, Essex, 4 June 1915	Major Sir Herbert Raphael	122nd Brigade, 41st Division	
King's Royal Rifle Corps	19th (Reserve)		Bexhill, October 1915	Depot companies of 16th and 17th Battalions	24th Reserve Brigade	
King's Royal Rifle Corps	20th (Service)	British Empire League Pioneers	Green Park, London, 20 August 1915	British Empire League	Pioneers, 3rd Division	
King's Royal Rifle Corps	21st (Service)	Yeoman Rifles	Northern Command, September 1915	(Note: 21st (Service) Battalion, King's Royal Rifle Corps was formed from farmers. Two companies from Yorkshire, one from Northumberland and Durham, and one from Lincolnshire, Leicestershire and Norfolk.)	124th Brigade, 41st Division	
King's Royal Rifle Corps	22nd (Reserve)		September 1915	Depot companies of 20th Battalion	26th Reserve Brigade	
King's Royal Rifle Corps	23rd (Reserve)		Autumn 1915	Depot companies of 18th Battalion	26th Reserve Brigade	
King's Royal Rifle Corps	24th (Reserve)		Skipton, April 1916	Depot companies of 21st Battalion	21st Reserve Brigade	
Duke of Edinburgh's (Wiltshire Regiment)	Did not form any locally raised battalions.					
Manchester Regiment	16th (Service)	1st City	Manchester, 28 August 1914	Lord Mayor and City	90th Brigade, 30th Division	
Manchester Regiment	17th (Service)	2nd City	Manchester, 28 August 1914	Lord Mayor and City	90th Brigade, 30th Division	
Manchester Regiment	18th (Service)	3rd City	Manchester, 28 August 1914	Lord Mayor and City	90th Brigade, 30th Division	
Manchester Regiment	19th (Service)	4th City	Manchester, 28 August 1914	Lord Mayor and City	90th Brigade, 30th Division	
Manchester Regiment	20th (Service)	5th City	Manchester, 8 November 1914	Lord Mayor and City	91st Brigade, 30th Division	
Manchester Regiment	21st (Service)	6th City	Manchester, 13 November 1914	Lord Mayor and City	91st Brigade, 30th Division	
Manchester Regiment	22nd (Service)	7th City	Manchester, 21 November 1914	Lord Mayor and City	91st Brigade, 30th Division	
Manchester Regiment	23rd (Service)	8th City	Manchester, 21 November 1914	Lord Mayor and City	104th Brigade, 35th Division	Bantam battalion
Manchester Regiment	24th (Service)	Oldham, Pioneers (Note: Later assigned as Pioneers to the 7th Division.)	Oldham, 24 October 1914	Mayor and Town	91st Brigade, 30th Division	
Manchester Regiment	25th (Reserve)		September 1915	Depot companies of 16th, 17th and 18th Battalions	16th Reserve Brigade	
Manchester Regiment	26th (Reserve)		September 1915	Depot companies of 19th, 20th and 21st Battalions	16th Reserve Brigade	
Manchester Regiment	27th (Reserve)		September 1915	Depot companies of 22nd, 23rd and 24th Battalions	16th Reserve Brigade	
Prince of Wales's (North Staffordshire Regiment)	Did not form any locally raised battalions.					
York and Lancaster Regiment	12th (Service)	Sheffield	Sheffield, 5 September 1914	Lord Mayor and City	94th Brigade, 31st Division	
York and Lancaster Regiment	13th (Service)	1st Barnsley	Barnsley, 17 September 1914	Mayor and Town	94th Brigade, 31st Division	
York and Lancaster Regiment	14th (Service)	2nd Barnsley	Barnsley, 30 November 1914	Mayor and Town	94th Brigade, 31st Division	
York and Lancaster Regiment	15th (Reserve)		Silkstone, July 1915	Depot companies of 12th, 13th and 14th Battalions	21st Reserve Brigade	
Durham Light Infantry	18th (Service)	1st County	Cocken Hall, 10 September 1914	Col R. Burdon and a committee	93rd Brigade, 31st Division	
Durham Light Infantry	19th (Service)	2nd County	Durham, 13 January 1915	Durham Parliamentary Recruiting Committee	106th Brigade, 35th Division	Bantam battalion
Durham Light Infantry	20th (Service)	Wearside	Sunderland, 10 July 1915	Mayor and Committee	123rd Brigade, 41st Division	
Durham Light Infantry	21st (Reserve)		Cocken Hall, July 1915	Depot companies of 18th and 20th Battalions	20th Reserve Brigade	
Durham Light Infantry	22nd (Service)	3rd County Pioneers	County Durham, 1 October 1915	Durham Parliamentary Recruiting Committee	Pioneers, 8th Division	
Durham Light Infantry	23rd (Reserve)		Catterick, October 1915	Depot companies of 19th Battalion	20th Reserve Brigade	
Highland Light Infantry	14th (Service)		Hamilton, July 1915		120th Brigade, 40th Division	Bantam battalion
Highland Light Infantry	15th (Service)	1st Glasgow	Glasgow, 2 September 1914	Lord Provost and City with many recruits from Glasgow Tramways	97th Brigade, 32nd Division	
Highland Light Infantry	16th (Service)	2nd Glasgow	Glasgow, 2 September 1914	Lord Provost and City with many recruits from Glasgow Boys' Brigade	97th Brigade, 32nd Division	
Highland Light Infantry	17th (Service)	3rd Glasgow	Glasgow, 10 September 1914	Glasgow Chamber of Commerce	97th Brigade, 32nd Division	
Highland Light Infantry	18th (Service)	4th Glasgow	Glasgow, 26 February 1915	Lord Provost and City	106th Brigade, 35th Division	Bantam battalion
Highland Light Infantry	19th (Reserve)		Gailes (near Irvine, North Ayrshire), July 1915	Depot companies of 15th, 16th and 17th Battalions	18th Reserve Brigade	
Highland Light Infantry	20th (Reserve)		Ripon, October 1915	Depot companies of 18th Battalion	18th Reserve Brigade	
Seaforth Highlanders (Ross-shire Buffs, The Duke of Albany's)	Did not form any locally raised battalions.					
Gordon Highlanders	Did not form any locally raised battalions.					
Queen's Own Cameron Highlanders	Did not form any locally raised battalions.					
Royal Irish Rifles	8th (Service)	East Belfast	Belfast, September 1914	Belfast Volunteers of the Ulster Volunteer Force	107th Brigade, 36th (Ulster) Division	
Royal Irish Rifles	9th (Service)	West Belfast	Belfast, September 1914	Belfast Volunteers of the Ulster Volunteer Force	107th Brigade, 36th (Ulster) Division	
Royal Irish Rifles	10th (Service)	South Belfast	Belfast, September 1914	Belfast Volunteers of the Ulster Volunteer Force	107th Brigade, 36th (Ulster) Division	
Royal Irish Rifles	11th (Service)	South Antrim	County Antrim, September 1914	Antrim Volunteers of the Ulster Volunteer Force	108th Brigade, 36th (Ulster) Division	
Royal Irish Rifles	12th (Service)	Central Antrim	County Antrim, September 1914	Antrim Volunteers of the Ulster Volunteer Force	108th Brigade, 36th (Ulster) Division	
Royal Irish Rifles	13th (Service)	1st County Down	County Down, September 1914	County Down Volunteers of the Ulster Volunteer Force	108th Brigade, 36th (Ulster) Division	
Royal Irish Rifles	14th (Service)	Young Citizens	Belfast, September 1914	Belfast Volunteers of the Ulster Volunteer Force	109th Brigade, 36th (Ulster) Division	
Royal Irish Rifles	15th (Service)	North Belfast	Belfast, September 1914	Belfast Volunteers of the Ulster Volunteer Force	107th Brigade, 36th (Ulster) Division	
Royal Irish Rifles	16th (Service)	2nd County Down, Pioneers	County Down, September 1914	County Down Volunteers of the Ulster Volunteer Force	Pioneers, 36th (Ulster) Division	
Royal Irish Rifles	17th (Reserve)		Newcastle, County Down, March 1915	Depot companies of 8th, 9th and 10th Battalions	15th (Ulster) Reserve Brigade	
Royal Irish Rifles	18th (Reserve)		Holywood, County Down, April 1915	Depot companies of 11th and 12th Battalions	15th (Ulster) Reserve Brigade	
Royal Irish Rifles	19th (Reserve)		Newcastle, County Down, October 1915	Depot companies of 14th and 15th Battalions	15th (Ulster) Reserve Brigade	
Royal Irish Rifles	20th (Reserve)		Holywood, County Down, November 1915	Depot companies of 13th and 16th Battalions	15th (Ulster) Reserve Brigade	
Princess Victoria's (Royal Irish Fusiliers)	9th (Service)	County Armagh	September 1914	Armagh, Monaghan and Cavan Volunteers of the Ulster Volunteer Force	108th Brigade, 36th (Ulster) Division	
Princess Victoria's (Royal Irish Fusiliers)	10th (Reserve)		Lurgan, September 1915	Depot companies of 9th Battalion	15th (Ulster) Reserve Brigade	
Connaught Rangers	Did not form any locally raised battalions.					
Princess Louise's (Argyll and Sutherland Highlanders)	Did not form any locally raised battalions. (Note: 14th (Service) Battalion, Princess Louise's (Argyll and Sutherland Highlanders) was not a locally formed battalion but was assigned to the 118th Brigade, 39th Division in the Sixth New Army which was otherwise made up of Pals battalions.)					
Prince of Wales's Leinster Regiment (Royal Canadians)	Did not form any locally raised battalions.					
Royal Munster Fusiliers	Did not form any locally raised battalions.					
Royal Dublin Fusiliers	Did not form any locally raised battalions.					
Rifle Brigade (Prince Consort's Own)	16th (Service)	St. Pancras	Borough of St Pancras, 2 May 1915	Parliamentary Recruiting Committee	117th Brigade, 39th Division	
Rifle Brigade (Prince Consort's Own)	17th (Reserve)		Charrington Hall, October 1915	Depot companies of 16th Battalion	26th Reserve Brigade	

== Bibliography ==
- Becke, Major A.F. (1938). Order of Battle of Divisions Part 3A. New Army Divisions (9–26). London: His Majesty's Stationery Office.
- Becke, Major A.F. (1945). Order of Battle of Divisions Part 3B. New Army Divisions (30–41) & 63rd (RN) Division. London: His Majesty's Stationery Office.
- David Bilton, Hull Pals, 10th, 11th 12th and 13th Battalions East Yorkshire Regiment – A History of 92 Infantry Brigade, 31st Division, Barnsley: Pen & Sword, 2014, ISBN 978-1-78346-185-1.
- James, Brigadier E.A. (1978). British Regiments 1914–18. London: Samson Books Limited. ISBN 0-906304-03-2.
- Andrew Jackson, Accrington's Pals: The Full Story, Barnsley, Pen & Sword, 2013, ISBN 9781-84884-469-8.
