= James Walter Sandilands =

British Army officer (1874–1959)

Major-General James Walter Sandilands CB CMG DSO
- Born: 1874; Hampstead, London, England
- Died: 1959 (aged 84–85); Surrey, England
- Military career
- Allegiance: United Kingdom
- Branch: British Army
- Service years: 1895−1933
- Rank: Major-General
- Units: Manchester Regiment; Queen's Own Cameron Highlanders
- Commands: 35th Brigade; Commander of British Troops in South China
- Conflicts: Mahdist War; Second Boer War; World War I
- Awards: Companion of the Order of the Bath; Companion of the Order of St Michael and St George; Distinguished Service Order

Major-General James Walter Sandilands CB CMG DSO (1874–1959) was a senior British Army officer who served as Commander of British Troops in South China.

== Military career ==
Sandilands joined the Militia and was commissioned as a second lieutenant in the 3rd & 4th (6th Royal Lancashire Militia) Battalions, Manchester Regiment on 14 April 1895. He was later promoted to lieutenant in the militia battalion of the Gordon Highlanders. He transferred to the full-time regular army when he was commissioned as second lieutenant on augmentation in the Queen's Own Cameron Highlanders on 1 May 1897.

He fought in the Mahdist War in 1898, for which he was mentioned in despatches and promoted to lieutenant on 28 September 1898.

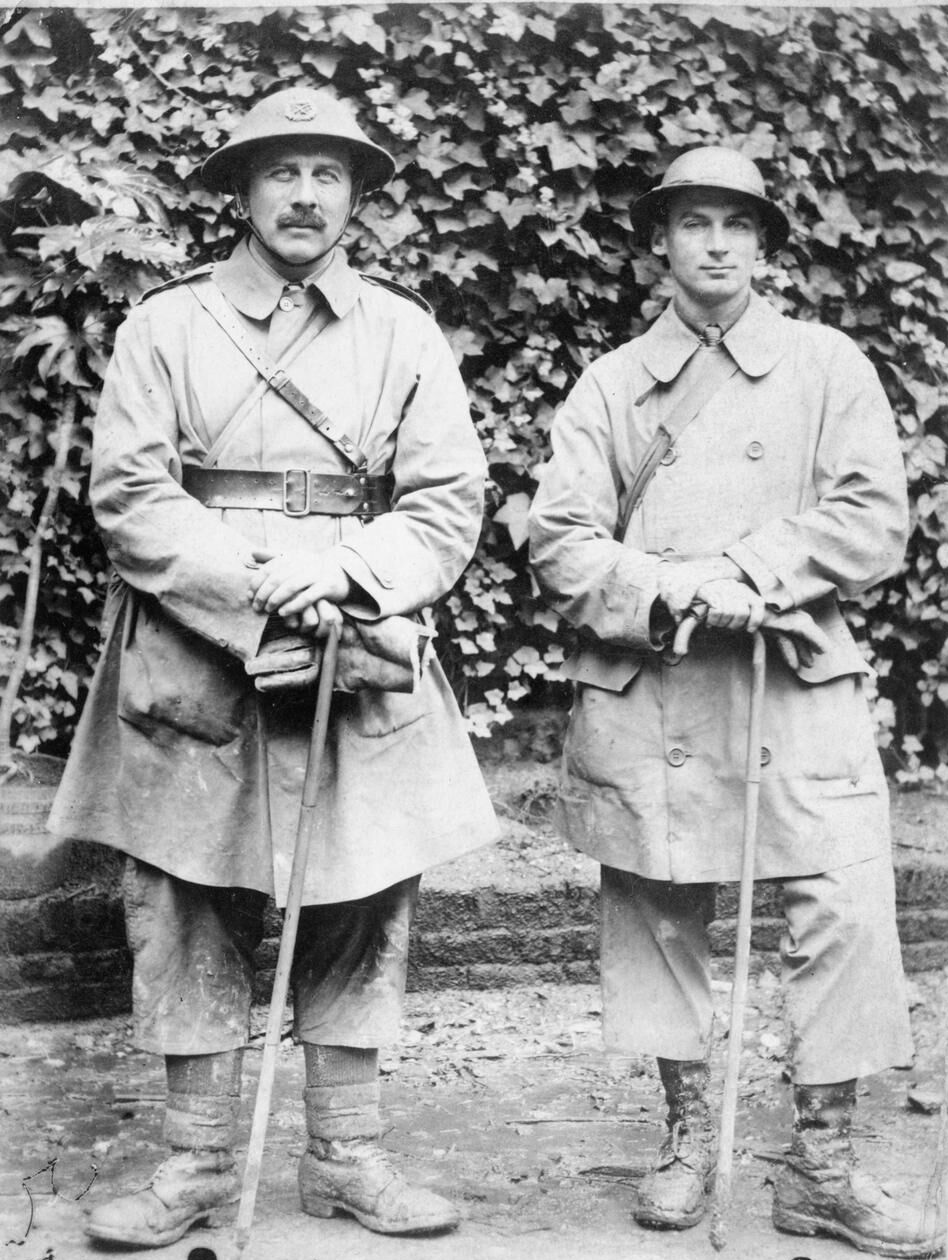
Captain Bernard Montgomery (right) with Brigadier-General J. W. Sandilands, GOC of the 104th Infantry Brigade, 35th Division. Montgomery served as brigade major with the brigade from January 1915 until early 1917.

He served in the Second Boer War with Mounted Infantry. During the war, he was present for operations in the Orange Free State from February to May 1900, then in Transvaal and the Orange River Colony during the rest of 1900. He took part in actions near Johannesburg and Pretoria in May and June 1900, and in the battles of Diamond Hill (June 1900), Wittebergen (July 1900) and Elands River (August 1900). He was wounded on 13 December 1900 during the Battle of Nooitgedacht and evacuated under fire from the battlefield by Sergeant Donald Farmer who was awarded the Victoria Cross for this act of bravery. He continued to serve in South Africa throughout the war, including in Cape Colony, and was promoted to captain on 29 May 1901.

For his service in the war, he was twice mentioned in despatches (including in the final despatch by Lord Kitchener dated 23 June 1902), received the Queen's South Africa Medal with four clasps, and the Distinguished Service Order (DSO).

On 23 October 1905 he was seconded from his regiment in order to serve on the staff and was made an officer in charge of musketry duties. He attended the Staff College, Camberley, in 1909.

On 1 May 1914 he was seconded from his regiment and appointed as a deputy assistant adjutant and quartermaster general.

Sandilands also served in World War I as a Deputy Assistant Adjutant and Quartermaster-General.

Later he became Military Attaché in Berlin. He also commanded the 104th Brigade, part of the 35th Division. He was promoted on 3 June 1918 to brevet colonel.

After being placed on half-pay in March 1924, he was placed on half-pay again on 1 May 1928 and, after being promoted on 26 May to major general, was appointed commander of British Troops in South China on 5 January 1929.

He relinquished this assignment on 3 February 1933 and was placed on half-pay.

Military offices
Preceded by Charles Luard	Commander of British Troops in South China; 1929–1932	Succeeded by Oswald Borrett
