= Accrington Pals =

Accrington Pals 11th (Service) Battalion, East Lancashire Regiment (Accrington)
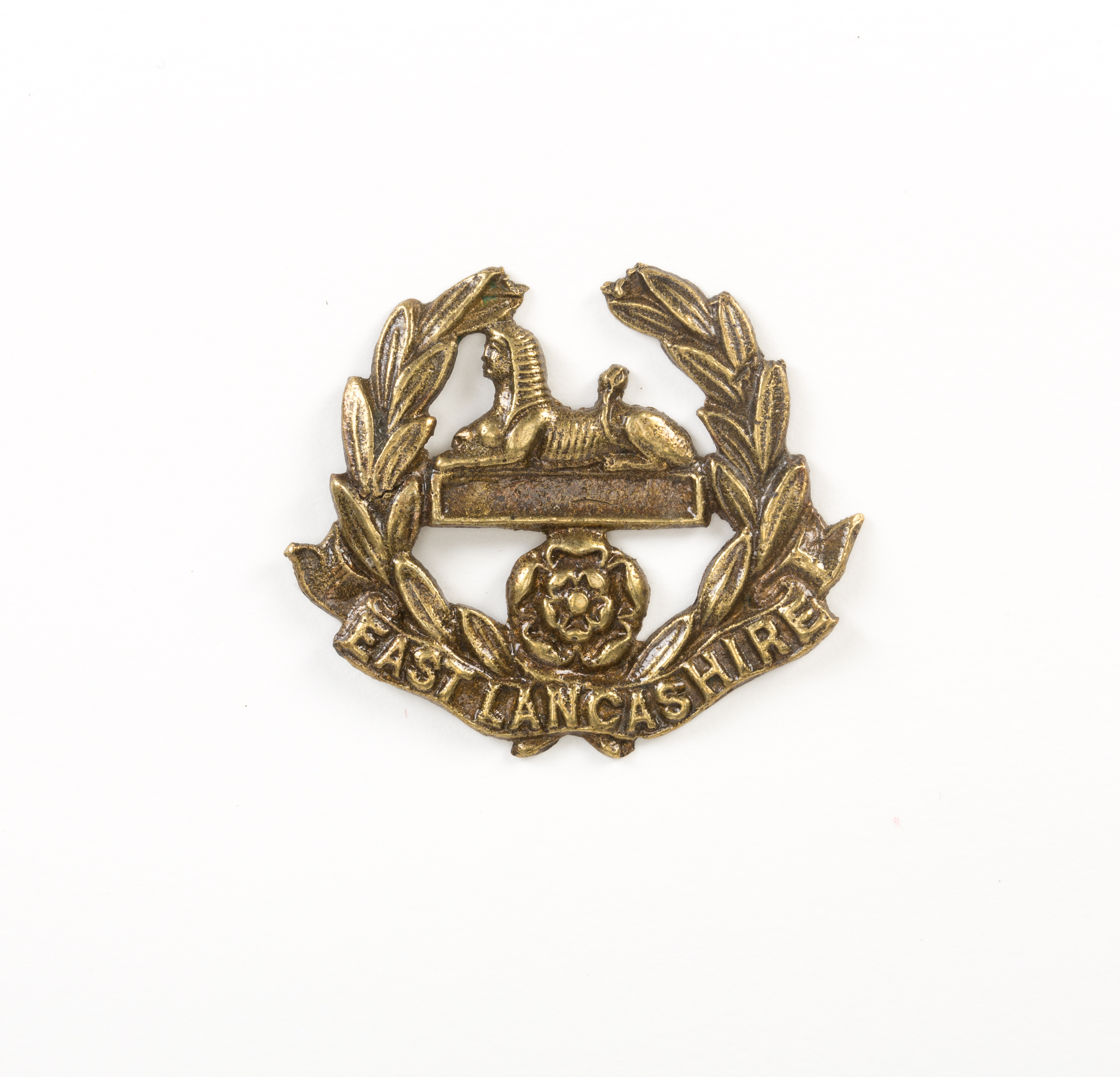
- Cap badge of the East Lancashire Regiment
- Active: 2 September 1914 – 20 November 1919
- Allegiance: United Kingdom
- Branch: New Army
- Type: Pals battalion
- Role: Infantry
- Size: Battalion
- Part of: 31st Division
- Garrison/HQ: Accrington
- Patron: Mayor and Town of Accrington
- Engagements: Battle of the Somme; Third Battle of the Scarpe; Capture of Oppy Wood; German spring offensive Battle of the Lys; Hundred Days Offensive

The Accrington Pals, officially the 11th (Service) Battalion (Accrington), East Lancashire Regiment, was a pals battalion of Kitchener's Army raised in and around the town of Accrington during the First World War.

== History ==
Recruiting was initiated by the mayor of Accrington following Lord Kitchener's call for volunteers, and it took only ten days to raise a complete battalion. The battalion's nickname is somewhat misleading since of the four 250-strong companies that made up the original battalion, only one was actually composed of men from Accrington. The rest volunteered from other nearby East Lancashire towns such as Burnley, Blackburn, and Chorley. The men from Chorley, who formed Y Company, were known as the Chorley Pals. The men from Burnley, who formed Z Company, were known as the Burnley Pals.

The Accrington Pals joined the 94th Brigade of the 31st Division, a "pals" division containing many North Country pals battalions. With the 31st Division. The division was initially deployed to Egypt in early 1916 to defend the Suez Canal from the threat of the Ottoman Empire The troopship carrying the Accrington Pals was narrowly missed by a torpedo, a fortunate miss because the ship also carried sixty tons of lyddite explosive.

The Accrington Pals next moved to France, where they first saw action in the Battle of the Somme. On the first day on the Somme, on 1 July 1916, the 31st Division was to attack the village of Serre-lès-Puisieux and form a defensive flank for the rest of the British advance. The 31st Division's attack on Serre was a complete failure although some of the Accrington Pals made it as far as the village where they were killed or captured. One of the battalion's signallers, observing from the rear, reported:

We were able to see our comrades move forward in an attempt to cross No Man's Land, only to be mown down like meadow grass. I felt sick at the sight of the carnage and remember weeping.

Approximately 720 men from the Accrington Pals went into action on 1 July; 585 men became casualties, 235 killed and 350 wounded in about half an hour. The battalion's commander, Lieutenant-Colonel A. W. Rickman, was among the wounded. A rumour spread around Accrington that only seven men had survived from the battalion, and an angry crowd surrounded the mayor's house and demanded information.

The Accrington Pals lost most of their men killed, wounded or missing within minutes of the attack at Serre on the first day of the Somme. The battalion was brought back up to strength and served for the remainder of the war, moving to the 92nd Brigade of the 31st Division in February 1918.

== 12th (Reserve) Battalion ==
The 12th (Reserve) Battalion, East Lancashire Regiment, was formed on 14 May 1915 at Chadderton Camp, Oldham, from the depot companies of 11th Battalion. This was a local reserve battalion, that is, a reserve battalion for the locally raised (pals) battalion intended to provide trained reinforcements for its parent unit. In the autumn of 1915 it was at Prees Heath Camp in the 17th Reserve Brigade.

On 1 September 1916, it transferred to the Training Reserve (TR) as the 75th Training Reserve Battalion in 17th Reserve Brigade. It was redesignated as the 233rd (Infantry) Battalion, TR, (for those who had completed basic training) on 9 July 1917, and on 23 July it joined 205th Bde of 68th Division at Herringfleet in Suffolk. On 1 November 1917 it was transferred to the King's (Liverpool Regiment) as 52nd (Graduated) Bn. Later it moved to Lowestoft, and in the spring of 1918 it was at Saxmundham. In June 1918 it moved to Henham Park, where it remained for the rest of the war. After the war it was converted into a service battalion on 8 February 1919 and sent to join the British Army of the Rhine, where it served in 14th Bde of the Lancashire Division until October 1919. It was disbanded in Germany on 13 February 1920.

== Victoria Cross ==
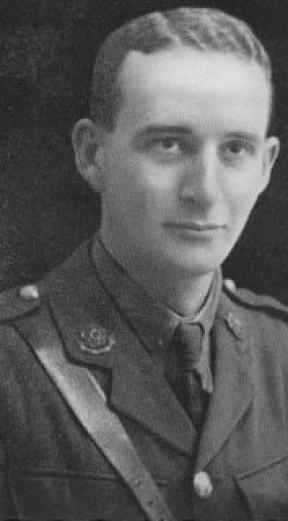
Basil Arthur Horsfall VC

The Victoria Cross is the highest and most prestigious award for gallantry in the face of the enemy that can be awarded to British and Commonwealth forces. One member of the battalion won the award. Second Lieutenant Basil Arthur Horsfall, 1st Battalion attached to the 11th Battalion, East Lancashire Regiment, won the award on 21 March 1918, between Moyenneville and Ablainzevelle, France. The award was posthumous.

== Legacy ==
A song telling their story was written and recorded by English folk singer and comedian Mike Harding. A play based on the unit, The Accrington Pals, was also later written by Peter Whelan.

== Memorial ==
A memorial to the battalion stands in the Sheffield Memorial Park in France. Built from Accrington brick and dedicated in 1991, the memorial stands close to the location of the trench line from which the Accrington Pals advanced on the first day of the Somme.

== See also ==
- List of pals battalions
- Recruitment to the British Army during the First World War

== Bibliography ==
- Maj A.F. Becke,History of the Great War: Order of Battle of Divisions, Part 2b: The 2nd-Line Territorial Force Divisions (57th–69th), with the Home-Service Divisions (71st–73rd) and 74th and 75th Divisions, London: HM Stationery Office, 1937/Uckfield: Naval & Military Press, 2007, ISBN 1-847347-39-8.
- Maj A.F. Becke,History of the Great War: Order of Battle of Divisions, Part 3b: New Army Divisions (30–41) and 63rd (R.N.) Division, London: HM Stationery Office, 1939/Uckfield: Naval & Military Press, 2007, ISBN 1-847347-41-X.
- J.B.M. Frederick, Lineage Book of British Land Forces 1660–1978, Vol I, Wakefield: Microform Academic, 1984, ISBN 1-85117-007-3.
- Andrew Jackson, Accrington's Pals: The Full Story, Barnsley, Pen & Sword, 2013, ISBN 9781-84884-469-8.
- Brig E.A. James, British Regiments 1914–18, London: Samson Books, 1978, ISBN 0-906304-03-2/Uckfield: Naval & Military Press, 2001, ISBN 978-1-84342-197-9.
- BAOR.pdf Richard A. Rinaldi, The Original British Army of the Rhine, 2006.
- Turner, William (1990). Pals: the 11th (Service) Battalion (Accrington), East Lancashire Regiment. Barnsley: The Barnsley Chronicle. ISBN 0-9507892-4-0.
