= Manchester Pals =

Alfred Leete's recruitment poster for Kitchener's Army.

The Manchester Pals were pals battalions of the British Army raised in 1914 during the Great War, formed as part of Lord Kitchener's New Armies. They were formed into eight battalions of the Manchester Regiment.

- 1st Manchester Pals became 16th (Service) Battalion, Manchester Regiment (1st City)
- 2nd Manchester Pals became 17th (Service) Battalion, Manchester Regiment (2nd City)
- 3rd Manchester Pals (Clerks' and Warehousemen's Battalion) became 18th (Service) Battalion, Manchester Regiment (3rd City)
- 4th Manchester Pals became 19th (Service) Battalion, Manchester Regiment (4th City)
- 5th Manchester Pals became 20th (Service) Battalion, Manchester Regiment (5th City)
- 6th Manchester Pals became 21st (Service) Battalion, Manchester Regiment (6th City)
- 7th Manchester Pals became 22nd (Service) Battalion, Manchester Regiment (7th City)
- 8th Manchester Pals became 23rd (Service) Battalion, Manchester Regiment (8th City)

The 16th–19th (Service) Bns constituted 90th Brigade in 30th Division and the 20th–22nd Bns, together with the 24th (Service Battalion, Manchester Regiment (Oldham Pioneers), formed 91st Brigade in the same division. The 23rd (Service) Bn was a Bantam battalion in 104th Brigade of 35th Division.

In about September 1915 three local reserve battalions were formed from the depot companies of the eight battalions, with the role of training replacements for the service battalions; they joined 16th Brigade of the Training Reserve on 1 September 1916:

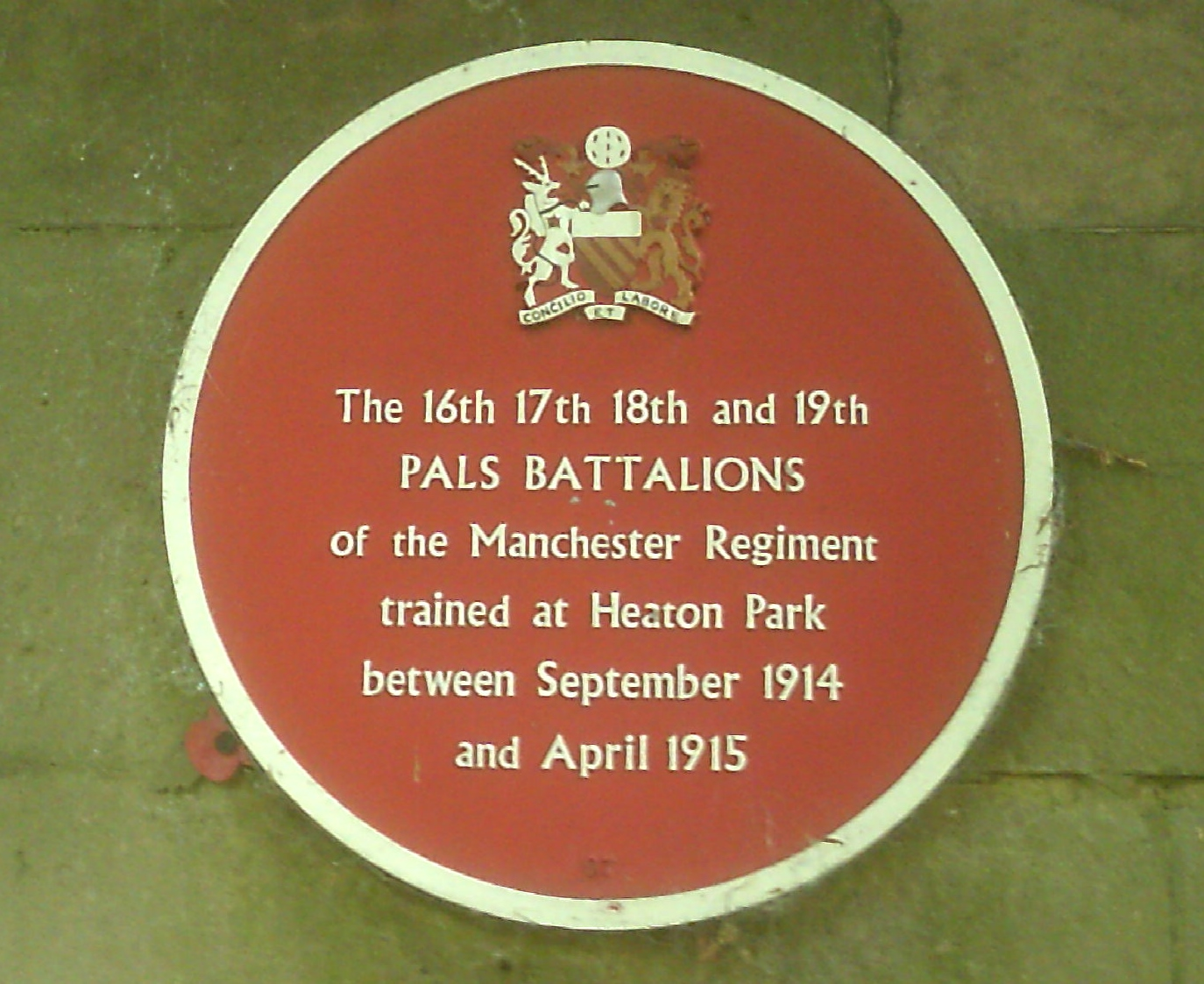
Memorial at Heaton Park.

- 25th (Reserve) Battalion, Manchester Regiment, (from 16th, 17th, 18th Bn depot companies) became 69th Training Reserve Battalion
- 26th (Reserve) Battalion, Manchester Regiment, (from 19th, 20th, 21st Bn depot companies) became 70th Training Reserve Battalion
- 27th (Reserve) Battalion, Manchester Regiment, (from 22nd, 23rd and 24th (Oldham Pioneers) Bn depot companies) became 71st Training Reserve Battalion

Almost 10,000 men enlisted in the Manchester Pals battalions, of whom 4,776 were killed. Overall, the Manchester Regiment lost about 13,000 men. In 1993, a memorial was unveiled in Heaton Park, where the 16th, 17th, 18th, and 19th battalions were trained between September 1914 and April 1915.
