= Donald Farmer =

Recipient of the Victoria Cross (1877–1956)

Donald Farmer VC
- Born: 28 May 1877; Kelso, Scottish Borders
- Died: 23 December 1956 (aged 79); Liverpool, England
- Burial place: Anfield Crematorium, Liverpool
- Military career
- Allegiance: United Kingdom
- Branch: British Army
- Rank: Lieutenant-Colonel
- Units: The Queen's Own Cameron Highlanders; King's Regiment (Liverpool)
- Conflicts: Mahdist War; Second Boer War; World War I
- Awards: Victoria Cross; Meritorious Service Medal

Lieutenant-Colonel Donald Dickson Farmer VC (28 May 1877 – 23 December 1956) was a Scottish recipient of the Victoria Cross, the highest and most prestigious award for gallantry in the face of the enemy that can be awarded to British and Commonwealth forces.

== Early military service ==
Farmer joined the Queen's Own Cameron Highlanders on 29 March 1892, and served with the 1st Battalion in the Sudan Campaign, 1898, and was present at the battles of Atbara and Khartoum.

== Details on Victoria Cross ==
Farmer was 23 years old, and a sergeant in the 1st Battalion, the Cameron Highlanders, during the Second Boer War when he won the VC on 13 December 1900 at Nooitgedacht, South Africa. His citation reads:

During the attack on General Clements Camp at Nooitgedacht, on the 13th December, 1900, Lieutenant Sandilands, Cameron Highlanders, with fifteen men, went to the assistance of a picquet which was heavily engaged, most of the men having been killed or wounded. The enemy, who were hidden by trees, opened fire on the party at a range of about 20 yards, killing two and wounding five, including Lieutenant Sandilands. Sergeant Farmer at once went to the Officer, who was perfectly helpless, and carried him away under a very heavy and close fire to a place of comparative safety, after which he returned to the firing line and was eventually taken prisoner.

== Later military career ==
He served in South Africa throughout the war, and returned home with other officers and men of the 1st Battalion Cameron Highlanders on the SS Dunera, which arrived at Southampton in October 1902.

During World War I he served with the King's Regiment (Liverpool).

== The medal ==
His Victoria Cross is displayed at the Regimental Museum of Queens Own Highlanders, Fort George, Inverness-shire, Scotland.

== Bibliography ==
- Monuments to Courage (David Harvey, 1999)
- The Register of the Victoria Cross (This England, 1997)
- Scotland's Forgotten Valour (Graham Ross, 1995)
- Victoria Crosses of the Anglo-Boer War (Ian Uys, 2000)
- Murphy, James (2008). Liverpool VCs. Pen and Sword Books. ISBN 978-1844157808.
