= 109th Brigade (United Kingdom) =

Military unit

The 109th Brigade was a formation of the British Army during the First World War. It was raised as part of the new army also known as Kitchener's Army and assigned to the 36th (Ulster) Division. The brigade served on the Western Front.

== Formation ==
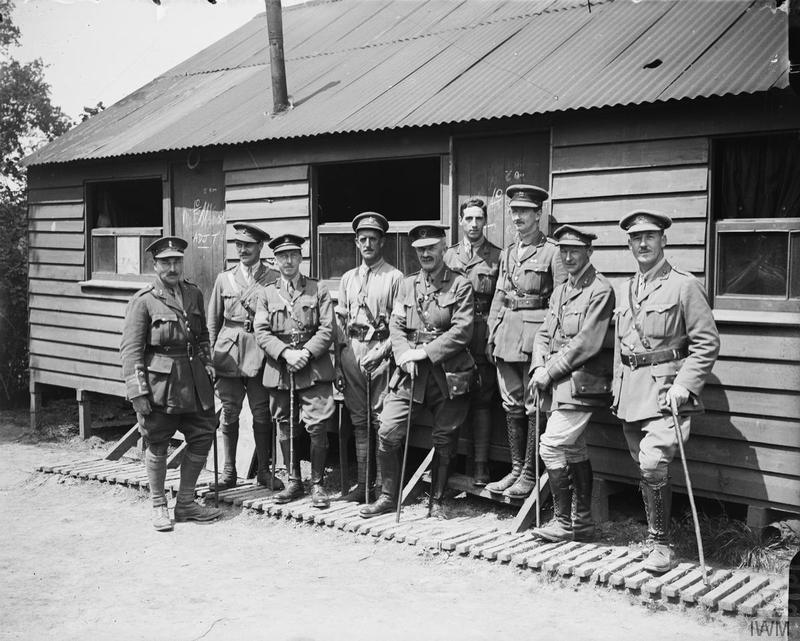
Brig-Gen Ricardo and the staff of 109th Bde after the Battle of Messines, 12 June 1917.

The infantry battalions did not all serve at once, but all were assigned to the brigade during the war.

- 9th Battalion, Royal Inniskilling Fusiliers (County Tyrone)
- 10th Battalion, Royal Inniskilling Fusiliers (County Londonderry)
- 11th Battalion, Royal Inniskilling Fusiliers (County Donegal and County Fermanagh)
- 14th Battalion, Royal Irish Rifles (Young Citizens)
- 109th Machine Gun Company
- 109th Trench Mortar Battery
- 1st Battalion, Royal Inniskilling Fusiliers
- 2nd Battalion, Royal Inniskilling Fusiliers

== Commanders ==
- Brigadier-General T. E. Hickman (14 September 1914)
- Lieutenant-Colonel W. F. Hessey (14 April 1916)
- Brigadier-General R. G. Shuter (14 May 1916)
- Brigadier-General A. St. Q. Ricardo (13 January 1917)
- Lieutenant-Colonel A. C. Pratt (2 February 1917)
- Brigadier-General A. St. Q. Ricardo (1 March 1917)
- Lieutenant-Colonel N. G. Burnand (12 December 1917)
- Brigadier-General W. F. Hessey (23 December 1917)
- Lieutenant-Colonel J. E. Knott (16 April 1918)
- Brigadier-General E. Vaughan (21 April 1918)
- Brigadier-General W. F. Hessey (17 May 1918)
