= 91st Brigade (United Kingdom) =

- Active: 19 November 1914–10 April 1915; 27 April 1915–1919; 1950–1956
- Allegiance: United Kingdom
- Branch: New Army
- Type: Infantry
- Size: Brigade
- Part of: 30th Division; 7th Division
- Engagements: Battle of the Somme; Second Battle of Bullecourt; Third Battle of Ypres; Battle of Vittorio Veneto

The 91st Brigade was an infantry formation of the British Army during World War I. It was raised as part of 'Kitchener's Army' and was assigned to the 30th Division. After the original formation was converted into a reserve brigade, the number was transferred to a brigade of 'Manchester Pals'. The brigade landed in France at the end of 1915 and was transferred to the Regular 7th Division. It saw action at the Somme, Arras, and Ypres before being sent to the Italian Front, where it took part in the final Battle of Vittorio Veneto. The brigade's number was briefly revived during the 1950s.

== Original 91st Brigade ==
Alfred Leete's recruitment poster for Kitchener's Army.

On 6 August 1914, less than 48 hours after Britain's declaration of war, Parliament sanctioned an increase of 500,000 men for the Regular British Army. The newly-appointed Secretary of State for War, Earl Kitchener of Khartoum, issued his famous call to arms: 'Your King and Country Need You', urging the first 100,000 volunteers to come forward. This group of six divisions with supporting arms became known as Kitchener's First New Army, or 'K1'. The K2 and K3 battalions, brigades and divisions followed soon afterwards. So far, the battalions had all been formed at the depots of their parent regiments, but recruits had also been flooding in to the Special Reserve (SR) battalions (the former Militia). These were deployed at their war stations in coastal defence where they were training and equipping reservists to provide reinforcement drafts to the Regular Army fighting overseas. The SR battalions were soon well above their establishment strength and on 8 October 1914 the War Office (WO) ordered each SR battalion to use the surplus to form a service battalion of the 4th New Army ('K4'). In November K4 battalions were organised into 18 brigades numbered from 89 to 106 and formed into the 30th–35th Divisions.

Initially, the K4 units remained in the coast defences alongside their parent SR battalions. On 19 November 1914 the composition of 91st Brigade in 30th Division was finalised as:

- 9th (Service) Battalion, Lincolnshire Regiment, formed at Lincoln
- 11th (Service) Battalion, Duke of Wellington's Regiment, formed at Halifax
- 14th (Service) Battalion, Sherwood Foresters, formed at Lichfield
- 14th (Service) Battalion, Manchester Regiment, formed at Lichfield

On 7 December Brigadier-General F.C. Godley was appointed to command the brigade. The units began training for active service, but the lack of uniforms, weapons, equipment and instructors that had been experienced by the K1–K3 units was even greater for those of K4, and by April 1915 their training was still at an elementary stage. On 10 April 1915 the War Office decided to convert the K4 battalions into reserve units, to provide drafts for the K1–K3 battalions in the same way that the SR was doing for the Regular battalions. The K4 divisions were broken up and the brigades were renumbered: 91st Brigade became 3rd Reserve Brigade.

== New 91st Brigade ==
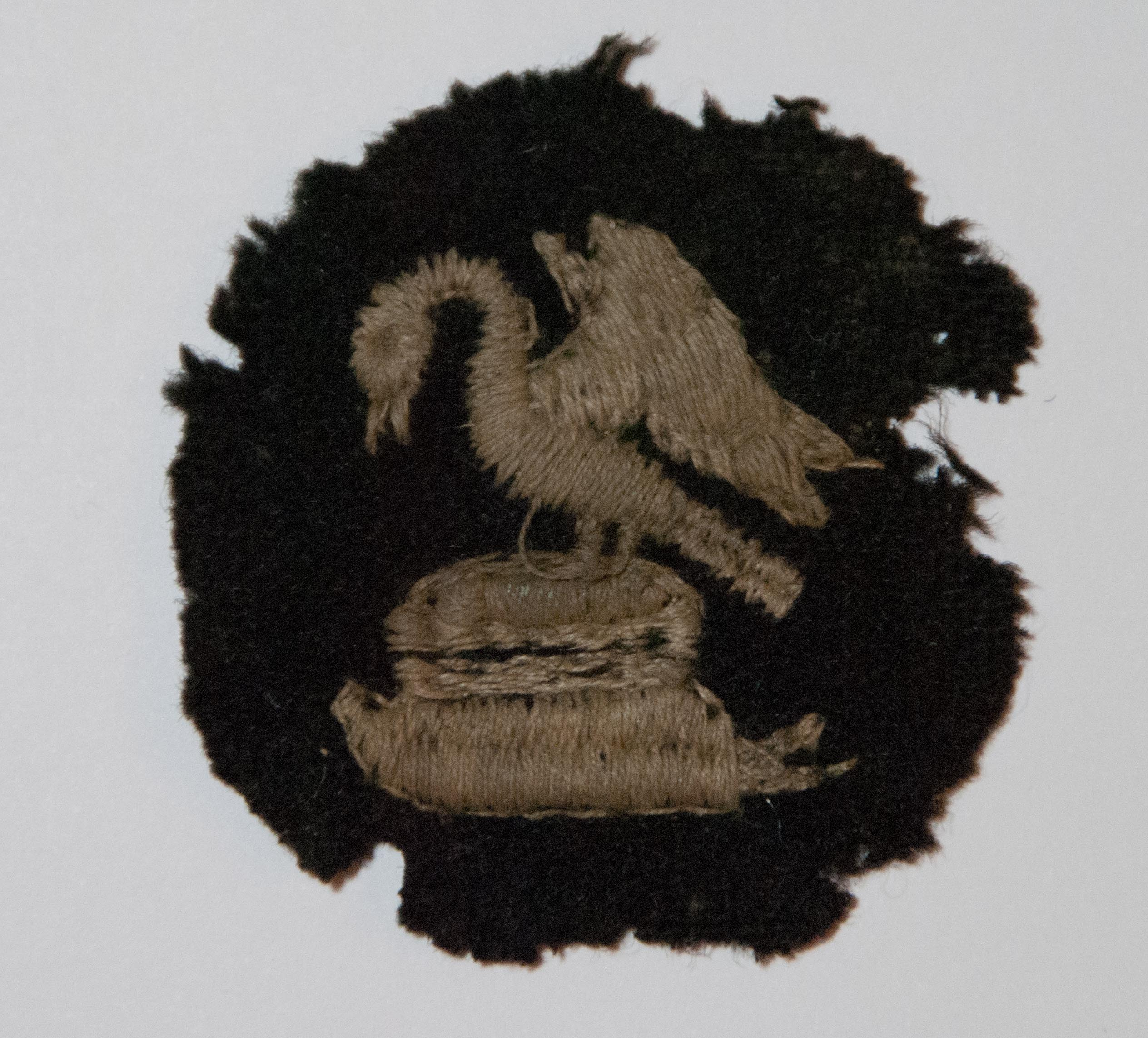
Formation sign of the 30th Division, based on the Earl of Derby's family crest

Meanwhile, the K5 units had been forming since late 1914. These were largely raised by local initiative rather than at regimental depots, and were known as 'Pals battalions'. The first six K5 divisions (37–42) and their constituent brigades were given the numbers of the disbanded K4 formations on 27 April 1915. The new 91st Brigade had been raised on 10 December 1914 as 126th Bde of 42nd Division but was now transferred to the new 30th Division (former 37th Division), bringing together the Pals battalions raised from the cities of Liverpool and Manchester The brigade's original infantry units were 'Manchester Pals' battalions, which had been recruited by the Lord Mayor and City of Manchester in November 1914:

- 20th (Service) Battalion, Manchester Regiment (5th City)
- 21st (Service) Battalion, Manchester Regiment (6th City)
- 22nd (Service) Battalion, Manchester Regiment (7th City)
- 23rd (Service) Battalion, Manchester Regiment (8th City)

However the 23rd (8th City) Battalion was a 'Bantam battalion', composed of men between the heights of 5 foot (152 cm) and 5 foot 3 inches (160 cm), and in May 1915 it was transferred to the 35th Division composed of Bantams and replaced in 91st Bde by 24th (Service) Battalion, Manchester Regiment (Oldham), raised by the Mayor and Town of Oldham on 24 October 1914.

The Manchester and Liverpool Pals had largely been raised by the initiative of Edward Stanley, 17th Earl of Derby and the 30th Division was sometimes known as 'Lord Derby's Own', or more disparagingly as the 'Derby Family Retainers'. The divisional sign was based on the Stanley family crest.

After initial training at Morecambe the brigade joined the rest of 30th Division at Belton Park outside Grantham soon after it was renumbered. Training was hampered by the same lack of equipment as the other Kitchener units, but on 14 September 1915 30th Division moved to Larkhill on Salisbury Plain for final battle training. On 31 October it was ordered to France to join the British Expeditionary Force (BEF) fighting on the Western Front. Before leaving it was inspected by the Earl of Derby. It began entraining for the embarkation ports on 6 November (91st Bde sailing from Folkestone to Boulogne) and on 12 November it completed its concentration at Ailly-le-Haut-Clocher in the Somme sector.

BEF policy was to even up the experience between its New Army and Regular Army formations by exchanging brigades and then distributing the experienced Regular battalions through the New Army divisions. In this way 21st Brigade from 7th Division replaced 91st Brigade in 30th Division on its arrival in France. On moving to 7th Division on 20 December, 91st Brigade exchanged 23rd and 24th Manchesters for two battalions of 22nd Bde, giving it the following organisation for the remainder of the war:

=== Order of Battle ===
- 2nd Battalion, Queen's (Royal West Surrey Regiment)
- 1st Battalion, South Staffordshire Regiment
- 21st (Service) Battalion, Manchester Regiment (5th City) – transferred to 25th Division 13 September 1918
- 22nd (Service) Battalion, Manchester Regiment (6th City)
- 4th Battalion, Cameron Highlanders –transferred to 51st (Highland) Division 7 January 1916
- 91st Brigade Machine Gun (MG) Company – joined from England 14 March 1916; transferred to No 7 Battalion, Machine Gun Corps, 1 April 1918''
- 91st Brigade Trench Mortar (TM) Battery – formed May 1916

=== Service ===
91st Brigade spent the remainder of the war as part of 7th Division, seeing action at the following battles and engagements:

==== 1916 ====
- Battle of the Somme:

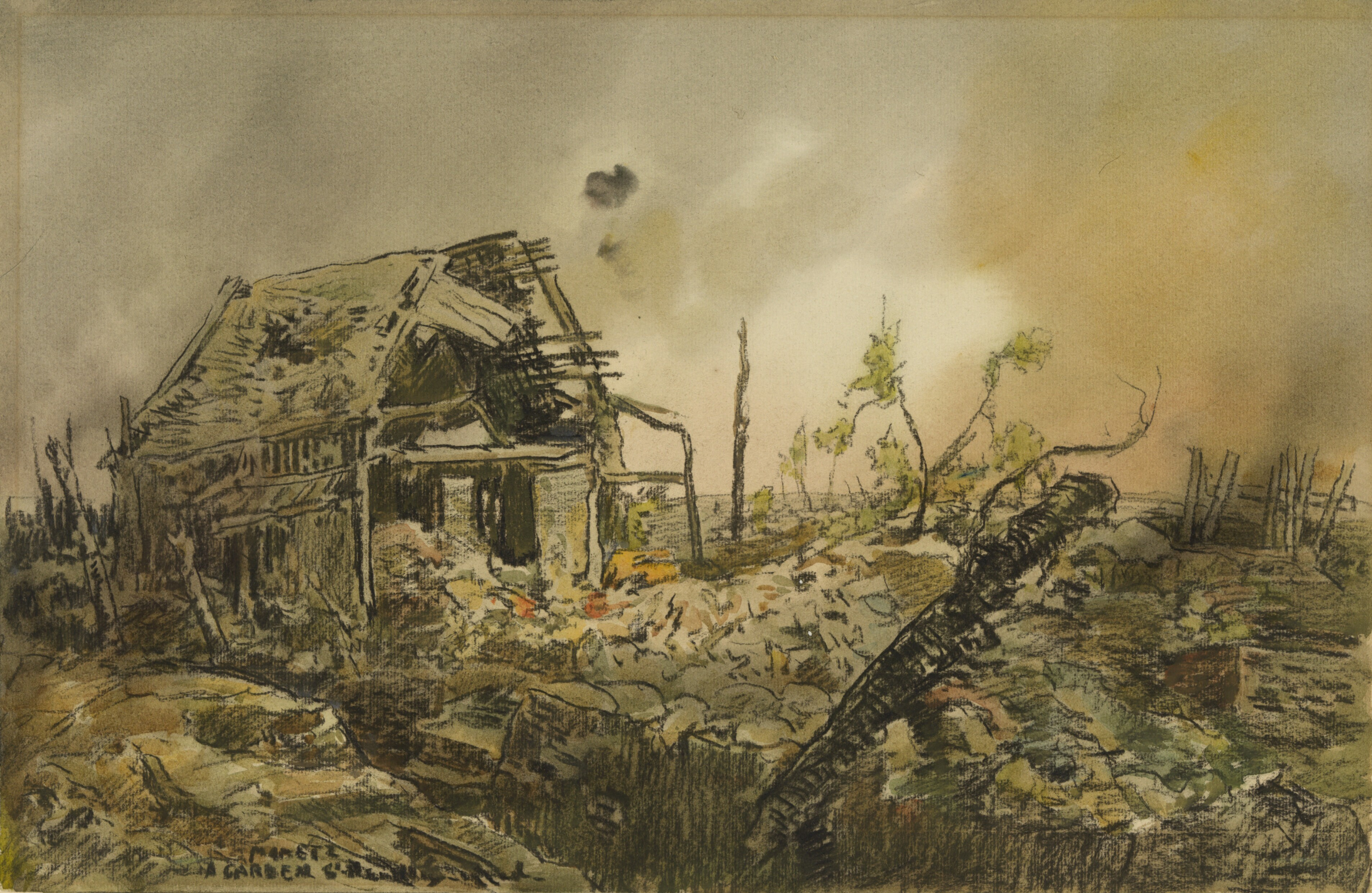
A ruined garden at Mametz, depicted by Edward Handley-Read.

  - 7th Division's task for the First day on the Somme (1 July) was the Capture of Mametz. 91st Brigade, in its first offensive action, was given two successive objectives, which involved capturing a number of trenches up the east side of the village. Attacking on the division's right, 91st Bde led off with 22nd Manchesters (right) and 2nd South Staffs (left), with a company of 21st Manchesters 'mopping up' behind them. Leaving their assembly trenches at 07.27, three minutes ahead of 'zero', they crossed the British front line at 07.31 and then set off across the 100–200 yards (91–183 m) of No man's land. Within 15 minutes 22nd Manchesters had crossed Bulgar Trench, Bulgar Support Trench and Black Trench, which the company of 21st Manchesters cleared behind them; the South Staffs were close to the south-east corner of Mametz village. However, enemy opposition began to increase: the South Staffs were checked by machine gun fire, and although 22nd Manchesters reached Bucket Trench they had suffered appreciable casualties, and resistance stiffened as they approached their first objective, Dantzig Alley. By 09.00, the Manchesters had been pushed back from Dantzig Alley and were consolidating in Bucket Trench, while the South Staffs were holding out along the hedges outside the village, where they were reinforced by two more companies of 21st Manchesters. After a renewed bombardment by the divisional artillery, the reinforced South Staffs attacked again and soon after midday had reached the north-east corner of the village. A further advance left their flanks exposed, so about 15.00 they fell back to hold Mametz and Dantzig Alley. Meanwhile the 22nd Manchesters had made some progress against Dantzig Alley, but the decisive moment was when 2nd Queen's came up from reserve. First, A and C Companies thickened up the firing line, then B and D Companies advanced and took the rest of Dantzig Alley and Fritz Trench, with numerous prisoners. 22nd Manchesters was then able to push on to take Bright Alley. With Fritz Trench cleared, the South Staffs and 21st Manchesters could attack out of Mametz and take Bunny Trench and Bunny Alley. By 20.00, 91st Bde had consolidated all of its second objectives and taken hundreds of prisoners, despite serious casualties. Although 7th Division had not secured all its objectives, its attack had been one of the few successes on a very bad day for the BEF. 91st Brigade captured and consolidated some additional trenches next day.
  - Battle of Bazentin Ridge (14–17 July): Coming up from reserve, 91st Bde advanced into High Wood, but the gains could not be held.
  - 91st Brigade fought off a German counter-attack in front of Delville Wood on 31 August.
  - Battle of Guillemont (3–7 September): 91st Brigade was in reserve, but elements supported the attack on Ginchy.

==== 1917 ====
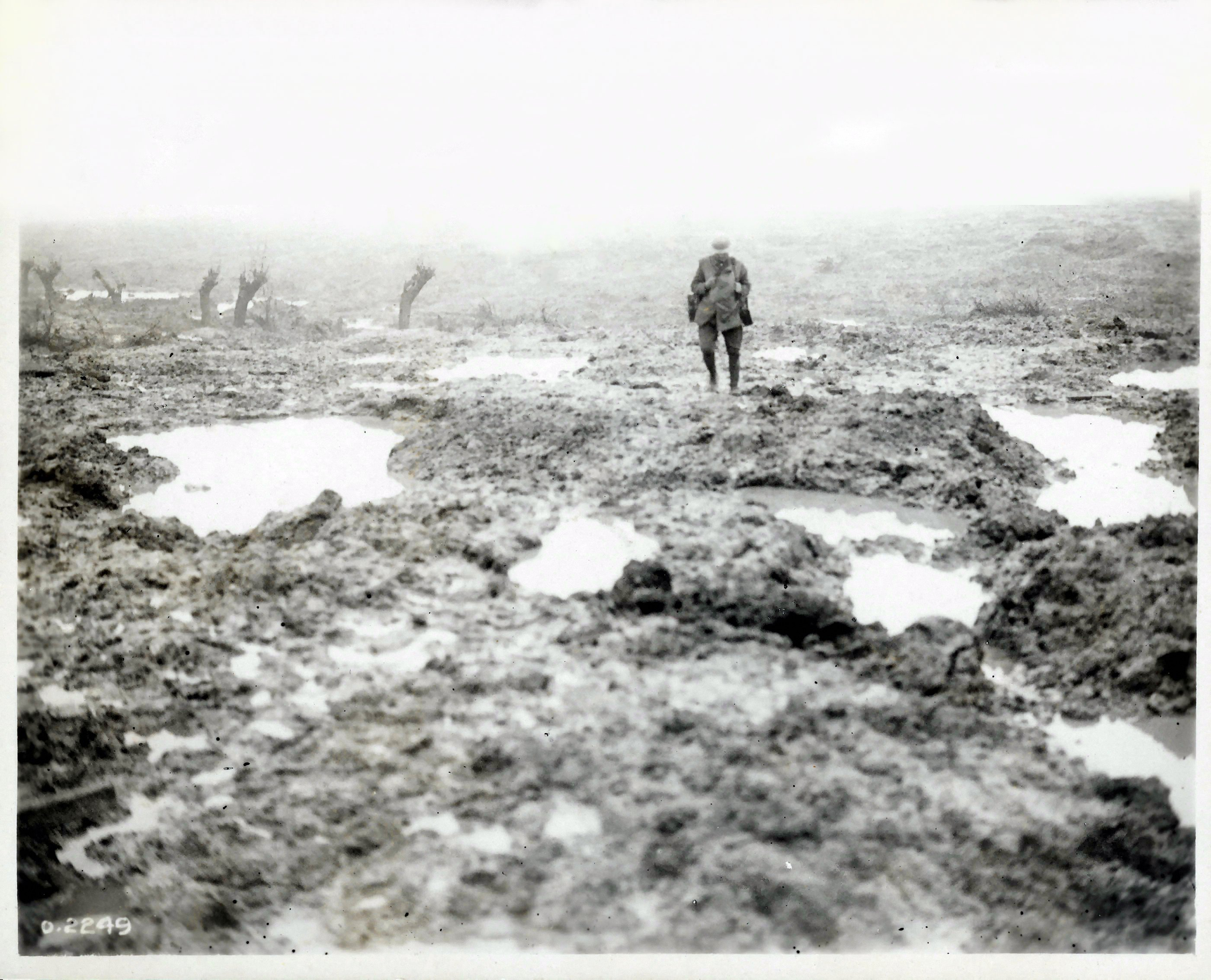
Battlefield conditions during the Second Battle of Passchendaele.

- Operations on the Ancre, January–March 1917: On 10 January 91st Bde captured Munich Trench on the Beaumont-Hamel spur.
- German retreat to the Hindenburg Line (Operation Alberich): On 24 February patrols of 91st Bde found the enemy trenches opposite to be empty, and the brigade led the initial pursuit through Serre. It failed to capture Bucquoy on 14 March, but by 2 April the division had closed up to and captured the Hindenburg Line outposts.
- Second Battle of Bullecourt: 91st Brigade attacked on 12 and 13 May with little success, during which Brig-Gen Cumming was relieved of command of the brigade.
- Third Battle of Ypres:
  - Battle of Broodseinde: A deliberate attack on 4 October saw 91st Bde advance behind an effective creeping barrage to the edge of the Gheluvelt Plateau, where they observed the Germans streaming away down the slope in front of them, and took hundreds of demoralised prisoners.
  - Second Battle of Passchendaele (26–29 October): By now the weather had broken. 7th Division attempted to attack down the Menin Road towards the village of Gheluvelt; it made little progress and casualties were heavy. Even the Commander-in-Chief, Sir Douglas Haig, acknowledged that the division was 'really engulfed in mud in some places when they attacked Gheluvelt. Rifles could not be used'.

On 10 November the division was warned that it was to move to the Italian Front. Entrainment began on 17 November and by 28 November the divisional concentration at Legnano was almost complete The division then advanced to the Piave Sector. It moved to the Asiago Sector in March 1918.

==== 1918 ====
- Raids on the Asiago Plateau: 91st Brigade was engaged in raids on the Austrian lines, particularly on 17/18 April and 8/9 August.
- Battle of Vittorio Veneto:
  - Passage of the Piave: 91st Brigade crossed by pontoon bridges on the night of 26/27 October and attacked across the island of Grave di Papadopoli the following morning, crossing the defended bund and pushing forward through ruined villages and fortified farms despite the lack of success of flanking formations, taking hundreds of prisoners until it reached the extreme range of its covering artillery. Next day, organised as a brigade group with mounted Yeomanry, cyclists, field artillery and an Italian mountain artillery battery, it advanced rapidly. On forced a passage across the River Monticano and advanced rapidly to capture Cimetta.
  - Crossing of the Tagliamento: 7th Division waded across the river unopposed on 4 November before the Armistice of Villa Giusti came into effect later that day,

The day after the Armistice, 7th Division was withdrawn to the Trissino area, where demobilisation got under way. 22nd Manchesters were chosen as one of four British battalions to remain in Italy, and it was kept up to strength with men enlisted after 1916, volunteers, and recruits from the UK. The battalion was later stationed at Innsbruck in Austria.

=== Commanders ===
The following commanded the brigade during the war:

- Brig-Gen F.J. Kempster, DSO, from 1 January 1915
- Brig-Gen John Minshull-Ford, from 3 February 1916
- Brig-Gen Hanway Cumming, from 20 November 1916
- Colonel W.W. Norman, acting from 12 May 1917
- Brig-Gen R.T. Pelly, from 16 May 1917

== 1950s ==
The brigade's number was reactivated in 1950 as the 91st Lorried Infantry Brigade, until 1956 when it was redesignated the 12th Infantry Brigade.

=== Commanders ===
The following officers commanded the brigade during its relatively brief existence:

- Brigadier Frederick Stephens: December 1950-May 1952
- Brigadier David Russell Morgan: May 1952-March 1953
- Brigadier Graham Peddie: March 1953-March 1956
