= 92nd Brigade (United Kingdom) =

- Active: 5 November 1914–10 April 1915; 27 April 1915–20 May 1919
- Country: United Kingdom
- Branch: New Army
- Type: Infantry
- Size: Brigade
- Part of: 31st Division
- Engagements: Battle of the Somme; Battle of the Ancre; Battle of Arras; Capture of Oppy Wood; German spring offensive Hundred Days Offensive

The 92nd Brigade (92 Bde) was an infantry formation of the British Army during World War I. It was raised as part of 'Kitchener's Army' and was assigned to the 31st Division. After the original formation was converted into a reserve brigade, the number was transferred to a brigade composed volunteer battalions raised in the city of Kingston upon Hull (the Hull Pals) for 'Kitchener's Army'. It first served in Egypt defending the Suez Canal between January and March 1916. It then left for the Western Front where it was at Serre on the first day of the Battle of the Somme in 1916, though its battalions escaped the worst of the disaster. It continued to serve on the Western Front for the rest of the war, including hard fighting at Oppy Wood, against the German spring offensive and in the final Hundred Days Offensive.

== Original 92nd Brigade ==
Alfred Leete's recruitment poster for Kitchener's Army.

On 6 August 1914, less than 48 hours after Britain's declaration of war, Parliament sanctioned an increase of 500,000 men for the Regular British Army. The newly appointed Secretary of State for War, Earl Kitchener of Khartoum, issued his famous call to arms: 'Your King and Country Need You', urging the first 100,000 volunteers to come forward. This group of six divisions with supporting arms became known as Kitchener's First New Army, or 'K1'.

The K2 and K3 battalions, brigades and divisions followed soon afterwards. So far, the battalions had all been formed at the depots of their parent regiments, but recruits had also been flooding in to the Special Reserve (SR) battalions (the former Militia). These were deployed at their war stations in coastal defence where they were training and equipping reservists to provide reinforcement drafts to the Regular Army fighting overseas. The SR battalions were soon well above their establishment strength and on 8 October 1914 the War Office (WO) ordered each SR battalion to use the surplus to form a service battalion of the 4th New Army ('K4'). In November K4 battalions were organised into 18 brigades numbered from 89 to 106 and formed into the 30th–35th Divisions.

Initially, the K4 units remained in the coast defences alongside their parent SR battalions. On 5 November 1914 the composition of 92nd Brigade in 31st Division was finalised as:

- 14th (Service) Battalion, King's Royal Rifle Corps, formed at Sheerness, Kent
- 15th (Service) Battalion, King's Royal Rifle Corps, formed at Sheerness
- 14th (Service) Battalion, Rifle Brigade, formed at Southend-on-Sea, Essex
- 15th (Service) Battalion, Rifle Brigade, formed at Southend

The brigade concentrated around Southend and Westcliff-on-Sea, and on 1 December Brigadier-General G.H.C. Colomb was appointed to command it. The units began training for active service, but the lack of uniforms, weapons, equipment and instructors that had been experienced by the K1–K3 units was even greater for those of K4, and by April 1915 their training was still at an elementary stage. On 10 April 1915 the War Office decided to convert the K4 battalions into reserve units, to provide drafts for the K1–K3 battalions in the same way that the SR was doing for the Regular battalions. The K4 divisions were broken up and the brigades were renumbered: 92nd Brigade became 4th Reserve Brigade.

== New 92nd Brigade ==
The flood of volunteers responding to Kitchener's call to action had overwhelmed the ability of the army to absorb and organise them, and by the time the Fifth New Army (K5) was authorised on 10 December 1914, many of its constituent units were being organised as 'Pals battalions' under the auspices of mayors and corporations of towns up and down the country. 113th Brigade of 38th Division consisted of four battalions (the Hull Pals) that had been raised at Kingston upon Hull on the initiative of Charles Wilson, 2nd Baron Nunburnholme, as Lord-Lieutenant of the East Riding of Yorkshire and President of the East Riding Territorial Association. This was unusual because most of the county Territorial Associations were fully engaged with recruiting and equipping their existing Territorial Force (TF) units and had no time for the early New Army units. By contrast, Lord Nunburnholme and the East Riding TA were simultaneously raising the 1st Hull Heavy Battery, Royal Garrison Artillery for the 11th (Northern) Division of K1, and in 1915 also raised the 124th (2nd Hull) and 146th (3rd Hull) Heavy Batteries and the 31st (Hull) Divisional Ammunition Column.

The first pattern of formation sign worn by 31st Division until 1917.

The four Hull Pals battalions were assigned to the East Yorkshire Regiment as the 10th–13th (Service) Battalions. The first six K5 divisions (37–42) and their constituent brigades were given the numbers of the disbanded K4 formations on 27 April 1915. Thus 113th Brigade of 37th Division became the new 92nd Brigade in 31st Division, with the following organisation:

- 10th (Service) Battalion, East Yorkshire Regiment (1st Hull) – the 'Hull Commercials'
- 11th (Service) Battalion, East Yorkshire Regiment (2nd Hull) – the 'Hull Tradesmen'
- 12th (Service) Battalion, East Yorkshire Regiment (3rd Hull) – the 'Hull Sportsmen'; disbanded 8 February 1918
- 13th (Service) Battalion, East Yorkshire Regiment (4th Hull) – the 'T'others'; disbanded 8 February 1918
- 92/1 and 92/2 Trench Mortar Batteries (TMBs) – formed on 11 April 1916; became a single battery by 12 June 1916
- 92nd Brigade Machine Gun Company, Machine Gun Corps – joined on 20 May 1916; transferred to 31st Divisional Machine Gun Battalion 3 March 1918
- 11th (Accrington Pals) Battalion, East Lancashire Regiment – transferred from 94th Brigade 11 February 1918

== Service ==
Local training for the Hull Pals ended in late May and early June when the units of 31st Division began to assemble at South Camp, Ripon, where brigade training began in earnest. Musketry training was finally begun in August, and in September the division moved to Hurdcott Camp at Fovant where the brigade received SMLE service rifles and carried out final intensive battle training on Salisbury Plain.

=== Egypt ===
On 29 November 1915 the division received warning orders to join the British Expeditionary Force in France, and advance parties set out for the embarkation ports of Folkestone and Southampton. At the last minute, the destination was changed to Egypt, the advance parties were recalled, and on 7 December the troops embarked at Devonport.

The division reached Port Said between 24 December and 23 January 1916 and went into the Suez Canal defences at Qantara. On 26 February orders arrived to reverse the process and on 1 March the division began re-embarking at Port Said. It unloaded at Marseille between 6 and 16 March and then concentrated in the Somme area as part of the BEF. It remained on the Western Front for the rest of the war.

=== Serre ===
The brigade was first introduced to trench warfare on 21 March by groups being attached to the 36th (Ulster) Division in the line. On 28 March the 10th and 11th Bns relieved Ulster battalions in front of Beaumont-Hamel and Y Ravine, with 12th and 13th Bns in support. Although this was a quiet sector of the line, the battalions suffered their first casualties during this short tour, mainly from German Minenwerfers (trench mortars). Shortly afterwards 31st Division formed its own light trench mortar batteries (TMBs), with the Hull Pals contributing men to 92/1 and 92/2 TMBs for 92 Bde. 10th Battalion also provided working parties to assist the 252nd Tunnelling Company, Royal Engineers, digging the Hawthorn Ridge mine that was to be exploded to launch the forthcoming Battle of the Somme. Over the next weeks the battalions took their turns in the routine of trench holding, working parties, patrolling and trench raiding, with a constant drain on manpower from shelling and snipers.

92 Brigade was to be in support of 31st Division's assault on the first day of the Battle (1 July). It held the front line trenches during the British bombardment in the days leading up to the battle, suffering significant casualties from the German counter-bombardment (about 100 killed and wounded for 10th Bn alone). The night before the battle, working parties of 10th Bn were out in No man's land cutting lanes through the British barbed wire for the assaulting troops to pass through. It then withdrew into the support trenches, leaving D Company to hold the front line while the assault went in. 93 and 94 Brigades went 'over the top' at 07.30 on 1 July, 10 minutes after the explosion of the nearby Hawthorn Ridge mine had alerted the enemy. Their objective was the village of Serre. The advancing lines were almost annihilated by German machine guns and shellfire, and only a few parties got into the enemy front line, where they remained pinned down all day.

31st Division found it impossible to get any support across the fire-swept No man's land for the rest of the day. 92 Brigade was ordered to renew the attack with two battalions during the night. Luckily, this order was cancelled: even if the brigade could have been brought up through the shattered communication and jumping-off trenches, which were full of dead and wounded, there were no British troops left in the German positions. D Company of 10th Bn had held the British trenches all day and were exhausted, but continued to hold them overnight, stationed in the reserve trench with an outpost in the front line. The brigade had been lucky, and only suffered a handful of casualties during the day.

On 2 July the shattered division was pulled out of the line and sent north to a quiet sector for rest and refit, though there was the usual trickle of casualties associated with trench holding and raiding.

=== Ancre ===
The Somme Offensive was still going on at the end of October when 31st Division returned to the sector for the Battle of the Ancre, which was to be the last big operation of the year. Serre had still not been taken, and 92 Bde was assigned to the attack alongside 3rd Division (the rest of 31st Division was still too shattered to take part). A 48-hour preliminary bombardment began on 11 November, and the brigade moved into the trenches on the night of 12/13, along communication trenches clogged with mud. Zero hour was 05.30 on 13 November, and 12th and 13th East Yorks led the way up the slope towards Serre, with 11th Bn in close support and 10th providing flank guards and carrying parties. Fog, light rain and a smokescreen reduced visibility to a few yards, and initially the two battalions had little difficulty, but 3rd Division on their right made no progress. Small-scale fighting went on all day, and Private John Cunningham of 12th Bn won a Victoria Cross (VC) for fighting on alone when all the rest of his team of bombers became casualties. A Lewis gun team from 10th Bn stopped an attack on the left flank of 12th Bn. By the end of the day both battalions had been driven back to their starting positions. The brigade suffered over 800 casualties, mostly in the two attacking battalions.

The Hull Pals remained on the Ancre through the winter of 1916–17, following up the Germans when they retired to the Hindenburg Line in the Spring of 1917.

Oppy Wood, 1917. Evening by John Nash

=== Oppy Wood ===
On 8 April 1917, 92 Bde left the Ancre and moved to the Arras sector where the Battle of Arras began the next day. After a period of training and trench-holding, the brigade moved into assembly trenches opposite Oppy during the night of 2/3 May, under shellfire. The British creeping barrage started at 03.45 and the brigade set off in four waves, in the dark and mist, into severe machine gun fire from Oppy Wood. All three attacking battalions, 10th, 11th and 12th, were held up. The officers, including 2nd Lieutenant Jack Harrison, reorganised their men for a second attempt. This too failed, but Harrison dashed on alone to try to silence the machine gun that was holding up his men. He was killed and later awarded a posthumous VC.

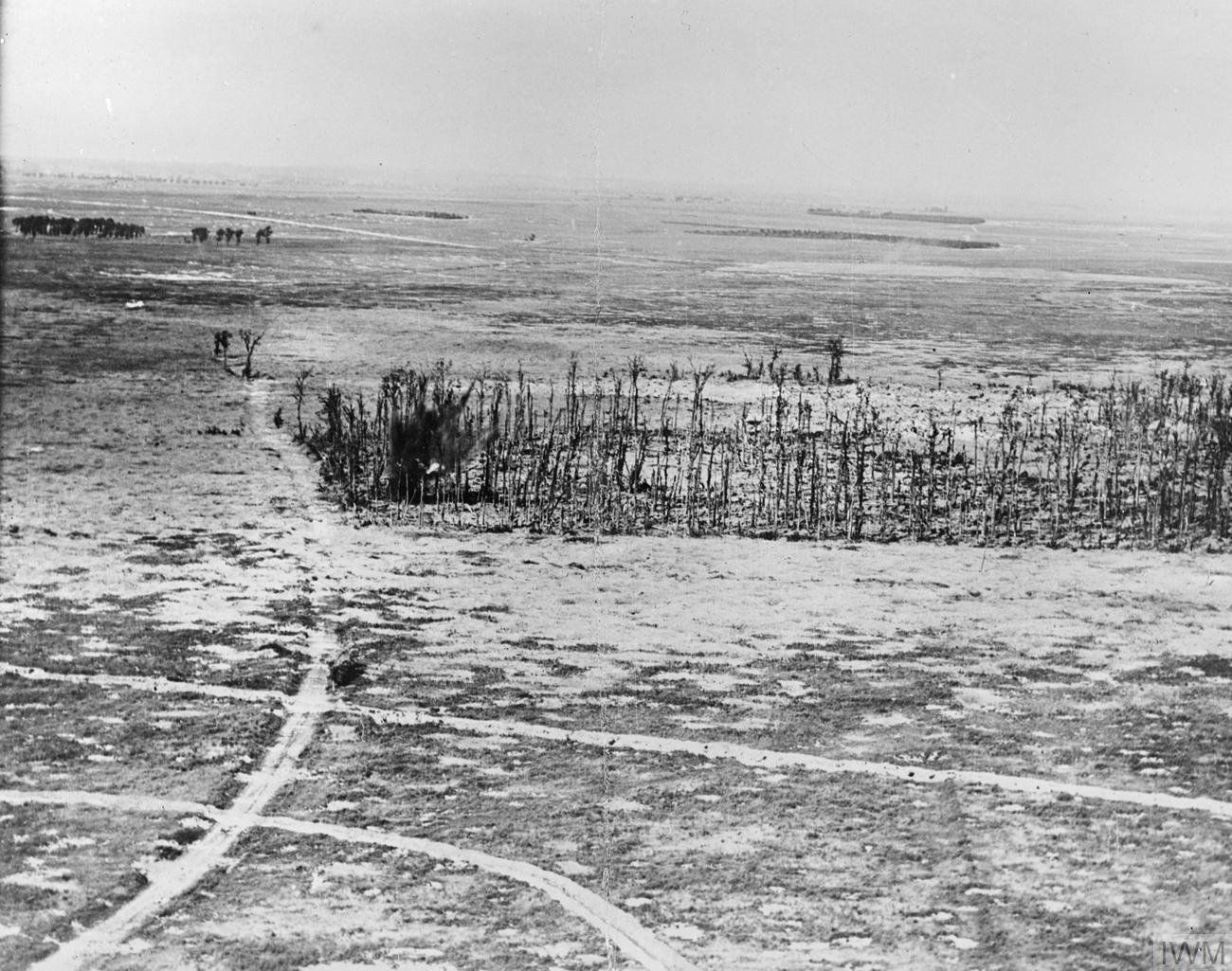
Oppy Wood from the air

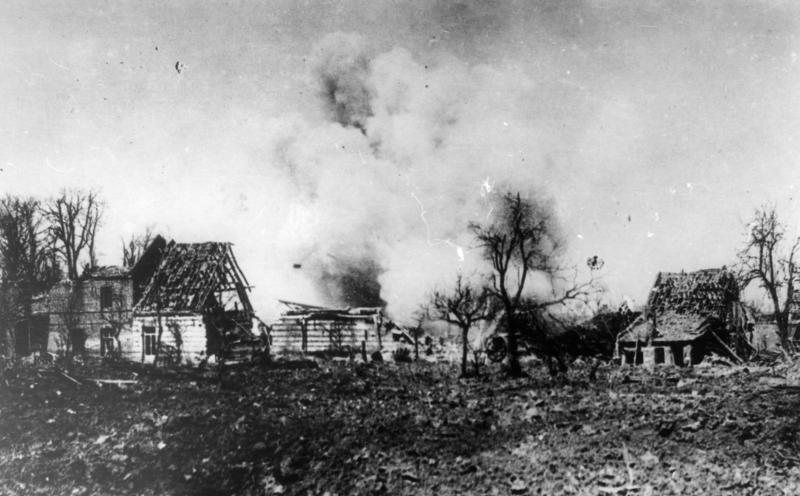
Oppy under shellfire, May 1917.

Casualties in 12th Bn had been so severe that it was temporarily reduced to two composite companies attached to the 10th and 11th Bns respectively. A fresh attack on Oppy Wood was arranged for 28 June. This time the attack was to be made by 94 Bde with 92 Bde in support. 10th Battalion was the brigade reserve, two companies of 11th Bn were to hold the front line, and 13th Bn was to provide carrying parties. Before the attack, each battalion of 92 Bde supplied a detachment for a trench raid to reconnoitre the objectives (Cadorna Trench, Wood Trench and Windmill Trench). 94 Brigade made its attack in the evening of 28 June and successfully took the trenches, completing the Capture of Oppy Wood.

31st Division was not committed to the Third Ypres Offensive, which culminated in the dreadful Battle of Passchendaele, possibly because it was not considered to have recovered from its ordeal on the Somme a year before.

When the BEF's brigades were reorganised on a three-battalion basis in February 1918, 12th Bn East Yorks was drafted to the 6th and 7th Bns (11th (Northern) Division and 17th (Northern) Division respectively), to 11th Bn in 92 Bde and the remainder to the 4th Entrenching Battalion. 13th Battalion was also drafted, the residue going to 4th Entrenching Bn. The two remaining Hull Pals battalions were joined in 92 Bde by the Accrington Pals (11th (Service) Bn East Lancashire Regiment) from the disbanded 94 Bde (which had absorbed the whole of 8th Bn East Lancs from 37th Division).

=== Ervillers and Ayette ===
When the German spring offensive opened on 21 March 1918, 31st Division was in reserve until it was sent up on 23 March; even then 92 Bde remained in reserve at Ervillers, improving the defences. Ervillers was attacked on the evening of 24 March, the defence being confused by British troops retreating from the forward defences. There was fighting in the village streets, but the next day the combined fire of 11th East Yorks and 10th Bn Manchester Regiment of 42nd (East Lancashire) Division stopped the German advance. However, events elsewhere meant that the 31st and 42nd Divisions were ordered to retire on the morning of 27 March.

The brigade defended Ayette aerodrome against repeated attacks from 11.20 to 16.30, when with both flanks 'in the air' it pulled back to the partly-dug 'Purple Line' in front of Ayette village. The last officer of 11th East Lancs to leave was 2nd Lt Basil Horsfall, who was killed during the retirement: he was awarded a posthumous VC. During the night, a composite battalion of troops from the quartermasters' details of all three battalions arrived to take over part of the Purple Line. Although fighting continued elsewhere along the line, 28 March was a quieter day for 92 Bde, which continued to dig. It was relieved on 31 March.

=== Hazebrouck ===
While resting in the Monchy-Breton area the brigade received large numbers of reinforcements, mainly under the age of 19. The bombardment for the second phase of the German offensive (the Battles of the Lys) opened on 7 April, and by 11 April the brigade had been called forward in ex-London buses to form a defensive line near Estaires through which retreating British and Portuguese troops could withdraw. Next day the Germans threw in all their reserves to try to take Hazebrouck. After both flanks were again left in the air, 10th and 11th Bns were forced to retire across watercourses and hedges, pursued by the enemy, until they reached a railway embankment at Méteren and a line at Merris held by the 11th East Lancs, the Royal Engineer companies, and two composite battalions formed by 92nd and 93rd Bdes. These consisted of details from the brigades with the TMB, a few machine guns from 21st and 31st MG Battalions, and stragglers from four different divisions. Fortunately it was a quiet night and reinforcements arrived from 1st Australian Division. When the attack was renewed on the morning of 13 April, these defenders caused heavy casualties among the attacking Germans. The brigade withdrew in early morning mist the following day through a new line held by fresh Australian and British troops, who defeated the attacks and ensured the safety of Hazebrouck.

By now 31st was one of the weakest divisions in the BEF. A temporary 92nd Composite Bn was formed from two companies from each of the battalions to assist the Australians. Then on 16 April 92nd and 93rd Bdes were temporarily amalgamated as '92nd Composite Bde' under the command of Brig-Gen O. de L. Williams of 92nd Bde:

- 92nd Composite Bn: 10th and 11th East Yorks
- 93rd Composite Bn: 15th/17th West Yorkshire Regiment and 18th Durham Light Infantry
- 94th Composite Bn: 11th East Lancashire Regiment and 13th York and Lancaster Regiment

Before the end of the month the brigade was again taking turns in the line with the Australians, carrying out a number of raids.

=== La Becque ===
On 24 May the brigade came out of the line and began training for offensive operations. 31st Division was scheduled for Operation Borderland, a limited attack on La Becque and other fortified farms in front of the Forest of Nieppe to be carried out on 28 June, chosen because it was the anniversary of the capture of Oppy. The barrage began at 06.00 and the brigade followed it closely with all three battalions in line, in what was described as 'a model operation' for artillery cooperation. Some casualties were suffered from British shells falling short, but the German resistance was slight and the final objectives were taken by 07.25. Several hundred prisoners were captured, together with field guns and mortars. The positions were consolidated under long range machine gun fire. German troops massing for a counter-attack were dispersed by artillery fire. The brigade was relieved on 30 June.

Successes like La Becque showed that the tide of war was turning. After a relatively quiet period in July, during which 92 Bde achieved small advances through aggressive patrolling and seizing strongpoints (so-called 'peaceful penetration'), the Allies began a coordinated offensive in August. 92 Brigade captured Vieux-Berquin on 13 August 1918 and pushed forward until running into serious opposition at the Warnave river south of Ploegsteert on 21 August. Fighting here round Soyer Farm continued until the brigade was relieved on 12 September.

=== Ploegsteert Wood ===
The brigade returned to the same trenches on 23 September, but the machine guns in Soyer Farm prevented any 'peaceful penetration'. A formal attack was arranged for the morning of 28 September (the opening day of the Fifth Battle of Ypres) but was postponed to 15.00 because of bad weather. The brigade advanced behind a creeping barrage and suffered heavy casualties, but the general retirement of the Germans along the whole line allowed it to push on through Ploegsteert Wood and advance up to the River Lys on 3 October.

=== Pursuit ===
Returning to the line on 12 October, patrols from the brigade slipped across the Lys on a raft during the night of 14/15 October and established posts on the far bank. The following afternoon further parties crossed and advanced under a barrage to the Deûlémont–Warneton road. The brigade continued the advance on 16 and 17 October, liberating several villages. By 18 October the battalions were advancing in company columns screened by XV Corps cyclist battalion, leap-frogging forward to liberate Tourcoing. Pressure was kept up through 19 and 20 October, until the brigade was squeezed out of the advancing line and went into support. Back in the line from 28 October, the brigade continued to advance slowly against machine gun and shell fire, from rearguards who 'did not appear disposed to give ground'. It served as divisional reserve for an attack at Tieghem on 31 October 1918 that was so successful the reserve was not required.

It returned to the line on the night of 6/7 November, crossing the Scheldt and sending forward 11th East Yorks as part of a pursuit force including a field artillery battery and companies from the divisional machine gun battalion, the Motor Machine Gun Corps and XIX Corps cyclists. When the Armistice with Germany came into force on 11 November, 11th East Lancs were leading the division, and scouts reported that there were no enemy in front.

== Disbandment ==
The division began to pull back on 13 November, and by the end of the month 92 Brigade was established in camp south of St-Omer and engaged in road repair. Demobilisation (chiefly of coal miners) began on 11 December and proceeded at a steadily increasing rate during January 1919. On 29 January the two East Yorks Battalions were sent by rail to Calais to deal with possible riots by men working in the Ordnance depot. Demobilisation accelerated in February and by April the battalions had been reduced to cadres, which left for England on 22 May.

No 92nd Brigade was formed during World War II.

== Commanders ==
The following officers commanded 92nd Brigade:

- Brigadier-General Sir Henry Dixon, appointed (to 113th Brigade) 31 December 1914
- Brigadier-General A. Parker, appointed 2 July 1915
- Brigadier-General O. de L. Williams, appointed 10 June 1916

== Insignia ==
92nd Brigade's Battle Patches

The first pattern of formation sign worn by 31st Division is shown above. In 1917 it adopted a new sign incorporating the Red Rose of Lancaster and the White Rose of York with green stems on a black background. In 92nd Bde, composed of East Yorkshire battalions, the white rose overlapped the red. The division also employed a system of 'battle patches' to identify brigades and units. In 1917 the sign for 92nd Bde was a horizontally bisected square white above red, worn by all ranks on the back, just below the collar. The infantry of 92nd and 93rd Bdes wore coloured bars at the top of both sleeves to indicate the seniority of their battalion. In 92nd Bde these were red and worn vertically, thereby equating to Roman numerals I–III for the 10th–12th East Yorkshires; naturally the 13th East Yorkshires wore 'IV'. 92nd MG Company wore a red cross; no recorded information has been found on the symbol worn by 92nd TMB.

== Notes ==
- Maj A.F. Becke,History of the Great War: Order of Battle of Divisions, Part 3a: New Army Divisions (9–26), London: HM Stationery Office, 1938/Uckfield: Naval & Military Press, 2007, ISBN 1-847347-41-X.
- Maj A.F. Becke,History of the Great War: Order of Battle of Divisions, Part 3b: New Army Divisions (30–41) and 63rd (R.N.) Division, London: HM Stationery Office, 1939/Uckfield: Naval & Military Press, 2007, ISBN 1-847347-41-X.
- David Bilton, Hull Pals, 10th, 11th 12th and 13th Battalions East Yorkshire Regiment – A History of 92 Infantry Brigade, 31st Division, Barnsley: Pen & Sword, 2014, ISBN 978-1-78346-185-1.
- David Bilton, Hull in the Great War 1914–1919, Barnsley: Pen & Sword, 2015, ISBN 978-1-47382-314-3.
- Gregory Blaxland, Amiens: 1918, London: Frederick Muller, 1968/Star, 1981, ISBN 0-352-30833-8.
- Rupert Drake, The Road to Lindi: Hull Boys in Africa: The 1st (Hull) Heavy Battery Royal Garrison Artillery in East Africa and France 1914–1919, Brighton: Reveille Press, 2013, ISBN 978-1-908336-56-9.
- Brig-Gen Sir James E. Edmonds, History of the Great War: Military Operations, France and Belgium, 1916, Vol I, London: Macmillan,1932/Woking: Shearer, 1986, ISBN 0-946998-02-7.
- Brig-Gen Sir James E. Edmonds, History of the Great War: Military Operations, France and Belgium 1918, Vol II, March–April: Continuation of the German Offensives, London: Macmillan, 1937/Imperial War Museum and Battery Press, 1995, ISBN 1-87042394-1/Uckfield: Naval & Military Press, 2009, ISBN 978-1-84574-726-8.
- Brig-Gen Sir James E. Edmonds & Lt-Col R. Maxwell-Hyslop, History of the Great War: Military Operations, France and Belgium 1918, Vol V, 26th September–11th November, The Advance to Victory, London: HM Stationery Office, 1947/Imperial War Museum and Battery Press, 1993, ISBN 1-870423-06-2.
- Clive Elderton & Gary Gibbs, World War One British Army Corps and Divisional Signs, Wokingham: Military History Society, 2018.
- Mike Hibberd, Infantry Divisions, Identification Schemes 1917, Wokingham: Military History Society, 2016.
- Jack Horsfall & Nigel Cave, Battleground Europe: Somme: Serre, London: Leo Cooper, 1996, ISBN 0-85052-508-X.
- Andrew Jackson, Accrington's Pals: The Full Story, Barnsley, Pen & Sword, 2013, ISBN 9781-84884-469-8.
- Brig E.A. James, British Regiments 1914–18, London: Samson Books, 1978, ISBN 0-906304-03-2/Uckfield: Naval & Military Press, 2001, ISBN 978-1-84342-197-9.
- Lt-Col H.F. Joslen, Orders of Battle, United Kingdom and Colonial Formations and Units in the Second World War, 1939–1945, London: HM Stationery Office, 1960/London: London Stamp Exchange, 1990, ISBN 0-948130-03-2/Uckfield: Naval & Military Press, 2003, ISBN 1-843424-74-6.
- Peter H. Liddle (ed), Passchendaele in Perspective: The Third Battle of Ypres, London: Leo Cooper, 1997, ISBN 0-85052-552-7.
- Martin Middlebrook, The First Day on the Somme, 1 July 1916, London: Allen Lane 1971/Fontana, 1975, ISBN 0-00-633626-4.
- Instructions Issued by The War Office During August, 1914, London: HM Stationery Office, 1916.
- Instructions Issued by The War Office During July, 1915, London: HM Stationery Office.
- Instructions Issued by The War Office During September, 1915, London: HM Stationery Office.

== External sources ==
- Chris Baker, The Long, Long Trail
