= 30th Division (United Kingdom) =

37th Division 30th Division
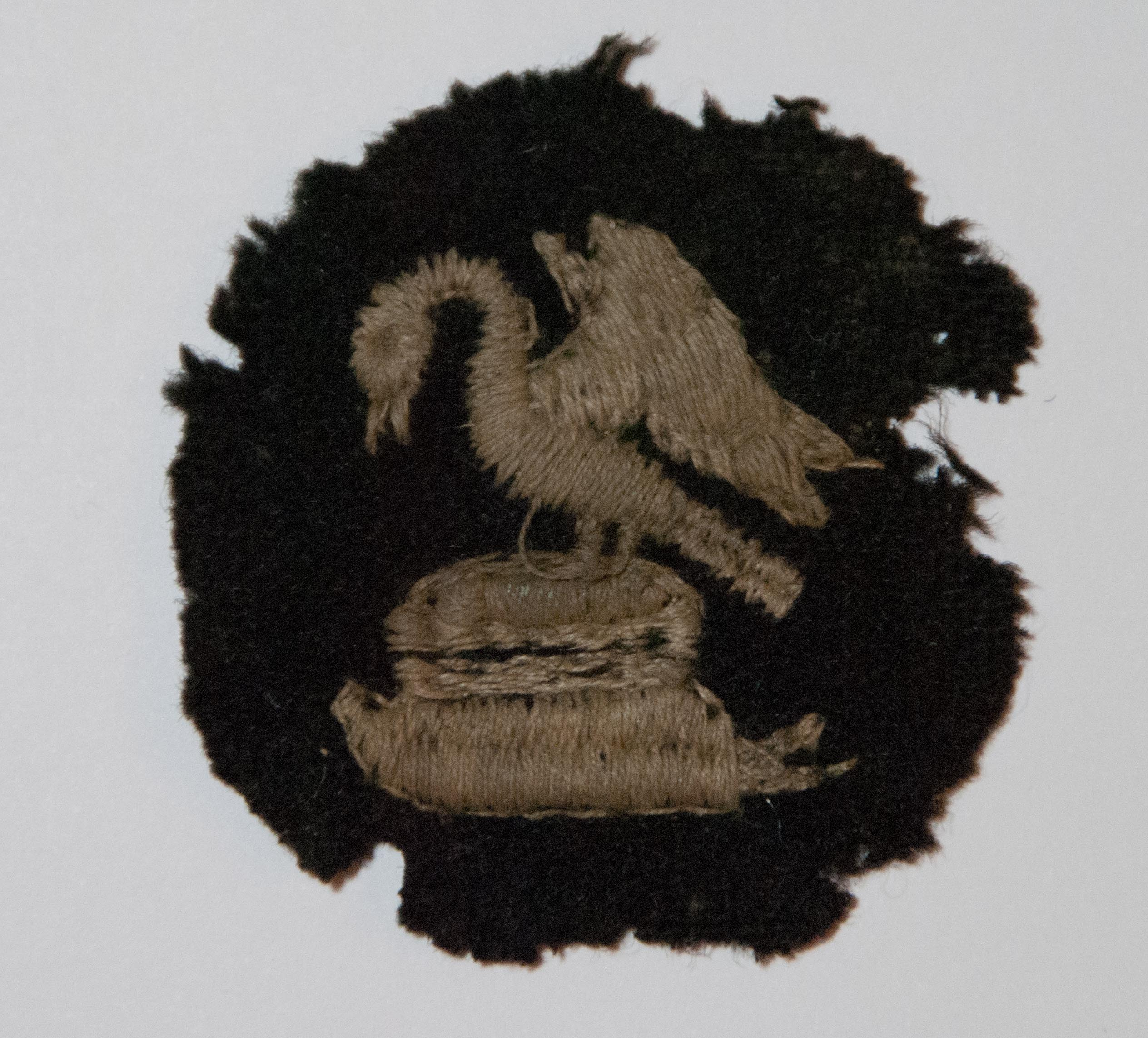
- The divisional insignia used by the division from July 1918 onwards. It depicts the personal crest of Edward Stanley, 17th Earl of Derby.
- Active: 1915 – September 1919
- Country: United Kingdom
- Branch: British Army
- Type: Infantry
- Engagements: First World War Battle of the Somme (1916) Battle of Albert (1916)

The British 30th Division was a New Army division that was originally made up of battalions raised by public subscription or private patronage. The division was taken over by the British War Office in August 1915 and moved to France in December. It served on the Western Front for the duration of the First World War.

== Formation ==
On 28 July 1914, the First World War started. Seven days later, on 4 August, Germany invaded Belgium and the United Kingdom entered the war to uphold the Treaty of London (1839). Britain faced a continental war it was not prepared to fight, and while the Expeditionary Force was dispatched to France and Belgium, the country lacked the forces required for the protracted war envisioned by the military leadership. (Note: The Expeditionary Force was prefaced with British when the Indian Expeditionary Force arrived in France.)

On 5 August, Herbert Kitchener was appointed Secretary of State for War. This position allowed Kitchener a largely independent role within the war cabinet. His first act, the next day, was to request parliamentary approval to increase the strength of the British Army by 500,000 men. Over the following days, the Army Council laid out plans for Kitchener's proposed expansion: traditional recruitment would be used to expand the regular army, bypassing the county associations and thus avoiding expanding the Territorial Force. The first wave, originally termed the New Expeditionary Force, became the First New Army. Historian Peter Simkins wrote that Kitchener held the Territorial Force in disdain, calling it an ill-trained "Town Clerk's Army", and this was partially why he set up a parallel recruitment system. Simkins noted that it would be a "gross oversimplification to ascribe Kitchener's decision merely to prejudice and ignorance". Had the Territorial Force been used as the basis for expansion it would have been "swamped" and "rendered temporarily incapable of carrying out any function at all", when a "viable home defence force" was needed due to the threat of a German invasion.

On 10 December 1914, the formation of the Fifth New Army was authorized and consisted of the 37th Division with the 110th, the 111th, and the 112th brigades. Edward Stanley, 17th Earl of Derby was instrumental in raising pals battalions for the King's Regiment (Liverpool) and the Manchester Regiment, which formed the basis of these newly formed brigades and the division. In April 1915, the Fourth New Army was broken-up to provide reinforcements for other new army divisions. This resulted in a series of number and name changes, with the Fifth New Army becoming the Fourth; the 37th Division was renumbered as the 30th Division; and the 110th and 111th Brigades became the 89th and 90th Brigades. The 112th Brigade was transferred to the 35th Division, and was exchanged with the 126th Brigade that was renumbered as the 91st when it joined the 30th.

The division started to assemble, as a single formation, in April 1915 near Grantham and the first general officer commanding (Major-General William Fry) was appointed on 4 May 1915. The final elements of the division did not join until August, owing to equipment shortages. On 14 September, the division departed Lincolnshire for Larkhill in the Salisbury Plain Training Area to undergo final training before being deployed to France. This lasted until 31 October, when the order for deployment was received. While advance parties left for France the next day, the rest of the formation was reviewed on 4 November by Edward Stanley. Two days later, a move to Southampton and Folkestone took place. Troops sent to the former were transported to Le Havre, while those sent to the later were dispatched to France via Boulogne. By 12 November, the division had finished its move and was located at Ailly-le-Haut-Clocher, northwest of Amiens. While some sort of insignia was displayed on the helmet and worn on the uniform sleeves once deployed, little is known of what they consisted of.

== Service during the First World War ==
During 1916, the division fought in the Battle of the Somme, specifically: the Battle of Albert (including the First day on the Somme and the capture of Montauban), the Capture of Trônes Wood, and the Battle of Le Transloy. In 1917, it took part in the First and the Second battles of the Scarpe, which formed part of the larger Battle of Arras; this was followed by the Battle of Pilckem Ridge later in the year. The final year of the war saw the division engaged in the 1918 First Battle of the Somme, including the Battle of St. Quentin, actions at the crossing of the Somme, and the Battle of Rosieres. This was followed by the Battle of the Lys. Following these battles, the remnants of the infantry were withdrawn rendering the formation a division in name only. In July, it was reconstituted as a fighting formation. Around this time, a variation of the crest of the Stanley family–an eagle standing above a swaddled infant–was adopted as the divisional insignia. The formation then went on to take part in the culminating offensive of the war, the Hundred Days Offensive. The division's total losses during the war amounted to 35,182 killed, wounded, or reported as missing.

Following the armistice of 11 November 1918, the division moved back away from the frontline area until it reached the vicinity of Blaringhem, with the HQ based at Renescure, on 4 December. Towards the end of the month, the formation was tasked with supporting efforts at the army's supply ports at Dunkirk, Calais, Boulogne, and Étaples and relocated to them in January. By the middle of the following month, it was only supporting the ports at Boulogne and Étaples. Meanwhile, demobilization had started although the division's first troops did not return to the UK until May and the process had finished by 1 September when the division ceased to exist.

== Order of Battle ==
The following units served with the division:

21st Brigade

The brigade joined from the 7th Division in December 1915, swapping with the 91st Brigade.

- 2nd Battalion, Bedfordshire Regiment (transferred to 89th Brigade 20 December 1915)
- 2nd Battalion, Alexandra, Princess of Wales's Own (Yorkshire Regiment) (left May 1918)
- 2nd Battalion, Royal Scots Fusiliers (transferred to 90th Brigade 20 December 1915)
- 2nd Battalion, The Duke of Edinburgh's (Wiltshire Regiment) (left May 1918)
- 18th (Service) Battalion, King's Regiment (Liverpool) (joined from 89th Brigade 20 December 1915, rejoined 89th Brigade February 1918)
- 19th (Service) Battalion, Manchester Regiment (4th City) (joined from 90th Brigade 20 December 1915 disbanded February 1918)
- 17th (Service) Battalion, Manchester Regiment (2nd City) (joined February 1918, left as cadre June 1918)
- 2/5th (Service) Battalion, Lincolnshire Regiment (joined May 1918, left June 1918)
- 21st Machine Gun Company (joined 8 March 1916, moved to 30th Battalion Machine Gun Corps (M.G.C.) 1 March 1918)
- 21st Trench Mortar Battery formed by 5 July 1916

On reorganisation in July 1918:

- 7th (South Irish Horse) Battalion, The Royal Irish Regiment
- 1/6th Battalion, Cheshire Regiment
- 2/23rd (County of London) Battalion, London Regiment
- 21st Trench Mortar Battery

89th Brigade

- 17th (Service) Battalion, King's Regiment (Liverpool) (left June 1918)
- 18th (Service) Battalion, King's Regiment (Liverpool) (transferred to 21st Brigade December 1915, returned from 21st Brigade February 1918, left June 1918)
- 19th (Service) Battalion, King's Regiment (Liverpool) (reduced to cadre left 19 June 1918)
- 20th (Service) Battalion, King's Regiment (Liverpool) (disbanded February 1918)
- 2nd Battalion, Bedfordshire Regiment (joined from 21st Brigade 20 December 1915, transferred to 90th Brigade February 1918)
- 89th Machine Gun Company (joined 13 March 1916, moved to 30th Battalion M.G.C. 1 March 1918)
- 89th Trench Mortar Battery (joined by 16 June 1916)

On reorganisation in July 1918:

- 2nd Battalion, South Lancashire Regiment
- 7/8th (Service) Battalion, Royal Inniskilling Fusiliers
- 2/17th (County of London) Battalion, London Regiment
- 89th Trench Mortar Battery

90th Brigade

- 16th (Service) Battalion, Manchester Regiment (1st City) (left June 1918)
- 17th (Service) Battalion, Manchester Regiment (2nd City) (left February 1918)
- 18th (Service) Battalion, Manchester Regiment (3rd City) (disbanded February 1918)
- 19th (Service) Battalion, Manchester Regiment (4th City) (left December 1915)
- 2nd Battalion, Royal Scots Fusiliers (joined December 1915 left April 1918)
- 2nd Battalion, Bedfordshire Regiment (joined from 89th Brigade February 1918 left May 1918)
- 14th (Service) Battalion, Argyll & Sutherland Highlanders (joined April 1918, left June 1918)
- 90th Machine Gun Company (joined 13 March 1916, moved to 30th Battalion M.G.C. 1 March 1918)
- 90th Trench Mortar Battery (formed by 16 June 1916)

On reorganisation in July 1918:

- 2/14th (County of London) Battalion, London Regiment
- 2/15th (County of London) Battalion, London Regiment
- 2/16th (County of London) Battalion, London Regiment
- 90th Trench Mortar Battery

91st Brigade

The brigade formed in April 1915 and moved to the 7th Division in December of that year, swapping with the 21st Brigade.

- 20th (Service) Battalion, Manchester Regiment (5th City)
- 21st (Service) Battalion, Manchester Regiment (6th City)
- 22nd (Service) Battalion, Manchester Regiment (7th City)
- 24th (Service) Battalion, Manchester Regiment (Oldham)

Divisional Troops

- 11th (Service) Battalion, South Lancashire Regiment (joined as Divisional Pioneer Battalion May 1915, left as cadre June 1918)
- 6th (Service) Battalion, South Wales Borderers (joined as Divisional Pioneer Battalion July 1918)
- 226th Machine Gun Company (joined 19 July 1917, moved to 30th Battalion M.G.C. 1 March 1918)
- 19th Motor Machine Gun Battery (joined 10 February 1916, left 6 June 1916)
- 30th Battalion M.G.C. (formed 1 March 1918, reduced to cadre 13 May 1918 replaced on 29 June 1918 by a redesignated “A” Bn, MGC)
- Divisional Mounted Troops
  - D Sqn, Lancashire Hussars (left 10 May 1916)
  - 30th Divisional Cyclist Company, Army Cyclist Corps (left 21 May 1916)
- 30th Divisional Train Army Service Corps
  - 186th, 187th, 188th and 189th Companies (joined from 22nd Division in France in November 1915)
- 40th Mobile Veterinary Section Army Veterinary Corps
- 227th Divisional Employment Company (joined 24 May 1917)

Royal Artillery

- CXLVIII Brigade, Royal Field Artillery (R.F.A.)
- CXLIX Brigade, R.F.A.
- CL Brigade, R.F.A. (left 2 January 1917)
- CLI (Howitzer) Brigade, R.F.A. (broken up 26 August 1916)
- 11th (Hull) Heavy Battery, Royal Garrison Artillery (R.G.A.) (joined June 1915, left March 1916)
- 125th Heavy Battery, R.G.A. (raised with the Division but moved independently to France on 29 April 1916)
- 30th Divisional Ammunition Column R.F.A.
- V.30 Heavy Trench Mortar Battery, R.F.A. (joined by 7 October 1916, left by 11 February 1918)
- X.30, Y.30 and Z.30 Medium Mortar Batteries, R.F.A.(joined April 1916, 11 February 1918, Z broken up and batteries distributed among X and Y batteries)

Royal Engineers

- 200th (County Palatine) Field Company
- 201st (County Palatine) Field Company
- 202nd (County Palatine) Field Company
- 30th Divisional Signals Company

Royal Army Medical Corps

- 111th Field Ambulance (left September 1915)
- 112th Field Ambulance (left September 1915)
- 113th Field Ambulance (left September 1915)
- 70th Sanitary Section (left 2 April 1917)
- 96th Field Ambulance(joined November 1915)
- 97th Field Ambulance (joined November 1915)
- 98th Field Ambulance (joined November 1915)

== General officers commanding ==
The division had the following commanders during the First World War:

Appointed	General officer commanding
4 May 1915	Major-General William Fry
13 May 1916	Brigadier-General Charles Sackville-West (acting)
17 May 1916	Major-General John Stuart Mackenzie Shea
30 April 1917	Major-General Weir De Lancey Williams
Post-armistice	Major-General Neill Malcolm
April 1919	Unknown

== See also ==
- List of British divisions in World War I

== Notes ==
Footnotes

Citations
