= 108th Brigade (United Kingdom) =

Military unit

The 108th Brigade was a formation of the British Army during the First World War. It was raised as part of the new army also known as Kitchener's Army and assigned to the 36th (Ulster) Division. The brigade served on the Western Front.

== Formation ==
The infantry battalions did not all serve at once, but all were assigned to the brigade during the war.

- 11th Battalion, Royal Irish Rifles (South Antrim)
- 12th Battalion, Royal Irish Rifles (Central Antrim)
- 13th Battalion, Royal Irish Rifles (County Down)
- 9th Battalion, Royal Irish Fusiliers (County Armagh)
- 108th Machine Gun Company
- 108th Trench Mortar Battery
- 7th Battalion, Royal Irish Rifles
- 2nd Battalion, Royal Irish Rifles
- 1st Battalion, Royal Irish Fusiliers
