= 104th Brigade (United Kingdom) =

Military unit

The 104th Brigade was a formation of the British Army during the First World War. It was raised as part of the new army, also known as Kitchener's Army, and assigned to the 35th Division. The brigade served on the Western Front.

The infantry was originally composed of Bantams, the name given to soldiers who would otherwise be excluded from service due to their short stature. This became a regular infantry Brigade with the end of the Bantam experiment at the end of 1916, after it was noted that bantam replacements were not up to the physical standards of the original recruits.

The brigade was disbanded in April 1919 at Ripon; the brigade was not reformed in the Second World War.

== Order of battle ==
The composition of the brigade was as follows:

- 17th (Service) Battalion, Lancashire Fusiliers (1st South-East Lancashire)
- 18th (Service) Battalion, Lancashire Fusiliers (2nd South-East Lancashire)
- 20th (Service) Battalion, Lancashire Fusiliers (4th Salford) (disbanded February 1918)
- 23rd (Service) Battalion, Manchester Regiment (8th City) (disbanded February 1918)
- 19th (Service) Battalion, Durham Light Infantry (2nd County) (joined February 1918 from 106th Brigade)
- 104th Machine Gun Company Machine Gun Corps (joined April 1916, left for division MG battalion February 1918)
- 104th Trench Mortar Battery (joined February 1916)

== Commanders ==
- Brig-Gen G M Mackenzie to 14 April 1916
- Brig-Gen J W Sandilands C.M.G., D.S.O. from 14 April 1916 to March 1919
