= 116th Brigade (United Kingdom) =

121st Brigade 116th Brigade
- Active: 10 December 1914–27 April 1915 (as 121st Bde); 27 April 1915–10 July 1919 (as 116th Bde)
- Country: United Kingdom
- Branch: New Army
- Type: Infantry
- Size: 3–4 Battalions
- Part of: 39th Division
- Engagements: Battle of the Somme; Battle of the Ancre; Third Battle of Ypres; German spring offensive

The 116th Brigade was an infantry formation of the British Army during World War I. Originally raised in December 1914 from locally raised volunteer units of 'Kitchener's Army' known as 'Pals battalions', it was later redesignated and the number was transferred to a different 'Pals' brigade. It fought with 39th Division on the Somme and the Ancre, at Ypres and in the German spring offensive. After the appalling casualties in that campaign it was relegated to a training organisation preparing US Army units for active service. It was disbanded in 1919.

== Original 116th Brigade ==
Alfred Leete's recruitment poster for Kitchener's Army.

On 6 August 1914, less than 48 hours after Britain's declaration of war, Parliament sanctioned an increase of 500,000 men for the Regular British Army. The newly appointed Secretary of State for War, Earl Kitchener of Khartoum, issued his famous call to arms: 'Your King and Country Need You', urging the first 100,000 volunteers to come forward. This group of six divisions with supporting arms became known as Kitchener's First New Army, or 'K1'. The K2, K3 and K4 battalions, brigades and divisions followed soon afterwards. But the flood of volunteers overwhelmed the ability of the Army to absorb them, and the K5 units were largely raised by local initiative rather than at regimental depots, often from men from particular localities or backgrounds who wished to serve together: these were known as 'Pals battalions'. The 'Pals' phenomenon quickly spread across the country, as local recruiting committees offered complete units to the War Office (WO). On 10 December 1914 the WO authorised the formation of another six divisions (37th–42nd) and their brigades to command these K5 units, including 116th Brigade in 39th Division and 121st Brigade in 40th Division. The original 116th Bde was to comprise three battalions of the Birmingham Pals and one pals battalion from Bristol:

- 14th (Service) Battalion, Royal Warwickshire Regiment (1st Birmingham)
- 15th (Service) Battalion, Royal Warwickshire Regiment (2nd Birmingham)
- 16th (Service) Battalion, Royal Warwickshire Regiment (3rd Birmingham)
- 12th (Service) Battalion, Gloucestershire Regiment (Bristol's Own)

== New 116th Brigade ==
39th Division's insignia.

However, on 10 April 1915 the WO decided to convert the K4 battalions into reserve units. The K4 divisions and brigades were broken up and the K5 formations took over their numbers, so that 116th Brigade in 39th Division became 95th Bde in 32nd Division. Authorisation for three new infantry brigades – 116th, 117th and 118th – to constitute a new 39th Division was issued on 12 July 1915, but while 117th and 118th were newly-formed, 116th Brigade was created by renumbering 121st Bde.

The new 39th Division began to assemble around Winchester early in August 1915, but it was only after it had moved to Aldershot at the end of September that 116th Bde Headquarters (HQ) joined and its Pals battalions began arriving: first the 'South Downs' battalions, then the 'Portsmouth' battalion in October. Early in November the division moved to Witley Camp in Surrey, where it completed its training. Mobilisation orders were received during February 1916 and after some delays entrainment for Southampton Docks began on 2 March. The division embarked and sailed to Le Havre, and by 8 March had completed its landing. It then moved to the divisional concentration area at Blaringhem in First Army's area.

=== Order of Battle ===
116th Brigade was constituted as follows:

- 11th (Service) Battalion, Royal Sussex Regiment (1st South Down)
- 12th (Service) Battalion, Royal Sussex Regiment (2nd South Down) – disbanded 8 February 1918
- 13th (Service) Battalion, Royal Sussex Regiment (3rd South Down)
- 14th (Service) Battalion, Hampshire Regiment (1st Portsmouth) – disbanded 23 February 1918
- 116th Brigade Machine Gun Company, Machine Gun Corps – formed at Grantham 1 March 1916, disembarked at Le Havre 16 May and joined brigade 18 May 1916; transferred to 39th Divisional MG Battalion by 14 March 1918
- 116th Trench Mortar Battery – formed within the brigade as 116/1 and 116/2 on 9 April 1916, became 116th TM Bty by 16 June; personnel seconded from the infantry battalions; equipped with 3-inch Stokes mortars
- 1/1st Hertfordshire Regiment – Territorial Force (TF) battalion transferred from 118th Bde 8 February 1918

=== Service ===
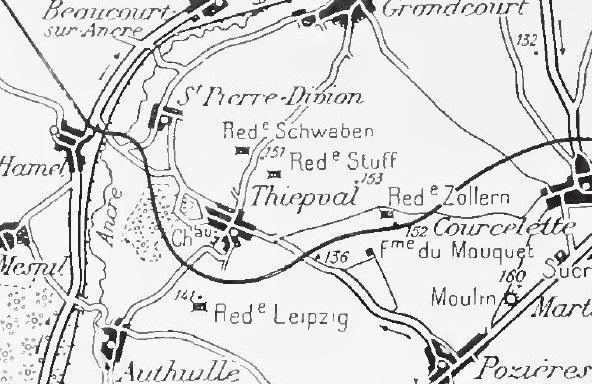
The Ancre battlefield, including Thiepval and the Stuff Redoubt.

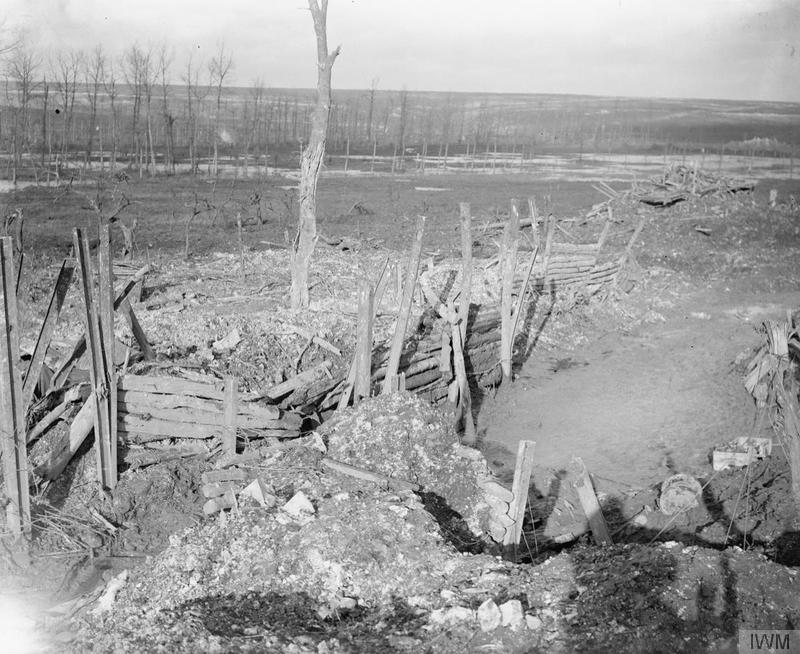
German trench at St Pierre-Divion with the Ancre in the background, after the fighting in November 1916.

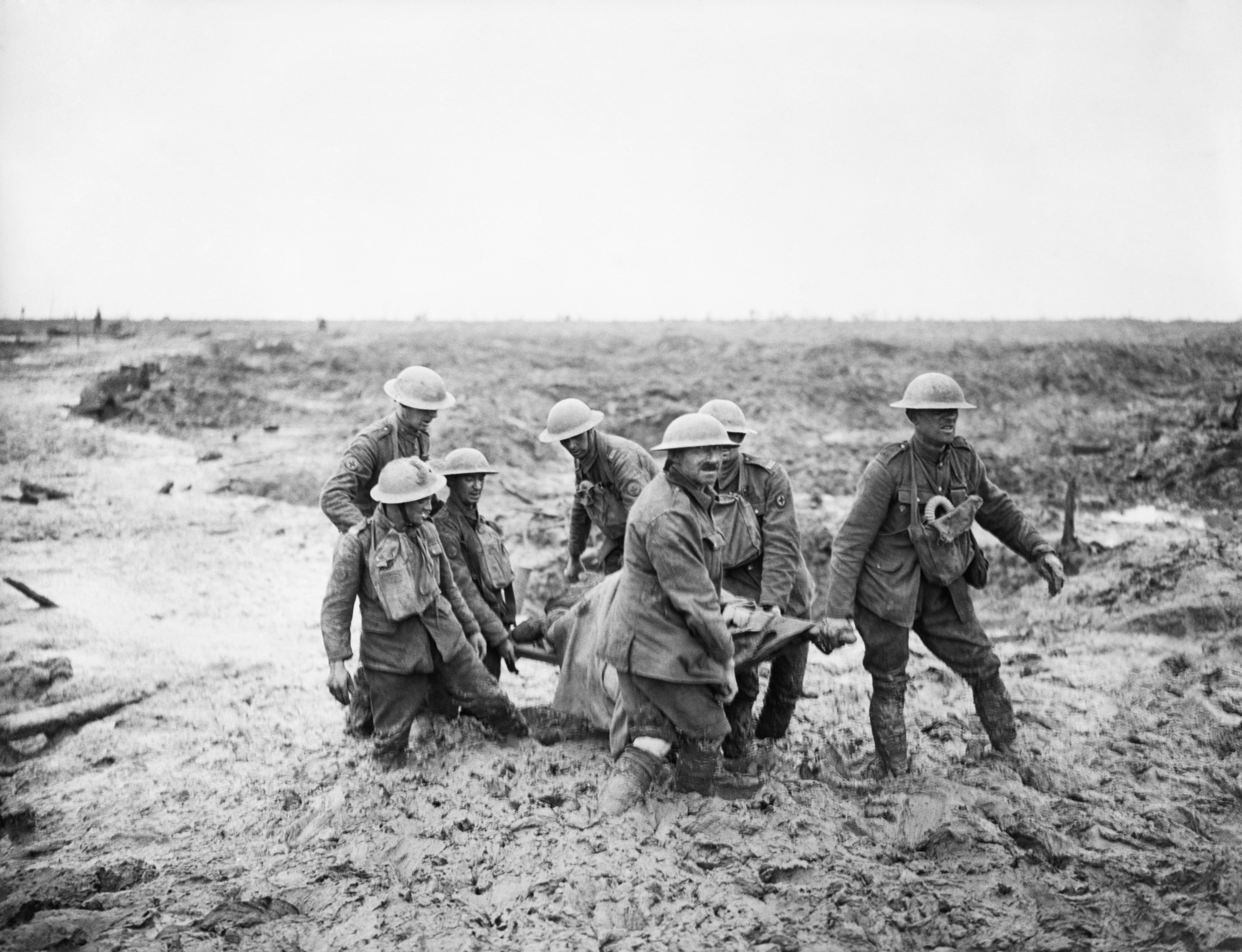
A team of stretcher-bearers struggling to evacuate a wounded man after the Battle of Pilckem Ridge.

The brigade took part in the following actions:

1916

- Battle of the Somme:
  - Fighting on the Ancre 3 September: 116th Bde secured the German front trench on the spur above the river, and some of the Sussex reached their final objective, but other formations failed to advance up the valley and 116th Bde was driven out of its gains
  - Battle of Thiepval Ridge 26–28 September
  - Battle of the Ancre Heights 5 October–11 November
    - Capture of Stuff Trench 21 October: this was achieved by 116th Bde
  - Battle of the Ancre 13–14 November: 116th Bde provided listening posts before the attack and 116th Bde MG Company supported the assault by the rest of 39th Division

1917

- Third Battle of Ypres:
  - Battle of Pilckem Ridge 31 July–2 August: 116th Bde successfully occupied St Julien
  - Battle of Langemarck 16–18 August
  - Battle of the Menin Road Ridge 20–25 September: in divisional reserve
  - Battle of Polygon Wood 26 September: 116th Bde succeeded in capturing the group of dugouts and machine gun nests known as 'Tower Hamlets' on the spur above the Bassevillebeek stream, which had resisted since 31 July
  - Second Battle of Passchendaele 29 October–10 November

1918

- German spring offensive: When the offensive began on 21 March 39th Division was in GHQ Reserve. During the day 116th Bde was sent up to reinforce VII Corps and was temporarily placed under the command of 16th (Irish) Division.
  - Battle of St Quentin 22–23 March: During 16th (I) Division's withdrawal 116th Bde was heavily engaged as a rearguard, in which 13th Royal Sussex was surrounded and much of it overrun; 116th Bde reverted to 39th Division during the night of 22/23 March, and next day it formed the rearguard for 39th Division, Brig-Gen Hornby being wounded by a shell.
  - Battle of Bapaume 24–25 March: 116th Bde was temporarily attached to 21st Division, and once again it acted as rearguard on 24 March, succeeding in disengaging next day and going into divisional reserve.
  - Battle of Rosières 26–27 March: 39th Division continued withdrawing on 26 March, the brigades 'leapfrogging' each other until 116th Bde went back into divisional reserve at nightfall; 39th Division then made small-scale counter-attacks, with 116th Bde forming a composite battalion, until relieved on 30/31 March.

Each brigade was now hardly stronger than a single battalion, and the infantry of 39th Division was reorganised as '39th Composite Brigade'. No 1 Battalion was formed from 11th Sussex and 1/1st Herts with the 1st Line transport of 1/1st Herts; 13th Sussex and its 1st Line transport joined No 2 Battalion, and the remainder of 116th Bde formed C Company of No 5 Battalion. The composite brigade then fought in the following actions with XXII Corps:

- Battle of the Lys:
  - Fighting on Wytschaete Ridge 16 April
  - First Battle of Kemmel Ridge 17–19 April)
  - Second Battle of Kemmel Ridge 25–26 April: formed a defensive flank; No 2 Bn shelled but not seriously attacked
  - Battle of the Scherpenberg 29 April: in corps reserve

=== Reorganisation ===
While the composite brigade was still in action, 39th Divisional HQ had moved to Éperlecques, north-west of Saint-Omer. No 5 Battalion returned to the division on 30 April and its components returned to their brigades; the rest of 39th Composite Bde was broken up and rejoined the division on 6 May. Following their crippling losses during the German spring offensive, the infantry brigades of 39th Division were withdrawn from active service. Their battalions were reduced to training cadres (TCs) and the TMBs broken up, the surplus personnel being drafted as reinforcements to other units. All three of 116th Bde's TCs left by the end of June to be reconstituted or disbanded, and it became a holding formation for a number of TCs from other divisions:

- 6th (Service) Battalion, Bedfordshire Regiment – from 112th Bde, 37th Division, 22 May; to 118th Bde 31 May (used to reconstitute 1/1st Herts)
- 7th (Service) Battalion, Suffolk Regiment – from 35th Bde, 12th (Eastern) Division, 24 May; to 66th (2nd East Lancashire) Division 16 August
- 15th (Service) Battalion, Royal Scots – from 101st Bde, 34th Division, 17 June; to XV Corps' Reinforcement Camp 28 July
- 16th (Service) Battalion, Royal Scots – from 101st Bde, 34th Division, 17 June; disbanded 14 August
- 18th (Service) Battalion, Northumberland Fusiliers – from Pioneer battalion, 34th Division, 17 June; to 118th Bde 29 July
- 23rd (Service) Battalion, Northumberland Fusiliers – from 102nd (Tyneside Scottish) Bde, 34th Division, 17 June; to 66th (2nd EL) Division 16 August
- 10th (Service) Battalion, Lincolnshire Regiment (Grimsby Chums) – from 103rd Bde, 34th Division, 17 June; to 66th (2nd EL) Division 16 August
- 5th Battalion, North Staffordshire Regiment (TF) – from 117th Bde 12 August; demobilised 6 November 1918
- 4th Battalion, Green Howards (TF) – from 150th (York and Durham) Bde, 50th (Northumbrian) Division, 16 August; demobilised 9 November 1918
- 5th Battalion, Green Howards (TF) – from 150th (Y&D) Bde, 50th (N) Division, 16 August; demobilised 6 November 1918
- 4th (Extra Reserve) Battalion, South Staffordshire Regiment (Special Reserve) – from 7th Bde, 25th Division, 12 August; demobilised 6 November 1918
- 4th Battalion, Lincolnshire Regiment (TF) – from 177th Bde 59th (2nd NM) Division, 28 September; demobilised 8 November 1918
- 4th Battalion, East Lancashire Regiment (TF) – from 118th Bde 16 November; demobilised
- 7th Battalion, Sherwood Foresters (TF) – from 39th Division HQ 16 November; demobilised

The 77th US Division had arrived at Éperlecques, and it began training under the guidance of the 39th Division TCs on 7 May. On 7 June 39th Divisional HQ moved to Wolphus, also near Saint-Omer, and over the next two months its TCs trained the 30th, 78th and 80th US Divisions in turn. In mid-August 39th Division moved to the French coast with 116th Bde at Étaples. On 1 November the division. was ordered to demobilise its remaining TCs, and 116th Bde completed this for its TF and SR battalions before hostilities with the Armistice with Germany on 11 November. 117th and 118th Bdes were disbanded shortly afterwards, but in December 116th Bde HQ went to Le Havre to form the staff of the embarkation camp, processing demobilised soldiers returning to the UK. 39th Divisional HQ and its remaining subordinate units closed down on 10 July 1919.

== Commanders ==
The following officers commanded the brigade:

- Brig-Gen J.E. Watson, appointed to 121st Bde 1 April 1915
- Brig-Gen M.L. Hornby, appointed 13 April 1916, wounded 23 March 1918
- Lt-Col W.C. Millward, acting 18–22 and 23–31 March 1918
- Brig-Gen L.J. Wyatt, appointed 1 April 1918
- Lt-Col D.J. Ward, acting 4 November 1918
- Lt-Col R.G. Hely-Hutchinson, acting 18 December 1918

== Insignia ==
39th Division's formation badge was a white square with three light blue vertical stripes. This was worn on the upper arm. Within 116th Bde, the South Down battalions of the Royal Sussex wore a blue rectangle with one, two or three vertical stripes of orange (the traditional colour of the regimental facings) to denote 1st, 2nd or 3rd Bn. Originally this was worn as a vertical rectangle on the back, just below the collar; in the summer of 1917 the battalions were ordered to move the badge to the shoulder, so they cut them in half to form horizontal rectangles. The 14th Hants wore a triangle bisected vertically in yellow and black.

== World War II ==
A new 116th Infantry Brigade Royal Marines was formed in the UK on 4 January 1945, with three Royal Marines battalions under command, and sent to reinforce 21st Army Group during the last stages of the war in North West Europe.
