= Bravo, Bristol! =

Bravo, Bristol! is a song with lyrics by Fred Weatherly set to music by Ivor Novello. It was originally written in 1914 to celebrate the 12th Battalion (Bristol's Own), Gloucestershire Regiment going to fight in the First World War, but fell into obscurity after the war. A copy of the sheet music was later discovered in the Bristol Record Office. Bristol singer Paul Potts recorded the song with a local choir for the BBC's Inside Out West in 2011.
