= 32nd Divisional Artillery =

- Royal Artillery cap badge
- Active: 1915–19
- Country: United Kingdom
- Branch: Kitchener's Army
- Role: Field artillery
- Size: 2–4 Artillery brigades
- Part of: 32nd Division
- Patron: West Yorkshire Coal Owners' Association; Major Ernest Meysey-Thompson, MP; Charles Wilson, 2nd Baron Nunburnholme
- Engagements: Battle of the Somme; Battle of the Ancre; Operation Alberich; Battle of Messines; Defence of Nieuport; German spring offensive Hundred Days Offensive

Commanders
- Notable commanders: Brig-Gen J.A. Tyler

The 32nd Divisional Artillery (32nd DA) was a Royal Artillery force (Note: The artillery component of a British infantry division during World War I was commanded by a brigadier-general and was effectively a brigade, but was never referred to as such because 'brigade' was the term used by the Royal Artillery to designate a battalion-sized unit comprising a number of batteries.) raised as part of 'Kitchener's Army' in early 1915. Recruited in Yorkshire, originally for the 31st Division, the units served with the 'Pals battalions' of the 32nd Division on the Western Front for three years. They saw action at the Somme, the pursuit to the Hindenburg Line, the German spring offensive, and the Allied Hundred Days Offensive.

== Background ==
On 6 August 1914, less than 48 hours after Britain's declaration of war, Parliament sanctioned an increase of 500,000 men for the Regular British Army, and the newly appointed Secretary of State for War, Earl Kitchener of Khartoum issued his famous call to arms: 'Your King and Country Need You', urging the first 100,000 volunteers to come forward. This group of six divisions with supporting arms became known as Kitchener's First New Army, or 'K1'. The flood of volunteers overwhelmed the ability of the army to absorb and organise them, and by the time the Fifth New Army (K5) was authorised on 10 December 1914, many of the units were being organised as 'local units' or 'Pals battalions' under the auspices of mayors and recruiting committees at towns up and down the country.

== Recruitment ==
The six K5 divisions were to be numbered 37th to 42nd, and the 38th Division was formed from Pals battalions raised in the North of England such as the Accrington Pals, the Sheffield City Battalion, and a whole brigade of Hull Pals. The first artillery unit assigned to the division was the CLV (West Yorkshire) Brigade (155th Bde) of the Royal Field Artillery (RFA), raised by the Leeds-based West Yorkshire Coal Owners' Association for which authority was given by the War Office (WO) on 1 February 1915. Shortly afterwards the other RFA brigades for this division were raised from Yorkshire towns by Major Ernest Meysey-Thompson, MP:

- CLXI (or 161st) (Yorkshire) Brigade, RFA, authorised 10 March 1915, recruited from York, Scarborough and Wakefield
- CLXIV (or 164th) (Rotherham) Howitzer Brigade, RFA, authorised 9 April 1915
- CLXVIII (or 168th) (Huddersfield) Brigade, RFA, authorised 20 April 1915

The Divisional Ammunition Column (DAC) was recruited from the Hull City Police and Hull Corporation Tramways Depot by Lord Nunburnholme, Lord Lieutenant of the East Riding of Yorkshire and Chairman of the East Riding Territorial Association, who had already raised the Hull Pals battalions and the 11th (Hull) Heavy Battery, Royal Garrison Artillery (RGA) in September 1914. The same WO authorisation (3 February) also included the 124th (Hull) Heavy Battery, RGA, for the division. (Note: Lord Nunburnholme continued to send gifts to 32nd (Hull) DAC when it was at the front, such as a lending library of 200 books at Christmas 1916.)

The WO then decided to convert the earlier K4 battalions into reserve units to train reinforcements for the K1–K3 units, and on 27 April 1915 the K5 divisions were renumbered to take up the vacant designations of the K4 formations. The short-lived 38th Division thus became 31st Division.

== Training ==
The New Army brigades of the RFA were organised into four 4-gun batteries, designated A, B, C and D, with a Brigade Ammunition Column (BAC). To start with, the men were billeted in their own homes and training was carried out locally, hampered by an almost total lack of equipment and instructors. Brigadier-General S.E.G. Lawless was appointed Commander, Royal Artillery (CRA) for the new division on 7 May 1915 and towards the end of May and early June the division began to assemble at South Camp, Ripon, where more serious training could begin. CLV Brigade was officially taken over by the military authorities from the recruiting committee on 25 July 1915, 124th (Hull) Heavy Bty on 12 August, and the rest of the divisional artillery and DAC on 1 September. In September the divisional artillery moved to Fovant, where battle training was carried out on Salisbury Plain. The batteries were equipped with 18-pounder guns and 4.5-inch howitzers. Brigadier-General J.A. Tyler took over as CRA on 16 November.

On 29 November the division was warned that it would embark for the Western Front on 6 December. Advance parties left for the embarkation ports, but on 2 December the orders were changed: the infantry would instead sail for Egypt with 32nd Division's artillery, leaving its own artillery behind.

31st Divisional Artillery continued its training at Larkhill Camp for another month, and then went to France at the end of the year to join 32nd Division. The former 31st Divisional Artillery became 32nd Divisional Artillery (32nd DA) for the rest of the war.

By the time 32nd DA embarked for France, the policy was to remove heavy batteries from infantry divisions and concentrate them into heavy artillery groups (HAGs), so 124th (Hull) Heavy Bty did not go with it, landing independently in France in April 1916.

== Western Front ==
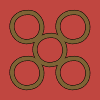
32nd Division's formation sign.

The Divisional Artillery joined 32nd Division between 31 December 1915 and 3 January 1916. This was another division of Pals battalions recruited largely in Birmingham, Salford and Glasgow. It had been in France since late November 1915, temporarily supported by the Divisional Artillery of 53rd (Welsh) Division of the Territorial Force (TF).

Most howitzer brigades in the BEF had three batteries, but the TF only had two and the New Army had four, so on 16 February D (H) Bty of CLXIV (H) Bde was transferred to IV West Riding Howitzer Bde (recruited from Otley) in 49th (West Riding) Division.

In March and April, the division's infantry brigades formed light trench mortar batteries (TMBs). Then a brigade of medium and heavy trench mortars was formed by the divisional artillery. The establishment was one heavy and three medium TMBs per division, but 32nd Division was allotted two heavy and five medium to increase its firepower for the planned 'Big Push' (the Battle of the Somme). In April the 32nd (Hull) Heavy Trench Mortar Battery was formed with men drawn from 32nd (Hull) DAC, together with a few RGA men, and moved to Aveluy for training. It was designated V/32 Heavy TMB and was joined in May by W/32 Heavy TMB, formed by men drawn from 32nd DAC and CLXI, CLXIV and CLXVIII BACs. These batteries were equipped with French 9.45-inch Heavy Mortars (known as 'flying pigs'). The five Medium TMBs (A, B, X, Y and Z, each equipped with four 2-inch Medium Mortars) were formed by the end of May with personnel drawn from the DAC and various batteries and HQs in 32nd DA. V/32 and W/32 Heavy TMBs joined the division from the TM School by the end of June.

On 26 May the field brigades of 32nd DA were reorganised so that the three senior brigades each had three 18-pdr batteries and one of 4.5inch howitzers:

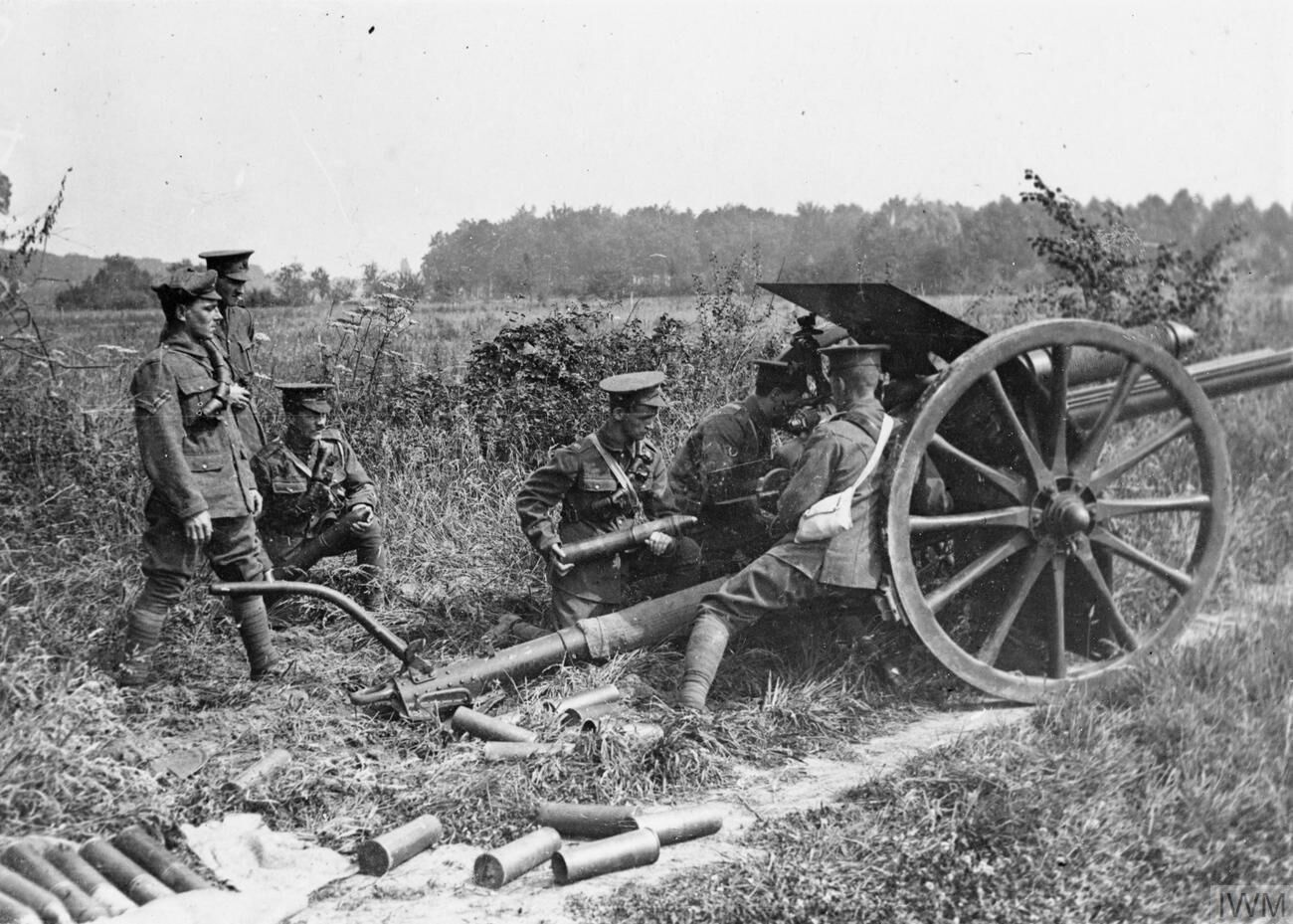
An 18-pounder in action on the Somme.

- CLV (West Yorkshire) Brigade
  - A, B, C Btys
  - D (H) Bty (former A (H)/CLXIV Bty)
- CLXI (Yorkshire) Brigade
  - A, B, C Btys
  - D (H) Bty (former B (H)/CLXIV Bty)
- CLXIV (Rotherham) Brigade
  - A Bty (former D/CLV Bty)
  - B Bty (former D/CLXI Bty)
  - C Bty (former D/CLXVIII Bty)
  - D (H) Bty (former C (H)/CLXIV Bty)
- CLXVIII (Huddersfield) Brigade
  - A, B, C Btys
- 32nd Trench Mortar Brigade
  - A/32, B/32, X/32, Y/32, Z/32 Medium TMBs
  - V/32, W/32 Heavy TMBs
- 32nd (Hull) DAC

At the same time the BACs were abolished and absorbed into the DAC, which was organised in two echelons: A echelon up with the division (one section with each field brigade); B echelon back with the corps.

=== Somme ===
32nd Division was assigned to X Corps in the newly formed Fourth Army for the Somme Offensive. The division was tasked with attacking out of the valley of the Ancre onto a spur of the Thiepval Plateau to capture the fortified village of Thiepval and the redoubt at the angle of the 'Leipzig Salient'. The division was then to go on to capture a series of strongpoints (including the Wundtwerke or 'Wonder Work') on the reverse slope of the spur. The preparations involved the division digging tens of miles of cable trenches for the artillery communications, while the gunners dug gun emplacements and prepared ammunition dumps. The high proportion of ex-miners among 32nd DA's men aided this work considerably.

Fourth Army planned five days (U, V, W, X and Y) of bombardment before Zero or Z Day, with the 18-pdrs assigned to cutting the barbed wire and 'searching' trenches, villages, woods and hollows, and the 4.5-inch howitzers to destroying communication trenches, machine gun positions, and assisting in bombardment of woods and villages. Both classes of gun were also to interrupt communications, particularly at night, and prevent the enemy from repairing damage to their defences. The heavy trench mortars were directed at villages and strongpoints, while the mediums were to assist in wire-cutting and bombarding the front trenches. On 32nd Division's front the medium mortars were emplaced in saps dug right up to the German wire, to put them in range of the support line on Z day, but this led to a steady trickle of casualties over the preceding days while the mortars were being registered on their targets. The wire-cutting began on 24 June (U Day). After three days the intensity of wire-cutting fire was increased to 4–500 shells per gun per day. Z day was put back by two days because of bad weather, and the bombardment was weaker on the extra days (Y1 and Y2) because of ammunition shortages. Reports on the effect of the wire-cutting varied: a night patrol from 97th Brigade of 32nd Division failed to get through the wire north of the Leipzig Redoubt and were shot down. 32nd Division's heavy trench mortars were stationed at 'Rock Street' and 'Oban Avenue'. The Oban Avenue mortar fired one round every 15 minutes during the night of 30 June, that at Rock Creek was trying to hit an enemy Minenwerfer. They then fired at high intensity from 06.00 to 07.00.

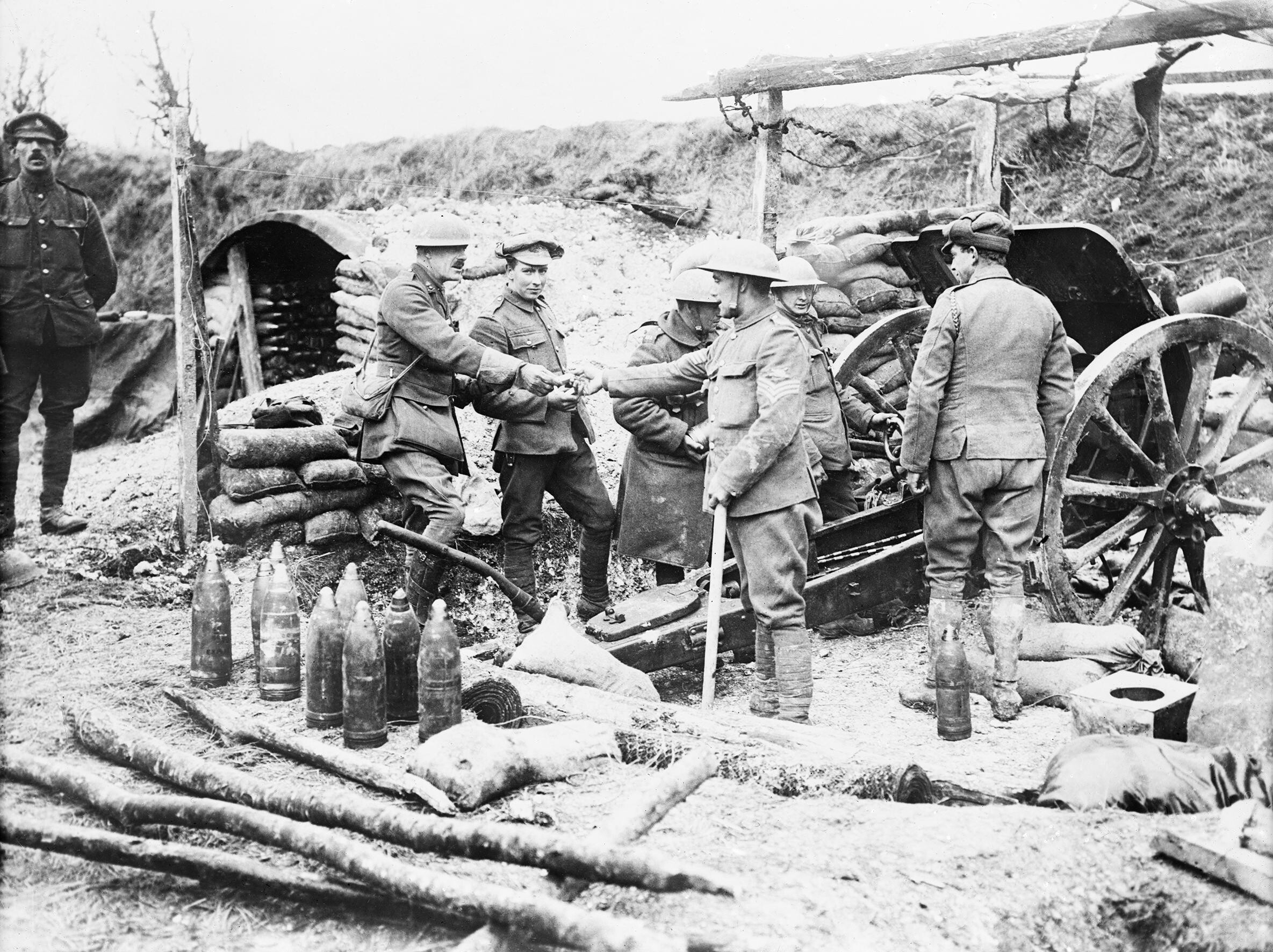
A 4.5-inch howitzer in action on the Somme.

When the infantry went 'over the top' the field guns were to lay down a barrage in front of them. Some artillery commanders tried out a 'Creeping barrage', but in X Corps the 18-pdrs were simply ordered to 'lift' their barrage from one enemy trench to the next as the infantry advanced behind it, while the howitzers concentrated on selected strongpoints along the line of the barrage. Nevertheless, Brig-Gen J.B. Jardine, commanding 97th Bde, ordered his men to creep out into No man's land up to within 40 yards (37 m) of the barrage before attacking the German front line trenches. (Note: Jardine had been an official observer during the Russo-Japanese War and had seen the Japanese use this method successfully.)

When the attack went in at 07.30 on 1 July (the First day on the Somme), the leading waves of 97th Bde found the wire adequately cut by 32nd DA's 'Right Group', and by keeping close to the barrage were able to overrun the Leipzig Redoubt, taking its defenders prisoner. But when the companies moved on without delay towards their next objective, 'Hindenburg Strasse', they were caught on the open slope by the machine guns in the 'Wonder Work' and were halted. Lieutenant-Colonel A.S. Cotton, of CLXI Bde, commanding Right Group, telephoned this information to Brig-Gen Jardine from his Observation Post (OP), adding that the barrage was still going forwards, but no infantry were following it. Strict orders for the barrage insisted that it could not be brought back without higher authority, but Jardine ordered Cotton to take two batteries out of the barrage and switch them onto the defences in the rear of the Leipzig Redoubt, which enabled his infantry to withdraw to the redoubt. 32nd Division's other assault brigade, 96th Bde (supported by 'Left Group' of divisional artillery) met with disaster at the outset, being cut down in No man's land by the machine guns in Thiepval and making no progress, the support companies being halted before going over.

The men of the Heavy TMBs, their fire programme completed, moved forward to carry up ammunition for the infantry and bring back wounded. They could see the piles of dead and wounded where the follow-up infantry had tried to pass through a gap in a hedge and recommended that the next battalion of 14th Bde (2nd Battalion, Manchester Regiment) took a different route via Rock Street. The Manchesters thereby avoided the worst of the machine gun fire and succeeding in reinforcing 97th Bde in the Leipzig Redoubt. The commanding officer of 19th Bn, Lancashire Fusiliers, got the trench mortars to drop a smoke screen, which allowed his men to get up to support 96th Bde by platoon rushes.

After midday individual batteries fired at targets such as machine gun posts requested by the infantry, but there were few Forward Observation Officers (FOOs) with the infantry, and shellfire cut telephone lines, so fire control was poor. A new bombardment of the Wonder Work was arranged, but it was too diffuse to be effective. Erroneous reports that some of 32nd Division had got into Thiepval meant that the village was not fired on until the evening, and its defenders were able to mount counter-attacks against a breakthrough by the neighbouring 36th (Ulster) Division and to cause heavy casualties to the reserves coming up (49th (West Riding) Division). By the end of the day X Corps' only remaining gain was the Leipzig Redoubt. That night and for the next two days the gunners helped to evacuate the thousands of wounded infantrymen.

75th Brigade from 25th Division was loaned to 32nd Division for an attack with 14th Bde to widen the Leipzig Salient lodgement on 3 July, but last-minute changes to plans meant that its attack was poorly coordinated with Cotton's Right Group of guns, and the attack failed.

32nd Division was in action again at the Battle of Bazentin Ridge, on 14 July. This time the wire-cutting was more carefully controlled, with FOOs within 200 yards (180 m) of the German trenches to ensure accuracy. The attack went in before dawn, and the intense final bombardment of the enemy line before Zero was cut from 30 minutes to just 5 minutes to ensure surprise. The 18-pdrs and 4.5s firing the barrage used delayed-action fuses to avoid air-bursts in the trees above the troops forming up for the attack. 32nd Division made a subsidiary attack towards Ovillers. The bombardment was accurate and the infantry followed the barrage closely, so the opening of the attack was a great success, but it was not exploited. Afterwards the division was relieved and moved to the Béthune area for the rest of the summer, the guns and mortars positioned round Cambrin and Annequin. Although this was a quieter sector, there were still trench raids and exchanges of mortar and machine gun fire.

In mid-September 32 DA was reorganised again to bring the 18-pdr batteries up to six guns each, which meant that CLXIV (Rotherham) Bde was broken up on 17 September. This gave the following organisation:

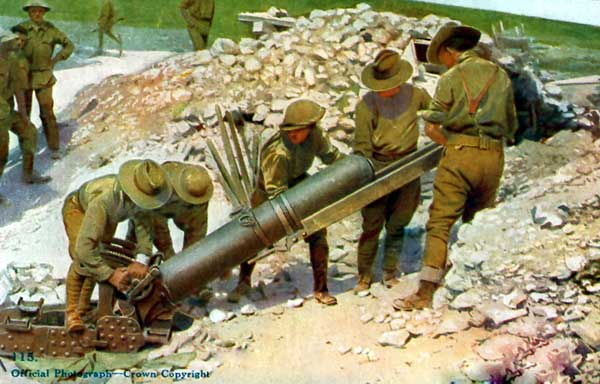
A 9.45-inch heavy mortar, or 'flying pig' (this example on the Somme is manned by Australian troops).

- CLV Bde:
  - A Bty (former C Bty + half A Bty)
  - B Bty (+ half A Bty)
  - C (H) Bty (536 (H) Bty (originally 2/1st Suffolk (H) Bty in 2/III East Anglian (H) Bde) joined 10 October)
  - D (H) Bty
- CLXI Bde
  - A Bty (+ half A/CLXIV Bty)
  - B Bty (+ half A/CLXIV Bty)
  - C Bty (+ half C/CLXVIII Bty)
- CLXVIII Bde
  - A Bty (half A Bty + former C/CLXIV Bty)
  - B Bty (+ half A Bty)
  - C Bty (half C Bty + former B/CLXIV Bty)
  - D (H) Bty (former D (H)/CLXIV Bty)
- 32nd TM Bde
- 32nd DAC

=== Ancre ===
After the BEF's successful advance at the Battle of Flers-Courcelette, the division was ordered back to the Somme sector, though the move did not begin until 16 October and took several days. 32nd Division was in reserve during the Battle of the Ancre Heights (23 October to 11 November), but its artillery was attached to other divisions for the operation: CLXI, CLXVIII and the mortars to 51st (Highland) Division, CLV to 3rd Division. There were numerous casualties during the bombardment, which extended over a number of days.

The Battle of the Ancre, delayed until 13 November by bad weather, was the final phase of the Somme Offensive. A mass of artillery was assembled, including 32nd Division's, to support 51st (H) Division's attack on Beaumont-Hamel. CLV Brigade was deployed around the position known as 'White City', where it suffered some casualties from Counter-battery fire. Seven days of bombardment and wire-cutting preceded the attack. This time a full creeping barrage was employed, starting on the German front line with a quarter of the 18-pounders deliberately firing 50 yards short of the rest, into No man's land, to cover the advancing infantry. Then after six minutes the barrage began advancing at 100 yards (91 m) in 5 minutes. The barrage was to halt for an hour on the first objective, and then move on. The initial pre-dawn attack was a partial success, and attacks continued over succeeding days. 32nd Division's infantry came into the line on 17 November and attacked 'Munich Trench' the following day in 'whirling sleet' and a long way behind their barrage, and were quickly stopped by machine gun fire. That ended the battle, though minor operations continued through the winter. CLV Brigade was pulled out of White City to safer positions by 21 November, and the divisional artillery was relieved on 6 December. It moved to the St Ouen area, with CLV Bde billeted in the nearby village of St Léger and the mortar batteries in outlying farms.

=== CLV Army Field Artillery Brigade ===
In the new year CLV Brigade was converted into an Army Field Artillery (AFA) brigade and left 32nd Division with its section of the DAC on 16 January 1917. As their title implies, AFA brigades were allocated by Army HQs to different formations as required. CLV went on to serve at the battles of Arras and Messines, the Third Ypres Offensive, the German spring offensive and the final Hundred Days Offensive.

=== Winter 1916–17 ===
When CLV Bde left, C (H) Bty (formerly 536 Bty) remained behind to bring the howitzer batteries of CLXI and CLXVIII Bdes up to six guns each. By 28 December 1916 32nd TM Bde had adopted the normal establishment of three medium and one heavy battery. The composition of 32nd DA was now as follows:

- CLXI Bde
  - A, B, C Btys
  - D (H) Bty (+ half 536 (H) Bty)
- CLXVIII Bde
  - A, B, C Btys
  - D (H) Bty (+ half 536 (H) Bty)
- 32nd TM Bde
  - X/32. Y/32, Z/32 Medium TMBs
  - V/32 Heavy TMB
- 32nd DAC

From 9 to 16 January and again from 29 January to 19 February 1917, Brig-Gen Tyler was acting divisional commander, and this included a small action on the Ancre on 11 January when 32nd DA supported an attack by a brigade of 7th Division against Munich Trench on the Beaumont-Hamel Spur, which had defied the attacks on 1 July 1916 and again in November. At 06.37, 10 minutes before zero and in thick fog, the guns of 32nd, 7th and 3rd Divisions put down a standing barrage on Munich Trench and a creeping barrage in front of the assaulting troops. The ground was so muddy that the infantry were given ample time to cross it: the barrage crept at just 50 yards (46 m) yards every five minutes, thought to be the slowest of the war. One strongpoint held out until 08.00 despite the attentions of the howitzers, but all the limited objectives were achieved and the Germans had lost their observation posts on the spur. Over the following days 32nd Division pushed its way well over the crest, and the support of the field artillery was crucial in these minor advances: four batteries of 32nd DA assisted 63rd (Royal Naval) Division in an attack on 1 February, and on the night of 10 February 32nd Division took Ten Tree Trench. 97th Brigade had carefully rehearsed this attack, which was carried out under a barrage by 32nd DA. Later in February the division was moved south to take over part of the line from the French, with 32nd DA's HQ at Le Quesnel and the TM brigade at Beaufort-en-Santerre. The gun positions taken over from the French were strongly built, with deep dugouts and connecting tunnels, but the trench mortar positions were too far back for the short-range British mortars, and new ones had to be improvised in sap-heads 200 yards (180 m) from the enemy line.

=== Operation Alberich ===
Brigadier-General Frederick Lumsden, VC, posthumous portrait by H. Donald Smith, 1920.

On 12 March, 32nd DA supported a raid by the neighbouring French division, firing 527 18-pdr shells and 210 rounds of 4.5-inch. After the German withdrawal to the Hindenburg Line (Operation Alberich) got under way two days later, 32nd DA was ordered on 16 March to cooperate with the 62nd French Infantry Division. The attack hit thin air, and the men of the TMBs enthusiastically went forward to explore the abandoned German positions. The pursuit then got under way. By 28 March the division was actually ahead of its allotted positions, in order to keep touch with its French neighbours. The division had two brigades in line, each with two companies in the outposts, and the third brigade in reserve; 32nd DA had one RFA brigade forward to cover the outposts, the other two covering the brigades in line.

By 1 April the division was closing up on the Hindenburg Line outposts and carried out a rapid operation to cut out a strong enemy position at Holnon Wood. With the artillery moving cross-country in daylight and coming into action from three separate positions the Official History commented that this was perhaps the first example of truly open warfare by the BEF since 1914. The RA historian commended the neat fireplan adopted by 32nd DA and the speed with which the guns came into action and delivered their barrages. The Germans were unable to get one battery of six field guns away, and these lay abandoned in No man's land. After a failed attempt by Lt Ward of CLXI Bde to bring these guns in, Maj Frederick Lumsden, a Royal Marine Artillery officer on 32nd Division staff, led out a party of infantry with Ward's gunners on the night of 5/6 April, followed by Lt E.C. Trappes-Lomax with the drivers and gun teams to drag them back. They ran into a party of German Stosstruppen (storm troops) bent on destroying the guns, and there was a sharp fight before the British removed the guns, only one of which was damaged. Major Lumsden was awarded the Victoria Cross for this action and achieved rapid promotion to brigadier-general. 32nd Trench Mortar Bde provided gunners to fire the five serviceable guns that had been captured, hitting the cathedral in St Quentin behind the Hindenburg Line with their first shot, and firing about 100 rounds altogether.

On 14 April 32nd Division attacked Fayet, another Hindenburg Line outpost. The operation was carried out at 04.30 by 97th Bde supported by 14th Bde. Fayet was successfully cleared, but counter-attacks pressed the attackers back, and the position was dominated by the copses north of Fayet. The artillery cover was commanded by Lt-Col Cotton of CLXI Bde, who also had CLXVIII and CLIX Bdes (the latter attached from 35th Division) at his disposal. Cotton quickly planned a new bombardment of the copses for 13.00. 11th Battalion Border Regiment hastily withdrew from its forward position that would be shelled, concentrated in the valley, and then advanced over open ground to take the copses. 97th Brigade then completed its operation, driving a large number of prisoners into the arms of 35th Division. The Official History describes the combined infantry–artillery operation as 'a fine example of good organization, judicious delegation of authority, and quick movement, allied with determination'.

=== Messines ===
32nd Division was then moved to the area south of Ypres (a hard march for gunners unused to it), joining XIV Corps in reserve for the forthcoming Battle of Messines. Although the infantry of XIV Corps were not used, the divisional artilleries were allocated to the attacking corps, with 32nd DA supporting X Corps. These batteries were not involved in the preliminary bombardments or the barrages at zero, but remained 'masked'. However, the HQ of 32nd TM Bde was hit the day before the battle by heavy shells, with serious casualties. The attack at 04.10 on 7 June began with the explosion of 19 huge mines and a massive barrage. The initial assaults were highly successful, watched by 32nd DA's observers from the viewpoint of Mont Kemmel, well behind the lines. However, Second Army HQ considered that the toughest fighting would come later in the morning when the first shock had worn off and the German counter-attack Eingreif divisions came into play. It was now that the XIV Corps batteries were unmasked to strengthen the protective barrage, which was 'creeping' backwards and forwards to check any enemy movements while the British infantry prepared for their second advance. In fact no counter-attackers appeared until around 14.00, and on X Corps' front they merely reinforced the weak German garrison of the second line (the Osttaverne Line). Zero for the second attack by the British follow-up divisions was 15.10, and the previously masked batteries participated, with 32nd DA supporting the attack by 24th Division, which captured its objectives in the Osttaverne Line without trouble. When the counter-attacks did come, they were beaten off.

=== Flanders ===
The BEF's next offensive would be in Flanders, with the main attack at Ypres while forces were gathered at Nieuport to take advantage of the expected breakthrough with their own attack along the coast (Operation Hush). 32nd Division was sent to Nieuport on 20 June, and spent the whole summer there. On 10 July the German Marine-Korps-Flandern put in a spoiling attack (Operation Strandfest)., accompanied by a heavy bombardment. 32nd Division's telephone cables were quickly severed by the shelling and the fighting reverted to local control. The neighbouring 1st Division was forced back, losing its bridgeheads over the River Yser. 32nd Division came under heavy attack but held onto its positions before the line settled down again. 32nd Division was badly outgunned and suffered frequent bombardments and casualties, and on 12 July three additional RFA brigades were attached to 32nd DA. It remained in control of the sector even when the infantry were relieved by another division later in the month, meaning that 32nd DA HQ had 10 brigades under its command in a cramped area. The gun lines were badly affected by gas shelling and night bombing. The British retaliated with repeated cloud gas attacks and the guns were ordered not to fire into the same area (so as not to disperse the clouds) but to hit the German communications. By October it was plain that the coastal operation was not going to come off, so the division was switched to Ypres where the offensive (the Third Battle of Ypres) was continuing.

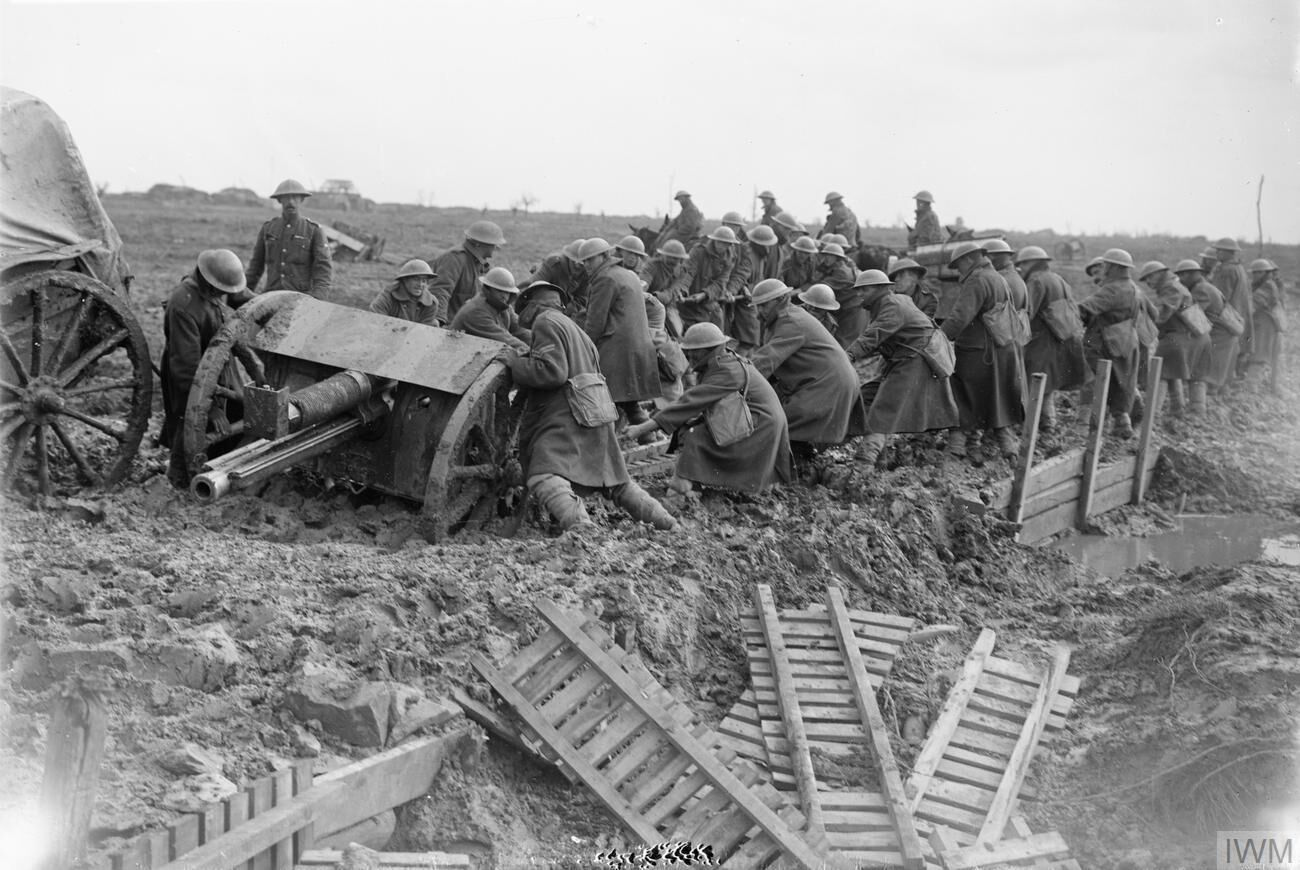
Hauling an 18-pounder out of the mud near Langemarck, autumn 1917.

=== Winter 1917–18 ===
32nd Division was stationed in the north of the Ypres Salient at St Julien, occupying the line captured in the First Battle of Passchendaele. It was not engaged in the final bottles of the offensive, which took place further south, but on the night of 2/3 December the division put in a moonlight attack on Passchendaele Ridge in an attempt to gain better positions for the winter. However, the only available gun positions were in enfilade of the position to be attacked, from which creeping barrages could not be fired. In any case the mud was too thick for the infantry to make much progress and they were driven back. There were regular casualties through the winter from bombing and long-range shelling. Early in 1918 the division extended its front to take over Langemark in front of Houthulst Forest, and carried out raids south of the forest on 18/19 and 27/28 February.

On 12 February 1918 the TMBs were reorganised: heavy mortars had become an RGA responsibility under corps control and in 32nd TM Bde V Heavy Bty ceased to exist and became X Medium Bty, and Y and Z Medium Btys were merged to become Y Bty; the old X Bty was broken up between the two new batteries. Both batteries were now equipped with six Newton 6-inch Mortars.

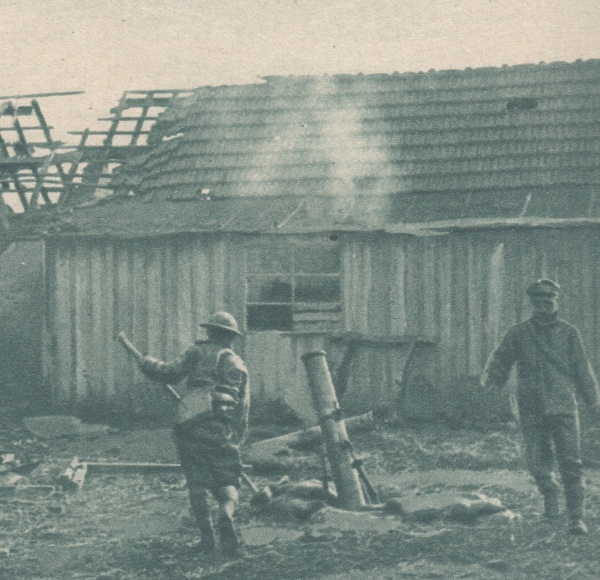
A Newton 6-inch medium mortar in 1918 (this example is manned by Canadian troops).

=== Spring Offensive ===
The German spring offensive was launched on 21 March, and 32nd Division was among the formations sent south from Ypres. On 27 March it began reinforcing VI Corps south of Arras where it held the northern 'hinge' of the German breakthrough. On 28 March the Germans renewed their efforts against this pivot point, but failed and attacks on this sector ended by 31 March, before 32nd DA's batteries were in position.

The Germans held the village of Ayette, which gave them good observation over the British lines. 32nd Division achieved one of its biggest successes with an attacks against this target on the night of 2/3 April. A converging attack was launched without a preliminary bombardment but covered by a slow creeping barrage for which the CRA, Brig-Gen Tyler, had 31st and 34th DA under command in addition to his own guns. Ayette was successfully taken and incorporated into the British defences, screening the lines behind.

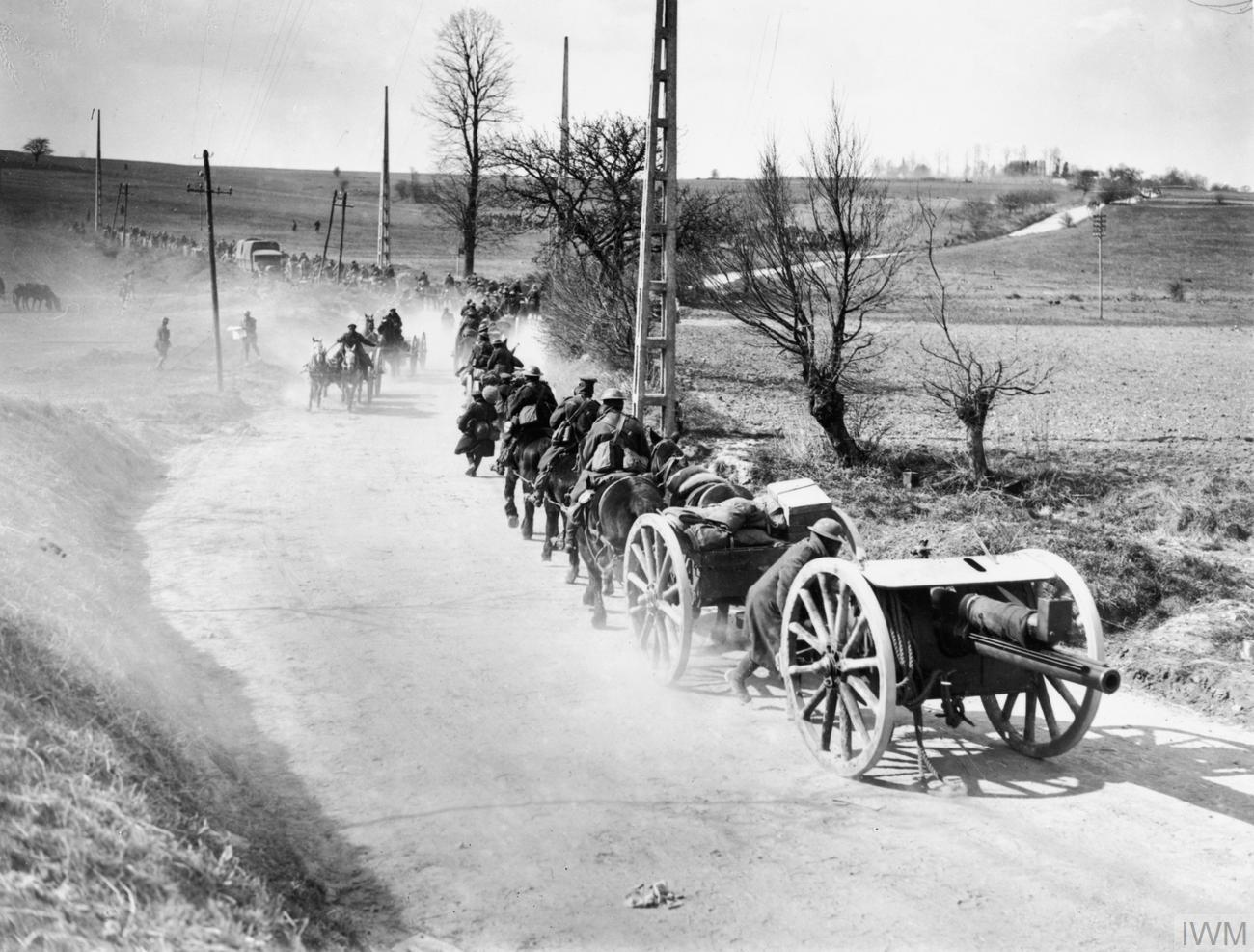
A battery of 18-pounders moving up to meet the German offensive, Spring 1918.

VI Corps continued to hold and improve this line for the next three months as the focus of German attention moved elsewhere. CLV (West Yorkshire) AFA Bde was re-attached to 32nd DA on 18 May; it went into GHQ Reserve on 31 May but was back with 32nd DA from 18 June to 7 July, around Berles-au-Bois. The Arras sector was quiet but there was a steady trickle of casualties from shells and bombs, the gun lines suffering badly from gas shelling.

In July the division entrained for the Kemmel area where it was in reserve in case of attack, but with the artillery constructing new gun positions for a projected Allied attack to regain the high ground lost in April.

=== Hundred Days Offensive ===
On 6 August 32 DA was entrained for Amiens to support Canadian Corps in following up after the great attack of 8 August (the Battle of Amiens). After detraining it made the last part of the journey by road, with the infantry brought up by bus, through roads crammed with transport for the offensive. The CRA's HQ was established at Cagny on 8 August and an advanced HQ at Domart next day. The division was ordered to attack at dawn on 10 August. During the night 32nd DA's waggon lines were bombed, delaying the batteries from going into action until 10.30 in the morning. The infantry had passed through the Canadians at 08.00, but found the going hard through the overgrown devastation of the old Somme battlefield and they ran into stiffening resistance. The Canadians did take le Quesnoy but overall the results were disappointing. Two further attacks next day achieved little and on 12 August the infantry were relieved by Canadian troops. 32nd Divisional Artillery remained in the line, however, supporting the Canadians' attacks and causing heavy casualties to the German counter-attack.

On 19 August the division transferred to Australian Corps and RA HQ was established in a quarry on the outskirts of Villers-Bretonneux, but then moved to Bayonvillers to be nearer the line. The division attacked on 21 August (the Battle of Albert). No preliminary bombardment was fired; the advance was made behind a creeping barrage (10 per cent smoke shell, 45 per cent High explosive shell and 45 per cent Shrapnel shell) that dropped 200 yards (180 m) ahead of the line at Zero (04.45). 97th Brigade quickly took Herleville, the infantry getting among the enemy while they were still sheltering from the barrage. A gap opened between 97th Bde and the Australians to its left, but the German machine-gunners who took advantage of this were dealt with by trench mortars.

On the night of 24 August Brig-Gen Tyler was away, standing in for the wounded Brig-Gen Lionel Sadleir-Jackson commanding 54th Infantry Bde in 18th (Eastern) Division, when 32nd Division's HQ was bombed by a German aircraft. The building occupied by 32nd DA HQ was hit, and all those inside wounded to a greater or lesser extent: Lt-Col Lord Wynford, who had only taken over as acting CRA that day, the reconnaissance officer, Lt A.B. Scott, and others were evacuated to a Casualty Clearing Station where the staff captain, Capt Ludovic Heathcoat-Amory, Royal Devon Yeomanry, a former first class cricketer, died the following day.

Australian Corps continued to push on against German rearguards during late August (the Second Battle of Bapaume) and 32nd Division reached the River Somme on 1 September. Patrols were unable to cross the river but on 5 September the division forced the crossings. Most divisions were now operating as separate 'brigade groups', with their own artillery, engineers and mounted troops attached. B/CLXVIII Battery was pushed up in close support for the crossing, shelling a troublesome copse and contributing to the capture of the enemy within it. The division then advanced 3 miles (4.8 km) beyond the river while the engineers and pioneers built bridges to bring over the guns. The advance continued over the next five days, and on 10 September 32nd Division cleared Holnon Wood, scene of its success the previous year.

The Germans had now fallen back to the Hindenburg Line, and there was a pause while the Allies prepared to storm this position. 32nd Division was transferred to IX Corps as its reserve. IX Corps was newly reformed and had been given the task of forcing the St Quentin Canal, considered one of the toughest sections of the Hindenburg Line. The canal was to be crossed by 46th (North Midland) Division, supported by 32nd DA and five AFA brigades as well as its own divisional artillery. Although the field artillery had not registered their guns, and the FOOs could see nothing through the morning mist and smoke barrage, the creeping barrage starting at 05.50 on 29 September was described as 'one of the finest ever seen'. It was arranged as 100 yards (91 m) 'lifts' (40 in total) at a pace of one every two minutes while the infantry rushed down to the canal, then one every four minutes for the rest of the operation, punctuated by standing protective barrages at each objective. Following the barrage the infantry of 137th (Staffordshire) Bde stormed across the canal using life-belts, improvised bridges, and Riqueval Bridge, which was captured intact. The brigade then reformed, protected by the barrage, before moving on again at 07.30. By 08.20 137th Bde had taken its second intermediate objective, and the other two brigades crossed to continue the attack when the barrage lifted again at 11.20. 32nd Division next crossed the canal, and its leading brigades were in position by 17.30. 32nd Divisional Artillery had begun limbering up and moving forward at 10.00: 'the valley in which they were was a most wonderful sight, black with crowds of gun teams swarming up to get the guns forward', the Chaplain remarked. However, the earliest that 32nd DA could provide a barrage was 18.00, and by then the German defence was stiffening. 32nd Division's attack did not make much progress, although 14th Bde did capture its second objective.

32nd Division made good the rest of the objectives the following morning with local barrages, before 97th Bde attacked Levergies in the evening with a 'crash' barrage. The division pushed forward slowly towards the Hindenburg Reserve Position (the 'Beaurevoir Line'), then handed over part of the line to the refreshed 46th (NM) Division to make the main attack (the Battle of the Beaurevoir Line) on 3 October. Meanwhile 32nd secured Sequehart, which it had failed to capture the day before, with 97th Bde (temporarily commanded by the CRA, Brig-Gen Tyler) rolling up the line. On 4 October the field artillery supported a failed attack on Mannequin Hill, after which the tired infantry were withdrawn into reserve, while 32nd DA continued supporting the other formations of IX Corps. On 8 October 6th Division carried out a joint attack on Mannequin Wood with the French, for which CLXVIII Bde fired the British part of the barrage. By next morning the brigade was out of range because of the rapidity of the enemy retreat, and 32nd DA was relieved for a rest.

32nd Divisional Artillery was back in the line for the Battle of the Selle beginning on 17 October, attached once more to 6th Division. One of 6th Division's brigades got caught up in uncut wire and lost the barrage, but the rest easily reached the intermediate target before 1st Division passed through, but they also lost the barrage, which had to be called back to support the attack on the final position. The field batteries had been due to move forward from their positions at Busigny having fired their planned barrage, so the improvised barrage was ragged and the division fell short of the final objective.

IX Corps advanced again on 23 October, towards the Sambre–Oise Canal, with 32nd and 46th DA both supporting 1st Division. However, the Germans put down a heavy defensive fireplan just before Zero (01.20), causing considerable damage among 32nd DA's batteries and disrupting the advance of one of 1st Division's brigades. Nevertheless, the artillery support for the attack was so overwhelming that 1st Division met little opposition and was on its objectives by 05.30, protected by a standing barrage

32nd Division came back into the line for the Passage of the Sambre–Oise Canal planned for 4 November. First however, the division tried to clear the Happegarbes Spur that enfiladed its positions. On 2 November 15 Bn Lancashire Fusiliers advanced under a barrage at took it, but were turned off it again. Reinforced, the battalion tried again next day, but had to be withdrawn at nightfall.

The set-piece crossing of the canal was carried out on 4 November, with a slowly advancing barrage as the infantry and engineers went forward with the bridging material. 14th and 96th Brigades attempted to cross either side of Ors, with a special barrage laid on for two platoons of 5th/6th Bn Royal Scots who were to try to cross at le Donjon. There was fierce fighting and the attacks north of Ors and at le Donjon failed, but 1st Bn Dorsetshire Regiment got across and the rest of the division followed across their bridge. A second barrage had been laid on against some opposition, but the final advance to the corps objective did not require any artillery support. The German artillery began pulling back early in the battle, but a gun-pit of 32nd TM Bde near Ors received a direct hit, which blew up the ammunition, killing two officers and five other ranks.

As the pursuit continued, CLXVIII Bde was pulled out of the line, while CLXI kept advancing with 97th Bde. On 7 November its guns were unable to suppress the machine guns of a German rearguard at Avesnes and they had to wait for a bridge to be built for heavier guns to be brought up. Next morning 97th Bde 'dribbled' forward in small numbers until at midday CLXI Bde put down a barrage and the infantry rushed the German posts and pushed through Avesnes. Next day the infantry patrols encountered little or no opposition as they tried to keep touch with the retreating enemy, and the whole of Fourth Army halted on 10 November while the cavalry searched forwards.

== Postwar ==
32nd Division was still occupying Avesnes when the Armistice with Germany came into effect on 11 November. Two days later it was informed that it would take part in the advance to the Rhine, which began on 19 November. However, the division was halted on the Meuse between Dinant and Namur, to act as reserve for the British Army of the Rhine (BAOR). On 28 January 1919 the division began entraining for Bonn and on 3 February it took over the southern sector of the Cologne bridgehead while demobilisation of individuals continued. On 15 March the division was renamed the Lancashire Division in BAOR. The RFA brigades were disbanded during 1919.

== Commanders ==
The following officers served as CRA of 32nd DA:

- Brig-Gen S.E.G. Lawless from 7 May 1915 (31st DA)
- Brig-Gen J.A. Tyler from 16 November 1915 (31st DA, then 32nd DA to Armistice)
- Lt-Col R. Fitzmaurice, acting 29 January–19 February 1917
- Lt-Col Lord Wynford, acting 24 August 1918, wounded same day
- Lt-Col C.R.B. Charrington, acting 25 August–24 September and 2–6 October 1918

== Memorials ==
A memorial plaque to the 61 dead of the '32nd Divisional R.A. Trench Mortar Batteries' was erected in the north transept of York Minster on 5 June 1921.

Ludovic Heathcoat-Amory's name is included on the war memorial in Tom Quad at Christ Church, Oxford.

== Notes ==
- C.T. Atkinson, The Seventh Division 1914–1918, London: John Murray, 1927/Uckfield: Naval & Military Press, 2006.
- Maj A.F. Becke,History of the Great War: Order of Battle of Divisions, Part 3a: New Army Divisions (9–26), London: HM Stationery Office, 1938/Uckfield: Naval & Military Press, 2007, ISBN 1-847347-41-X.
- Maj A.F. Becke,History of the Great War: Order of Battle of Divisions, Part 3b: New Army Divisions (30–41) and 63rd (R.N.) Division, London: HM Stationery Office, 1939/Uckfield: Naval & Military Press, 2007, ISBN 1-847347-41-X.
- David Bilton, Hull Pals, 10th, 11th 12th and 13th Battalions East Yorkshire Regiment – A History of 92 Infantry Brigade, 31st Division, Barnsley: Pen & Sword, 2014, ISBN 978-1-78346-185-1.
- Gregory Blaxland, Amiens: 1918, London: Frederick Muller, 1968/Star, 1981, ISBN 0-352-30833-8.
- Brig-Gen Sir James E. Edmonds, History of the Great War: Military Operations, France and Belgium, 1916, Vol I, London: Macmillan,1932/Woking: Shearer, 1986, ISBN 0-946998-02-7.
- Brig-Gen Sir James E. Edmonds, History of the Great War: Military Operations, France and Belgium 1917, Vol II, Messines and Third Ypres (Passchendaele), London: HM Stationery Office, 1948/Uckfield: Imperial War Museum and Naval and Military Press, 2009, ISBN 978-1-845747-23-7.
- Brig-Gen Sir James E. Edmonds, History of the Great War: Military Operations, France and Belgium 1918, Vol II, March–April: Continuation of the German Offensives, London: Macmillan, 1937/Imperial War Museum and Battery Press, 1995, ISBN 1-87042394-1/Uckfield: Naval & Military Press, 2009, ISBN 978-1-84574-726-8.
- Brig-Gen Sir James E. Edmonds, History of the Great War: Military Operations, France and Belgium 1918, Vol IV, 8th August–26th September: The Franco-British Offensive, London: Macmillan, 1939/Uckfield: Imperial War Museum and Naval & Military, 2009, ISBN 978-1-845747-28-2.
- Brig-Gen Sir James E. Edmonds & Lt-Col R. Maxwell-Hyslop, History of the Great War: Military Operations, France and Belgium 1918, Vol V, 26th September–11th November, The Advance to Victory, London: HM Stationery Office, 1947/Imperial War Museum and Battery Press, 1993, ISBN 1-870423-06-2.
- Capt Cyril Falls, History of the Great War: Military Operations, France and Belgium 1917, Vol I, The German Retreat to the Hindenburg Line and the Battle of Arras, London: Macmillan, 1940/London: Imperial War Museum & Battery Press/Uckfield: Naval and Military Press, 2009, ISBN 978-1-84574722-0.
- Gen Sir Martin Farndale, History of the Royal Regiment of Artillery: Western Front 1914–18, Woolwich: Royal Artillery Institution, 1986, ISBN 1-870114-00-0.
- Gen Sir Anthony Farrar-Hockley, The Somme, London: Batsford, 1954/Pan 1966, ISBN 0-330-20162-X.
- J.B.M. Frederick, Lineage Book of British Land Forces 1660–1978, Vol II, Wakefield: Microform Academic, 1984, ISBN 1-85117-009-X.
- Andrew Jackson, Accrington's Pals: The Full Story, Barnsley, Pen & Sword, 2013, ISBN 9781-84884-469-8.
- Martin Middlebrook, The First Day on the Somme, 1 July 1916, London: Allen Lane 1971/Fontana, 1975, ISBN 0-00-633626-4.
- Capt Wilfred Miles, History of the Great War: Military Operations, France and Belgium 1916, Vol II, 2nd July 1916 to the End of the Battles of the Somme, London: Macmillan, 1938/Imperial War Museum & Battery Press, 1992, ISBN 0-89839-169-5.
- Stuart Bruce Taylor Mitchell, An Inter-Disciplinary Study of Learning in the 32nd Division on the Western Front, 1916–1918, University of Birmingham PhD thesis, 2013.
- Simon Peaple, Mud, Blood and Determination: The History of the 46th (North Midland) Division in the Great War, Solihull: Helion, 2015, ISBN 978-1-910294-66-6.
- Maj R.E. Priestley, Breaking the Hindenburg Line: The Story of the 46th (North Midland) Division, London: T. Fisher Unwin, 1919/Uckfield: Naval & Military Press, 2002 ISBN 978-1-843422-66-2.
- R. Whinyates (ed), Artillery and Trench Mortar Memories: 32nd Division, 32nd Divisional (RA) Trench Mortar Association, 1932/Uckfield: Naval and Military Press, 2004, ISBN 1-843429-77-2.
- Instructions Issued by The War Office During July, 1915, London: HM Stationery Office.
- Instructions Issued by The War Office During September, 1915, London: HM Stationery Office

== External sources ==
- Commonwealth War Graves Commission records
- Imperial War Museum, War Memorials Register
- Kingston upon Hull War Memorial 1914–1918
- The Long, Long Trail
