= 12th (Service) Battalion, Gloucestershire Regiment (Bristol's Own) =

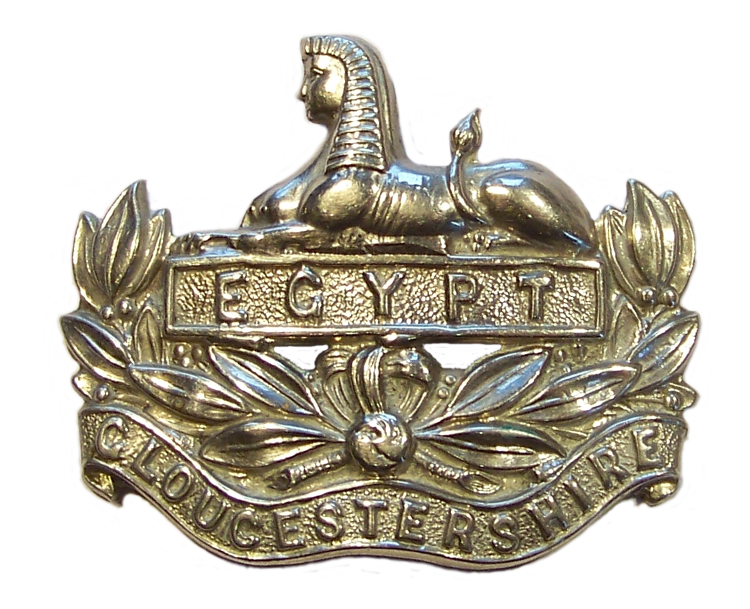
- Cap badge of the Gloucestershire Regiment
- Active: 30 August 1914 – 19 October 1918
- Country: United Kingdom
- Branch: New Army
- Type: Infantry
- Size: Battalion
- Part of: 32nd Division; 5th Division
- Garrison/HQ: Greville Smyth Park, Bristol
- Engagements: Longueval; Guillemont; Fresnoy; Passchendaele; Italian Front; Gloucester Farm; Irles

Commanders
- Notable commanders: Lt-Col Martin Archer-Shee, DSO

Insignia
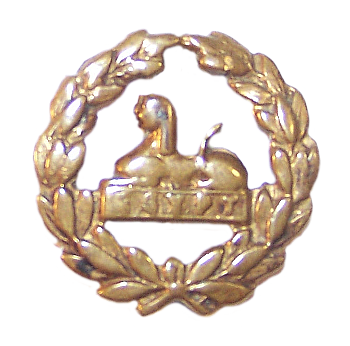
- The Glosters' 'Back Badge'

The 12th (Service) Battalion (Bristol's Own) of the Gloucestershire Regiment was a 'Pals battalion' of 'Kitchener's Army' raised immediately after the outbreak of World War I through the initiative of the City of Bristol. It saw action at the Somme, Arras and Ypres, before moving to the Italian Front. It returned to the Western Front to fight in the German spring offensive and the victorious Allied Hundred Days Offensive.

== Recruitment ==
Alfred Leete's recruitment poster for Kitchener's Army

On 6 August 1914, less than 48 hours after Britain's declaration of war, Parliament sanctioned an increase of 500,000 men for the Regular British Army, and the newly appointed Secretary of State for War, Earl Kitchener of Khartoum issued his famous call to arms: 'Your King and Country Need You', urging the first 100,000 volunteers to come forward. This group of six divisions with supporting arms became known as Kitchener's First New Army, or 'K1'.

A flood of volunteers poured into the recruiting offices across the country and were formed into 'Service' battalions of the county regiments. However, the Bristol Chamber of Commerce considered that the city's response was inadequate and formed a Bristol Citizens' Recruiting Committee under the leadership of the former Lord Mayor, Sir Herbert Ashman, to encourage enlistment. The city's Colston Hall was opened as a recruiting centre on 14 August, and 2,274 men enlisted by 2 September; 80 men calling themselves the Weston Comrades Company also joined from Weston-super-Mare. It was clear that many of these men wanted to serve together in a special Bristol battalion, similar to other 'Pals battalions' being formed around the country. The War Office gave the committee authority to form the Bristol Battalion, Gloucestershire Regiment, on 30 August. Later in the year it became part of Kitchener's Fifth New Army (K5) and was officially numbered as the 12th (Service) Battalion, Gloucestershire Regiment (Bristol), but the subtitle was usually rendered as 'Bristol's Own'.

The recruiting committee encouraged 'mercantile and professional' men to apply, both through reasons of social exclusiveness and with a view to Kitchener's directive that workers in vital industries could not be spared. The first commanding officer was William Burges, who had retired from command of the 3rd Militia Battalion of the Gloucestershire Regiment some years before. Several of the other officers appointed had experience in the Regular or Auxiliary forces, and a number of junior officers had been members of their school or university Officer Training Corps.

== Training ==
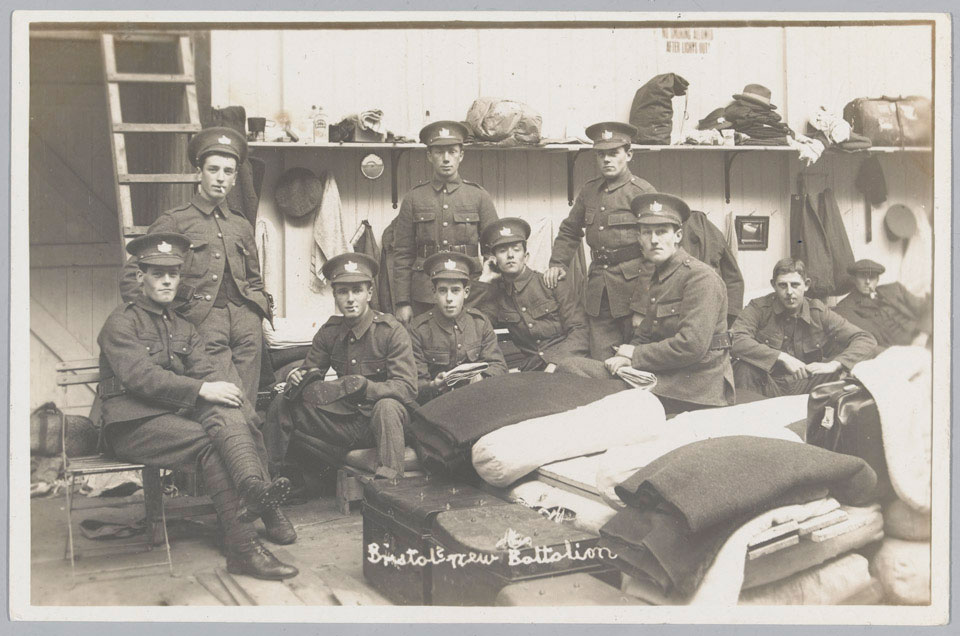
New recruits inside a barrack room, belonging to the 12th (Service) Battalion, Gloucestershire Regiment, 1914.

The rush of recruits had overwhelmed the Army's ability to absorb them, so the Pals Battalions of K5 were left for some time in the hands of the recruiting committees. Initially, the Bristol men lived at home and drilled by squads at Colston Hall in their civilian clothes, distinguished only by a lapel badge bearing the words 'New Bristol Battalion Gloucestershire Regt'. They then began battalion drills at the Artillery Grounds in Whiteladies Road, the headquarters of the I South Midland (Gloucestershire) Brigade, Royal Field Artillery of the Territorial Force. But in late September the recruiting committee persuaded the War Office to buy up the site of the abandoned Bristol International Exhibition in Greville Smyth Park, the buildings of which were converted into barracks by the Royal Engineers and Army Service Corps. The 'Weston Comrades' joined the rest of the battalion here in November and were posted to D Company.

Some of the battalion's best men were already being posted away, for officer training for example, and on 30 November the War Office authorised the recruiting committee to raise a fifth, reserve company (E Company); F Company was raised as a further reserve in April 1915. Old rifles had been issued to the battalion for drill purposes, with just a few modern Lee-Enfield .303 SMLE rifles for musketry training. Uniforms were finally received in December 1914. In March 1915, the battalion began field training by companies at Chipping Sodbury.

The locally raised units to form K5 were assigned to brigades on 10 December 1914: the Bristol Battalion was brigaded with the 1st, 2nd and 3rd Birmingham Pals (later 14th, 15th and 16th (Service) Battalions, Royal Warwickshire Regiment). The brigade was initially numbered 116th Brigade in 39th Division, but in April 1915 the War Office decided to convert the K4 battalions into reserve units to train reinforcements for the K1–K3 units, and on 27 April the K5 divisions were renumbered to take up the designations of the K4 formations. The short-lived 39th Division thus became 32nd Division and 116th Brigade became 95th Brigade.

In May 1915, the brigade was to have gathered in Shropshire, but the ground selected at Prees Heath proved unsuitable for brigade training and on 23 June the 12th Gloucesters left Bristol to join 95th Brigade at Wensley, North Yorkshire. The two reserve or depot companies joined those of the Birmingham Pals at Sutton Coldfield to continue training. Brigade training started in earnest at Wensley, and 12th Gloucesters was finally adopted by the War Office on 23 June 1915. Previously, most of the shooting had been on miniature ranges with .22 ammunition; now the men began weekly musketry courses (12th Gloucesters at Whitburn, County Durham) although many of the rifles were worn and defective. In August, 32 Division gathered on Salisbury Plain to begin final battle training, with 12th Gloucesters in camp at Codford.

The battalion's strength at this time was about 1550, or more than 50 per cent over establishment; during August a large number of skilled men were transferred to other arms, others went to officer cadet training units, and older or unfit men were sent to the 15th (Reserve) Battalion at Sutton Coldfield into which the depot companies had been absorbed. Now that the battalion was almost ready to go overseas, the 59-year-old Lt-Col Burges was ordered to remain in the UK. He was succeeded in command by Lt-Col Martin Archer-Shee, a former Regular Army officer who was now Member of Parliament for Finsbury Central.

== Service ==
On 11 November 1915, 32nd Division was ordered to join the British Expeditionary Force on the Western Front and 12th Gloucesters landed at Boulogne on 21 November. By 28 November the division had concentrated round Ailly-le-Haut-Clocher, north of the River Somme. For its initiation into trench warfare with experienced units of 5th Division, 12th Gloucesters moved into a section of trenches thick with mud at Maricourt on 6 December. A Company was with 1st Bn East Surrey Regiment for instruction, and B Company with 2nd Bn Royal Inniskilling Fusiliers. 95th Brigade was exchanged with a brigade from 5th Division on 26 December as part of a policy to even-up experience levels between formations. The Pals battalions were scattered among 5th Division's brigades; although 12th Gloucesters remained with 95th Brigade, it was now brigaded with three Regular Army battalions that had been fighting since the beginning of the war.

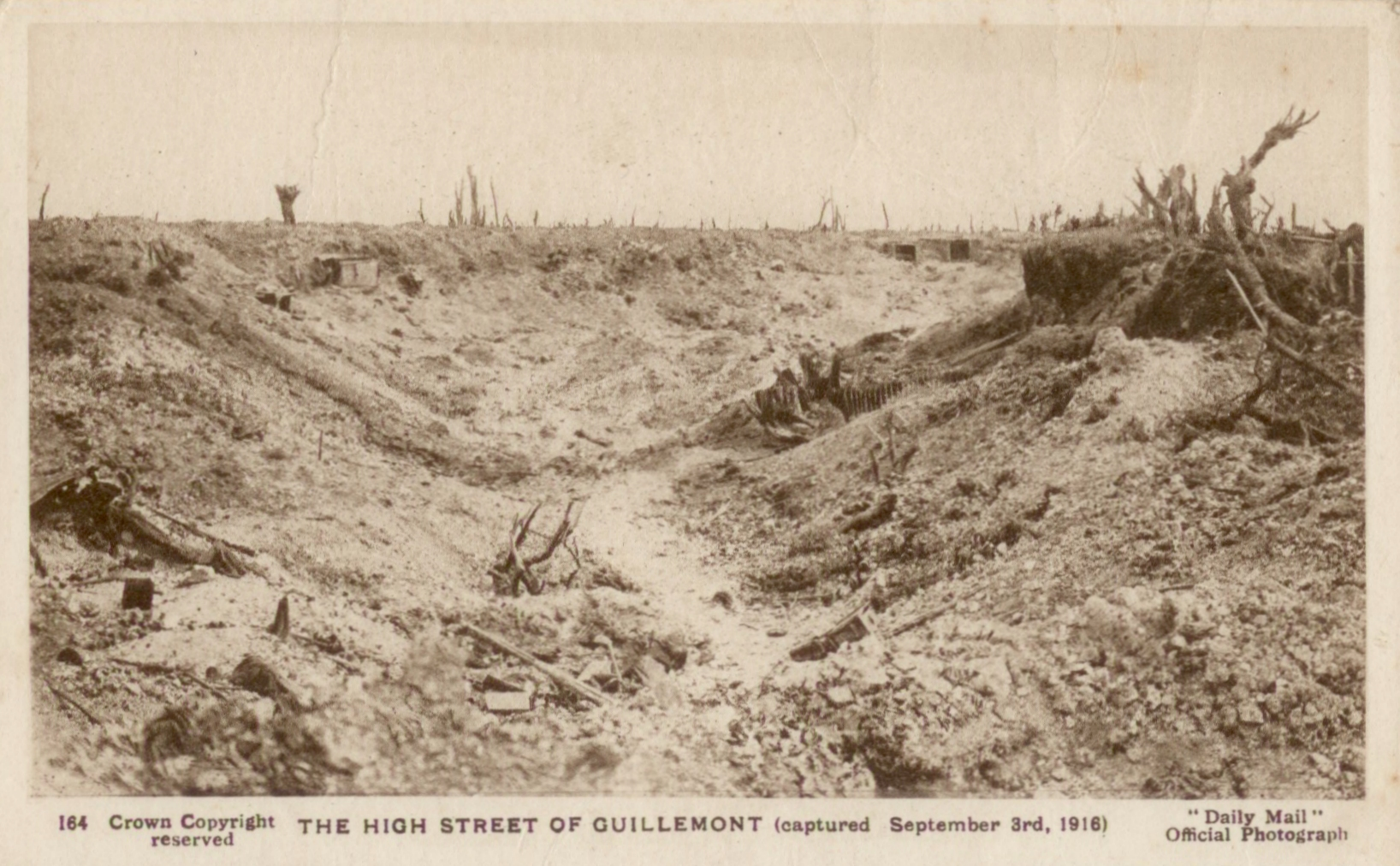
The high street of Guillemont, captured on 3 September

=== Somme ===
5th Division moved to the Arras sector in mid-February 1916, and 12th Gloucesters took over dry, well-made trenches with deep dug-outs, and lived in cellars in Arras when out of the line. Steel helmets began to be issued to British troops early in 1916, but there were great shortages: Lt-Col Archer-Shee used his position as an MP and own observations in the trenches to ask embarrassing questions of the Under-Secretary of State for War.

The battalion's first real taste of offensive warfare came during the Battle of the Somme. The offensive had begun on 1 July, and 5th Division took over part of the line in the Delville Wood sector near Longueval between 18 and 20 July, where 95th Brigade was to deal with German strongpoints in the orchards. When the commander of 95th Brigade, Brigadier-General C.R. Ballard, was wounded on 20 July, Lt-Col Archer-Shee took temporary command until Brig-Gen Lord Esme Gordon-Lennox arrived to take over. From 23 to 26 July the battalion was in the front line and was heavily shelled, with high explosive, shrapnel and gas, suffering many casualties. It went back into Longueval on 28 July, when the line was advanced to 'Duke Street' without opposition, but shelling was heavier than ever. At 15.30 next day, 95th Brigade attacked to complete the capture of Longueval in support of the main attack (the Battle of Delville Wood). 12th Gloucesters put in two companies on the left of the brigade after a half-hour bombardment, and they successfully advanced the line some 500 yards (460 m) beyond Duke Street. The battalion held these positions until relieved next day.

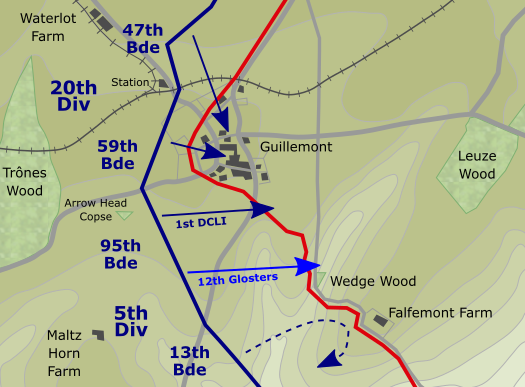
12th Bn Gloucesters' attack at Guillemont, 3 September 1916

The phase of the offensive that began on 22 July culminated in the Battle of Guillemont. The village of Guillemont had withstood repeated British attacks, but 5th Division made a new attempt on 3 September. The bombardment began at 08.30 and the attack began at 12.00, with the men advancing behind a creeping barrage (a recent innovation) moving at 50 yards (46 m) a minute; the men were instructed to keep within 25 yards (23 m) of the bursting shells. However, a flanking position at Falfemont Farm, which should have been captured in the morning, was still in enemy hands and threatened 95th Brigade's advance. The two leading companies of 12th Gloucesters took their first objective, a sunken lane, and found the dugouts beyond to be unoccupied. But then they came under enfilade fire from a machine gun off to the right in the Falfemont direction, which caused numerous casualties before A Company eliminated it. At 12.50 the battalion moved on to its second objective, the German line between Wedge Wood and the south of Guillemont village, which was taken without too much trouble. It then moved on at 14.50 to the third objective, a sunken lane running north from Wedge Wood towards Ginchy. Amidst the devastation of the battlefield C Company mistook Leuze Wood for Wedge Wood, got too far ahead and were caught by their own artillery fire. Although no enemy could be seen at Leuze Wood, the battalion was ordered to halt and consolidate its position rather than push into an awkward salient.

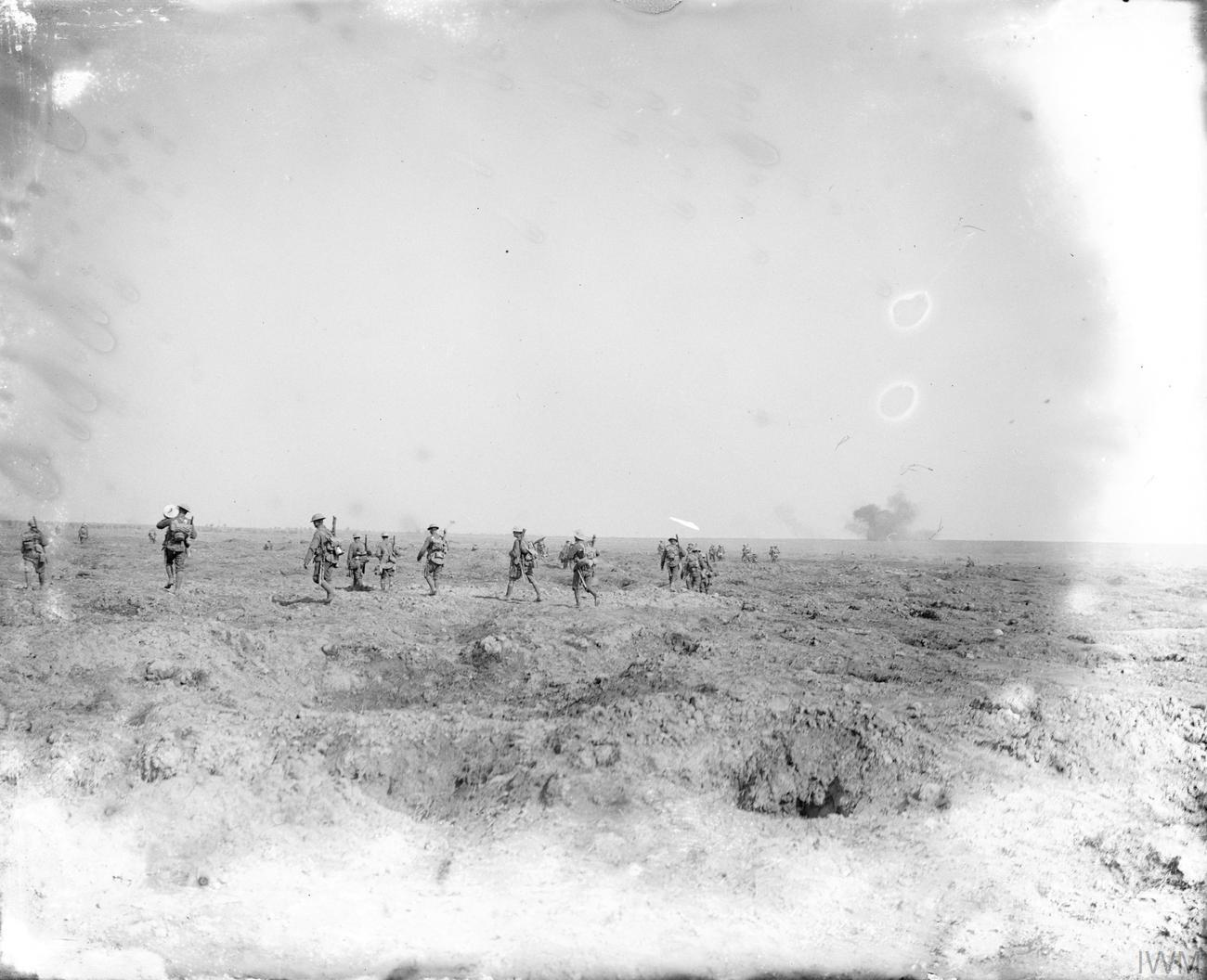
12th Gloucesters moving up in support near Ginchy, 25 September 1916

The 12th Gloucesters was now only 300 strong and took no active part in the Battle of Flers–Courcelette (18–22 September), though the battalion was later awarded it as a battle honour. Although the battalion had been told that it would not have to go back into the line, it received a draft of 116 reinforcements and was given a role in 95th Brigade's next attack, the Battle of Morval on 25 September. The battalion was in support while 1st Bn Devonshire Regiment and 1st Bn East Surreys suffered heavy casualties taking the first and second objectives. 12th Gloucesters and 2nd King's Own Scottish Borderers then moved through the village of Morval itself and dug in on the far side. The battalion's casualties were 12 killed and 61 wounded. The next night the battalion was relieved and went into camp in Happy Valley.

According to Lt-Col Archer-Shee, of the 950 members of 12th Gloucesters who entered the Battle of the Somme, 736 became casualties. After the end of the Somme offensive, the battalion continued to do duty in the appalling trenches in the area, alternating with tents in devastated Mametz Wood. 5th Division moved to the Béthune sector in October and spent the next six months in this quieter area. On 22 October Lt-Col Archer-Shee returned to the UK for treatment to an old wound and was succeeded on 20 November by Lt-Col Robert Rawson, a Regular officer of the Gloucesters who had commanded 6th Argyll and Sutherland Highlanders for two years. Rawson also acted as 95th Brigade's commander during the winter. Archer-Shee returned to the battalion in January 1917, but resigned his command on 10 February 1917 to devote himself to his parliamentary duties. Rawson returned from Brigade HQ on 18 March and took over full command.

=== Arras ===
12th Gloucesters was in reserve to the Canadian Corps for the Battle of Vimy Ridge on 9 April. Then on the night of 4/5 May, as the Arras Offensive continued, 95th Brigade relieved a Canadian brigade that had captured Fresnoy. Because of casualties, 12th Gloucesters was reduced to three companies, so it had two companies of 1st Duke of Cornwall's Light Infantry (DCLI) under its command in order to hold the wood north of the town. During 7 May the British trenches were heavily bombarded, then that night two successive attacks came in. 12th Gloucesters repulsed the first at 03.45 (which may have been an unplanned clash as the German storm troops moved into position) but the battalion was overwhelmed by the second attack at 05.45, which completely broke through the British lines and recaptured Fresnoy. Rawson sent up D Company DCLI and his own C Company to try to restore the situation, followed later by D Company 12th Gloucesters, but all they could do was hold a sunken lane behind the lost positions until relieved at 10.00. The battalion lost 389 casualties, including 94 dead; A and B Companies had completely disappeared, killed or captured, and there were no officers left in the frontline companies.

=== Ypres ===
Preserved trenches at Sanctuary Wood Museum Hill 62: when 12th Gloucesters were stationed here it was 'an unimaginably foul and miserable place'. There were no trees left and the battalion was sheltering in shell craters and dugouts.

The battered battalions were slowly built up to strength and trained hard, but 12th Gloucesters did not see major action again until the latter stages of the Third Ypres Offensive. 5th Division moved into X Corps' area on the night of 2/3 October during the Battle of Polygon Wood, then attacked on 4 October (the Battle of Broodseinde). Launched at 06.00, 95th Brigade advanced 500 yards (460 m) with the help of a tank to deal with German pillboxes. 12th Gloucesters had been in reserve to the attacking battalion, 1st East Surreys, and moved three companies up into the Surreys' forming-up trenches 40 minutes after Zero hour, where they suffered badly from the German counter-barrage. Later in the morning, C Company was sent up to help 1st Devons. The following day the battalion held the captured line, under continuing artillery fire. In preparation for the next attack (the Battle of Poelcappelle on 9 October), 12th Gloucesters was in Sanctuary Wood, where it was under observation and artillery fire from the enemy and movement was restricted to duckboard tracks. On 8 October the battalion was split, with two companies providing carrying parties and the other two in the support line behind 1st Bn Cheshire Regiment. When the attack was delivered, the companies in Sanctuary Wood provided carrying and burial parties, while the two in the support line were pinned by artillery and could not be relieved until 10/11 October. Despite not actually attacking itself, 12th Gloucesters lost 359 casualties (150 from gas), of whom 88 died, in the period 1–12 October.

While 5th Division continued to attack (the Second Battle of Passchendaele), 12th Gloucesters remained out of the line after Poelcapelle, resting, absorbing a few reinforcements, and training. It spent two short spells holding the line, suffering only light casualties, and then the whole division was pulled out. At the end of October Lt-Col Rawson left the battalion for a six-month tour of duty in the UK and the second-in-command, Maj H.A. Colt, was promoted to succeed him.

=== Italy ===
Following the Austro-German breakthrough at the Battle of Caporetto, the BEF was required to release divisions to reinforce the Italian Army. On 23 November, 5th Division was warned that it would be moved to the Italian Front. Entrainment began at Hesdin on 27 November, but after A and C Companies were got away, B and D were held back under orders to move at a moment's notice to the Cambrai sector, where the German counter-attack following the Battle of Cambrai threatened to break through. The fighting died down after 3 December, and the two companies were released. 5th Division completed its concentration to the east of the River Brenta, not far from Padua, by 20 December. When 5th Division took over part of the line along the River Piave on 27 January 1918, 12th Gloucesters relieved an Italian unit, and was ordered to wear Italian helmets to conceal the fact that British troops had taken over. The battalion carried out several fighting patrols against the opposing Hungarian units until 5th Division was relieved on 18 March.

=== Spring Offensive ===
The Germans began their Spring Offensive on the Western Front on 21 March and achieved rapid successes. On 24 March, 5th Division was warned that it would return to France. Entrainment began on 1 April; 12th Gloucesters started on 2 April, and the division completed its concentration between Doullens and Frévent on 9 April.

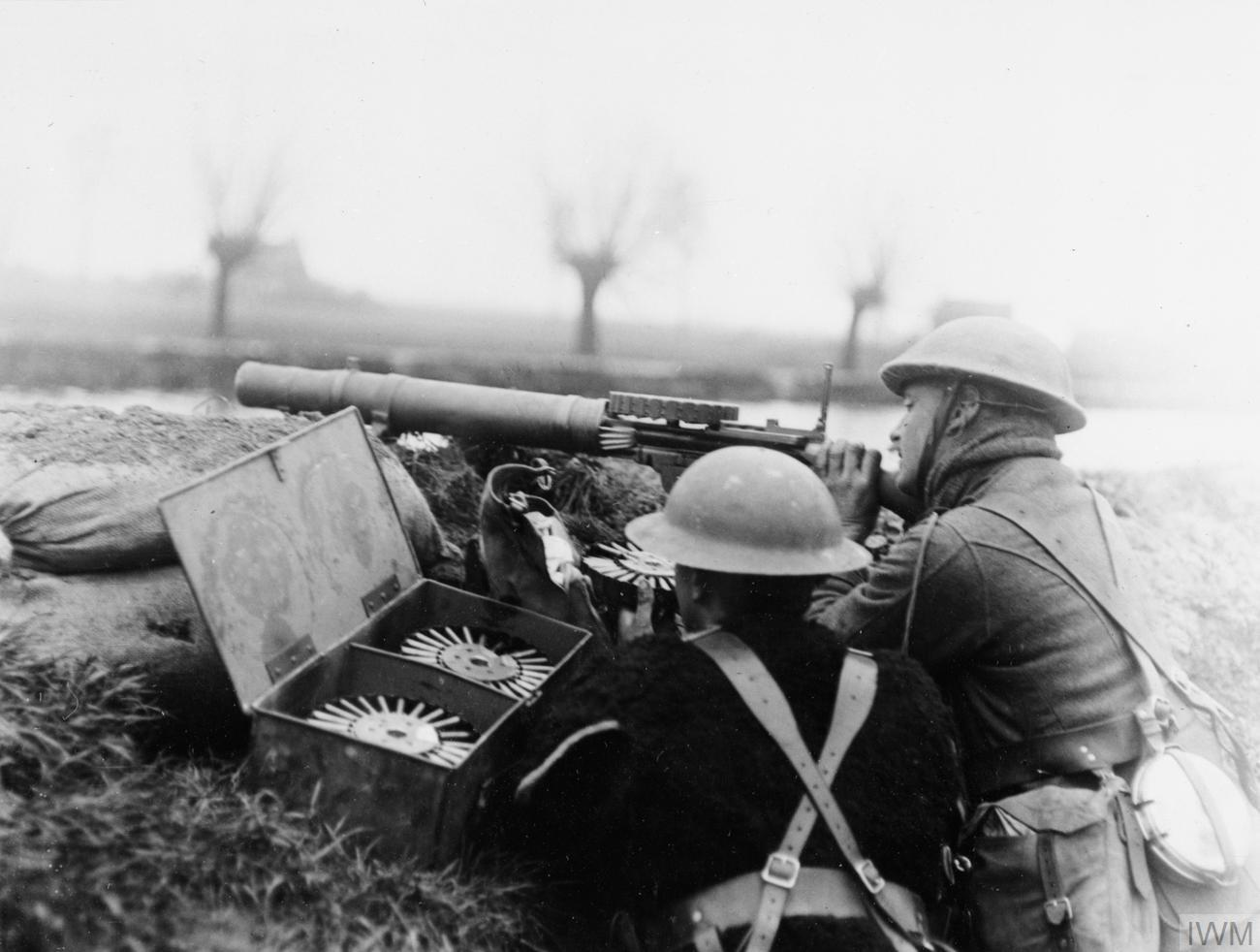
A British Lewis gun team at the Battle of Hazebrouck

The second phase of the Spring Offensive (Operation Georgette, or the Battle of the Lys) had opened on 7 April and 5th Division took up positions from the Lys Canal to the Forest of Nieppe, where it came under immediate attack (the Battle of Hazebrouck). On 13 April 12th Gloucesters held off one German attack for the loss of 76 casualties, including 18 killed. By 15 April, the battalion was well dug in and held off another attack. The battalion was out of the line from 16 to 21 April, and then carried out an attack of its own on 22 April. Close behind a creeping barrage, it captured Le Vert Bois Farm (later renamed 'Gloucester Farm') without serious opposition, but it took all day to take Le Vert Bois itself. The battalion captured three German machine guns and 39 prisoners. The Germans abandoned Operation Georgette a few days later.

On 28 June, the British launched a limited operation to improve their positions along the edge of the Nieppe Forest. 12th Gloucesters was tasked with capturing Le Cornet Perdu, moving up in darkness to attack at 06.00. It took all its objectives by 09.30, and pushed patrols up to the Plate Becq river, though a handful of German machine guns had caused 164 casualties, of whom 45 died.

=== Hundred Days Offensive ===
The Allies launched their own Hundred Days Offensive on 8 August 1918, when 5th Division was in reserve. It then came into action at the Third Battle of Albert on 21 August. This was a three-phase attack, with 5th Division passing through 37th Division for the second phase. 95th Brigade led, with 12th Gloucesters as its reserve. Once the second objective had been taken, 12th Gloucesters took over and, despite having lost the barrage, advanced over a mile of open country with some of 1st East Surreys and just reached the Arras–Albert railway before meeting stronger opposition. Mist now hampered the artillery and tanks, and the battalion was unable to push beyond the railway to the final objective. It had lost an officer and 11 other ranks killed, and nearly 100 wounded. Next day the battalion consolidated, then drove off a German counter-attack at 17.30, capturing 180 prisoners and five machine guns in the process. On 23 August, reinforced by two companies of 1st DCLI, the battalion launched an attack at 11.00 behind a creeping barrage to capture the railway line. The Germans had numerous machine gun nests along it and caused numerous casualties before they were overrun. Having lost the barrage, the battalion was unable to advance beyond the ridge to Irles, and requested reinforcements. Before they arrived, the neighbouring brigade attacked, so Lt-Col Colt led a charge by the remainder of 12th Gloucesters and the DCLI companies to capture the village, though losses were heavy: 30 men were killed and nine officers and 170 men wounded, including Lt-Col Colt (who was awarded the DSO). The previous CO, Lt-Col Rawson, returned to command the battalion.

The weakened battalion was withdrawn into reserve while the rest of 95th Brigade attacked on 30 August (the Battle of the Scarpe) and then took over holding part of the front line. 95th Brigade was relieved on 4 September after the conclusion of the Second Battle of Bapaume. Part of 5th Division went into action at the Battle of Épehy on 18 September, and 12th Gloucesters later received the battle honour despite not being engaged.

All the Allied armies began a rolling offensive all the way along the Western Front on 26 September. The BEF's Third Army stormed across the Canal du Nord on 27 September, and next morning 5th Division launched a follow-up attack. Because the designated assault brigade (13th Brigade) had suffered heavy casualties, 95th Brigade was substituted for it at short notice and only just got to the jumping-off position in time for Zero hour at 02.40. It ran into considerable opposition and 12th Gloucesters found both its flanks were open; 1st DCLI came up on the left later, but the right remained exposed and isolated German machine gun posts had to be dealt with using rifle grenades. It was not until 08.00 that the first village was taken. The brigade then had to resort to trench warfare methods to work its way up to the second objective on the slopes of Welsh Ridge by evening. 95th Brigade was also hung up when it attacked again next day, finding the pace of the creeping barrage too fast over broken ground. By the time it was relieved on 30 September 12th Gloucesters' casualties amounted to 52, 24 of them fatal, though it had taken about 120 prisoners.

== Disbandment ==
While 5th Division had been in Italy, the BEF's manpower shortage led to infantry brigades being reduced from four to three battalions. 5th Division's brigades had retained the four-battalion establishment, but by late 1918 the shortage of manpower was critical, and the division had to fall in line. As the only New Army battalion in 95th Brigade, 12th Gloucesters was ordered to disband and the remaining men were drafted to other units. 12th (Service) Battalion, Gloucestershire Regiment, (Bristol's Own) commenced disbandment on 19 October 1918 while the Battle of the Selle was raging. Most of D Company was posted to 14th Warwicks, which became the divisional pioneer battalion. Others went to 1st Devons and 1st DCLI. The war ended less than a month later when the Armistice with Germany came into effect.

During its service the battalion had suffered losses of 32 officers and 754 other ranks killed. Of the original 990 men who landed in France in November 1915, 205 had died with the battalion, and over 100 more after being posted to other units.

== 15th (Reserve) Battalion, Gloucestershire Regiment ==
15th (Reserve) Battalion was formed at Sutton Coldfield on 31 August 1915 from the depot companies of the 12th (Bristol's Own) and 14th (West of England) Battalions of the Gloucesters. The 14th (Service) Battalion was a 'Bantam' battalion that had been raised by the Bristol Citizens' Recruiting Committee on 22 April 1915. The 15th Battalion moved to Chiseldon Camp in Wiltshire and joined 22nd Reserve Brigade. The CO from 10 August 1915 to 31 August 1916 was Lt-Col Stephen Willcock. On 1 September 1916 the Local Reserve battalions were transferred to the Training Reserve (TR) and the battalion was redesignated 93rd Training Reserve Battalion in 22nd Reserve Bde. On 4 July 1917 it was redesignated 262nd (Infantry) Battalion, TR. When the Training Reserve was reorganised in late 1917, the battalion transferred to the Royal Warwickshire Regiment as 51st (Graduated) Battalion. After the war it was converted into a service battalion on 8 February 1918 and sent to the British Army of the Rhine. It was finally disbanded in Germany on 12 February 1920.

== Commanding officers ==
The following commanded the battalion during its service:

- Lt-Col William Burges from 1 September 1914 to 12 August 1915
- Lt-Col Martin Archer-Shee from 12 August 1915 to 22 October 1916
- Maj W. A. R. Blennerhassett acting from 22 October to 20 November 1916
- Lt-Col Robert Rawson from 20 November 1916 to 25 October 1917
- Lt-Col Henry Colt from 25 October 1917, wounded 24 August 1918
- Lt-Col Robert Rawson returned 24 August, promoted Brigadier-General 1 September 1918
- Lt-Col Henry Colt returned 1 September 1918 until disbandment

== Insignia ==
Before uniforms were available, the recruits of the Bristol Battalion wore a special badge on their civilian clothing. Once service caps were available the battalion adopted the Glosters' famous 'back badge'. Between 21 November 1915 and 26 March 1916, all ranks of the battalion wore a horizontal strip of ribbon, purple-over-yellow-over-purple, on the back beneath the collar. 5th Division's formation sign was a blue square with a yellow diagonal bar from top left to bottom right. The division did not wear unit identification patches, but used markings painted on the steel helmet: during 1918, 12th Glosters wore a black circle.

== Memorials ==
In 1921 Lt-Col Archer-Shee, the 12th Glosters' former CO, paid for a memorial to be erected at Longueval on the Somme, where the battalion had first attacked on 29 July 1916. The memorial, in the form of an oak cross known as 'Gloster Cross', disappeared during World War II, but was replaced in 1986 and restored in 2006.

In 1951 the Bristol's Own Old Comrades Association unveiled a bronze memorial plaque in the crypt of St Nicholas Church, Bristol.

== Battle honours ==
12th Battalion Gloucestershire Regiment was awarded 22 battle honours for its service:

- Somme 1916, 1918
- Delville Wood
- Guillemont
- Flers-Courcelette
- Morval
- Arras 1917, 1918
- Vimy 1917
- Scarpe 1917
- Ypres 1917
- Polygon Wood
- Broodseinde
- Poelcapelle
- Passchendaele
- Albert 1918
- Bapaume 1918
- Lys
- Hazebrouck
- Hindenburg Line
- Épehy
- Canal du Nord
- France & Flanders 1915–18
- Italy 1917–18

== See also ==
- List of pals battalions
