= Irles =

- Commune
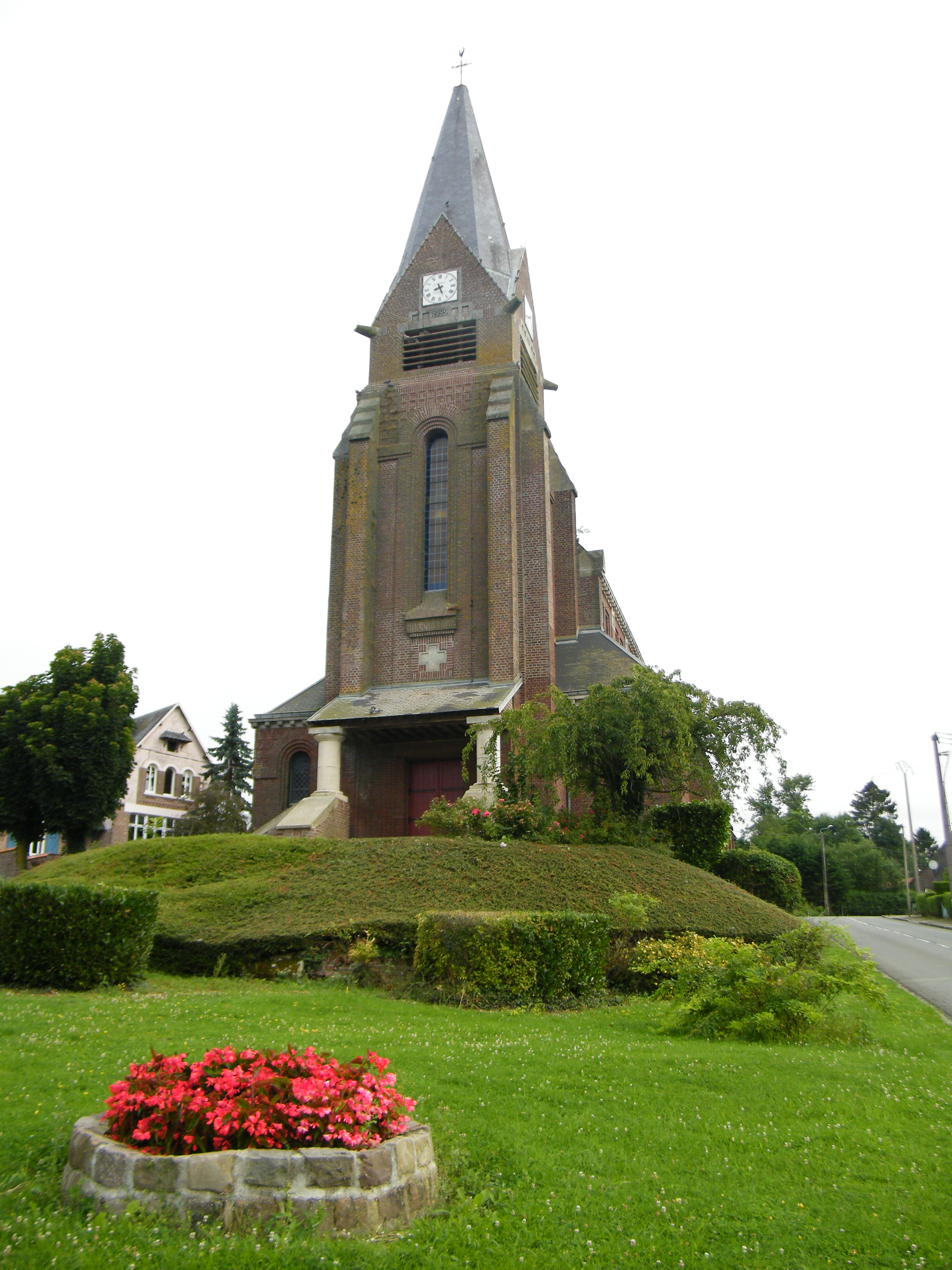
- The church in Irles
- Location of Irles
- Location within France Location within Hauts-de-France
- Coordinates: 50°06′01″N 2°45′16″E
- Country: France
- Region: Hauts-de-France
- Department: Somme
- Arrondissement: Péronne
- Canton: Albert
- Intercommunality: Pays du Coquelicot

Government
  - Mayor (2020–2026): Régis Philippe
- Area^{1}: 5.38 km^{2} (2.08 sq mi)
- Elevation: 101 m (331 ft)
- Highest elevation: 132 m (433 ft)
- Lowest elevation: 82 m (269 ft)
- Population (2023): 111
  - Density: 20.6/km^{2} (53.4/sq mi)
- Time zone: UTC+01:00 (CET)
  - Summer (DST): UTC+02:00 (CEST)
- INSEE/Postal code: 80451 /80300
- ^{1} French Land Register data, which excludes lakes, ponds, glaciers > 1 km^{2} (0.386 sq mi or 247 acres) and river estuaries.

Irles (French pronunciation: [iʁl]) is a commune in the Somme department in Hauts-de-France in northern France.

== Geography ==
Irles is situated on the D163 road, some 10 miles (16 km) south of Arras, near the border with the département of the Pas-de-Calais.

== History ==
Irles was the site of an action by the 1st Royal West Kent Regiment and the 12th Gloucestershire Regiment on 23 August 1918 during the Second Battle of Bapaume.

== Population ==
Historical population
Year	Pop.	±% p.a.
1968	135	—
1975	129	−0.65%
1982	120	−1.03%
1990	113	−0.75%
1999	104	−0.92%
2007	115	+1.26%
2012	108	−1.25%
2017	113	+0.91%
2023	111	−0.30%
Source: INSEE

== See also ==
- Communes of the Somme department
