= 96th Brigade (United Kingdom) =

Military unit

The 96th Brigade was a formation of the British Army during the First World War. It was raised as part of the new army also known as Kitchener's Army and assigned to the 32nd Division. The brigade served on the Western Front.

== Formation ==
The infantry battalions did not all serve at once, but all were assigned to the brigade during the war.

- 16th Battalion, Northumberland Fusiliers (Newcastle)
- 17th Battalion, Northumberland Fusiliers (NER Pioneers)
- 15th Battalion, Lancashire Fusiliers (1st Salford)
- 16th Battalion, Lancashire Fusiliers (2nd Salford)
- 19th Battalion, Lancashire Fusiliers (3rd Salford)
- 2nd Battalion, Royal Inniskilling Fusiliers
- 2nd Battalion, Manchester Regiment
- 96th Machine Gun Company
- 96th Trench Mortar Battery
