= 32nd Division (United Kingdom) =

Infantry division of the British Army during the First World War

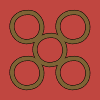
- Active: 1915–1919
- Country: United Kingdom
- Branch: British Army
- Type: Infantry
- Size: Division
- Engagements: Battle of the Somme Pursuit to the Hindenburg Line Defence of Nieuport German spring offensive Allied Hundred Days Offensive

Commanders
- Notable commanders: Maj-Gen Reginald Barnes; Maj-Gen Cameron Shute

The 32nd Division was an infantry division of the British Army that was raised in 1914, during the First World War.

== Formation history ==
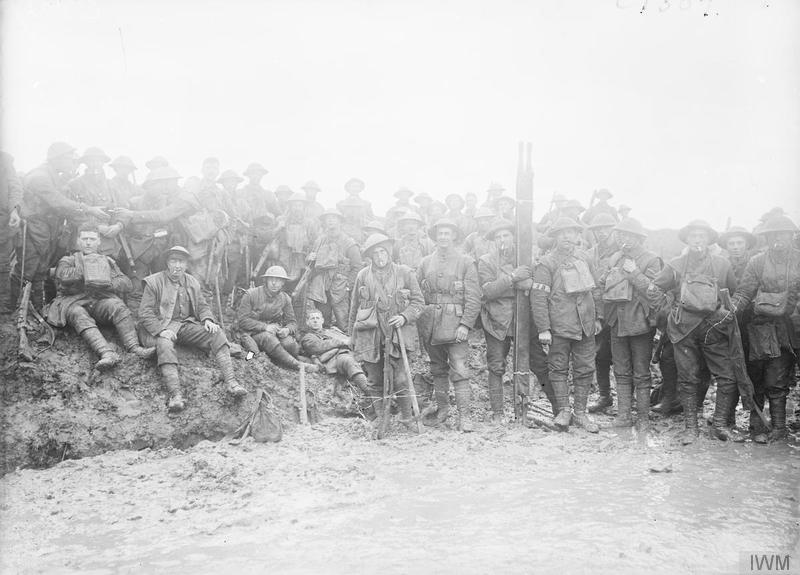
Group of tommies of the 2nd Battalion, Manchester Regiment, after the advance on the Ancre, possibly around Serre, January 1917.

The 32nd Division was one of those created for Kitchener's Fifth New Army ('K5') on 10 December 1914 and was originally numbered 38th until the six K4 divisions were converted into reserve units.

It landed in France in November 1915, under the command of Major General William Henry Rycroft. Major-General Reginald Barnes, replacing the sacked Rycroft, took command of the division for a short while in November 1916 before being replaced by the controversial Major-General Cameron Shute.

The division was raised from volunteers for Lord Kitchener's New Armies, made up of infantry 'Pals battalions' and artillery brigades raised by public subscription or private patronage. The division was taken over by the War Office in September 1915. It served in France and Belgium in the trenches of the Western Front for the duration of the war. It saw action at the Battle of the Somme, the Pursuit to the Hindenburg Line, the Defence of Nieuport, the German spring offensive, and the Allied Hundred Days Offensive beginning at the Battle of Amiens.

== Order of Battle ==
The following units and formations served with the division during the war:

Brigadier-General Frederick Lumsden, VC, killed in action 4 June 1918 while in command of 14th Brigade; posthumous portrait by H. Donald Smith.

14th Brigade

The brigade joined from the 5th Division in December 1915, swapping with the 95th Brigade.

- 1/9th Territorial Force (T.F.) Battalion Royal Scots (left January 1916)
- 1st Battalion, Devonshire Regiment (left January 1916)
- 1st Battalion, East Surrey Regiment (left January 1916)
- 1st Battalion Duke of Cornwall's Light Infantry (left January 1916)
- 2nd Battalion, Manchester Regiment (joined December 1915 transferred to 96th Brigade February 1918)
- 1st Battalion, Dorset Regiment (joined 7 January 1916)
- 19th (Service) Battalion (3rd Salford), Lancashire Fusiliers (transferred from 96th Brigade January 1916 left July 1916)
- 15th (Service) Battalion (1st Glasgow), Highland Light Infantry (transferred from 97th Brigade January 1916)
- 5th/6th Battalion, Royal Scots T.F. (joined 29 July 1916)
- 4th Machine Gun Company (joined February 1916, moved to 32nd Battalion Machine Gun Corps (M.G.C.) 21 February 1918)
- 14th Trench Mortar Battery (joined March 1916)

95th Brigade

The brigade transferred to the 5th Division on 26 December 1915, swapping with the 14th Brigade.

- 14th (Service) Battalion, Royal Warwickshire Regiment (1st Birmingham)
- 15th (Service) Battalion, Royal Warwickshire Regiment (2nd Birmingham)
- 16th (Service) Battalion, Royal Warwickshire Regiment (3rd Birmingham)
- 12th (Service) Battalion, Gloucestershire Regiment (Bristol's Own)

96th Brigade

- 16th (Service) Battalion, (Newcastle), Northumberland Fusiliers (disbanded February 1918)
- 15th (Service) Battalion (1st Salford), Lancashire Fusiliers
- 16th (Service) Battalion (2nd Salford), Lancashire Fusiliers
- 19th (Service) Battalion (3rd Salford), Lancashire Fusiliers (transferred to 14th Brigade 5 January 1916)
- 2nd Battalion, Royal Inniskilling Fusiliers (joined January 1916 left February 1918)
- 2nd Battalion, Manchester Regiment (transferred from 14th Brigade February 1918)
- 96th Machine Gun Company (joined 15 March 1916, moved to 32nd Battalion M.G.C. 21 February 1918)
- 96th Trench Mortar Battery (joined March 1916)

97th Brigade

- 11th (Service) Battalion (Lonsdale), Border Regiment (left May 1918)
- 15th (Service) Battalion (1st Glasgow), Highland Light Infantry (transferred to 14th Brigade January 1916)
- 16th (Service) Battalion (2nd Glasgow), Highland Light Infantry (transferred to Divisional Pioneers February 1918)
- 17th (Service) Battalion (3rd Glasgow), Highland Light Infantry (disbanded February 1918)
- 2nd Battalion, King's Own Yorkshire Light Infantry (joined December 1915)
- 10th (Service) Battalion, Argyll and Sutherland Highlanders (joined February 1918)
- 1/5th (Cumberland) Battalion, Border Regiment (joined May 1918)
- 97th Machine Gun Company (joined 15 March 1916, moved to 32nd Battalion M.G.C. 21 February 1918)
- 97th Trench Mortar Battery (joined March 1916)

Mounted Troops

- F Sqn, North Irish Horse (joined April left June 1916)
- 32nd Divisional Cyclist Company, Army Cyclist Corps (left 31 May 1916)

Pioneers

- 17th (Service) Battalion (North Eastern Railway Pioneers), Northumberland Fusiliers (joined as Divisional Pioneer Battalion June 1915, left October 1916, returned September 1917, finally left November 1917 )
- 1/12th T.F. Battalion, Loyal North Lancashire Regiment (joined as Divisional Pioneer Battalion November 1916, left January 1917)
- 16th (Service) Battalion (Glasgow Boys Brigade), Highland Light Infantry (joined as Divisional Pioneer Battalion February 1918)

Machine Gun Corps

- 219th Machine Gun Company (joined 25 March 1917, moved to 32nd Battalion M.G.C. 21 February 1918)
- 32nd Battalion M.G.C. (formed 21 February 1918 absorbing brigade MG companies)

Royal Artillery

2nd County Palatine Artillery Originally raised in Lancashire for 32nd Division by the Earl of Derby but did not accompany the division to France in November 1915. Later joined 31st Division.

- CLXV (2nd County Palatine) Brigade, Royal Field Artillery (RFA)
- CLXIX (2nd County Palatine) Brigade, RFA
- CLXX (2nd County Palatine) Brigade, RFA
- CLXXI (2nd County Palatine) Howitzer Brigade, RFA
- 133rd (2nd County Palatine) Heavy Battery and Ammunition Column, Royal Garrison Artillery
- 30th (2nd County Palatine) Divisional Ammunition Column, RFA

53rd (Welsh) Divisional Artillery Attached to 32nd Division in France between 22 November and 27 December 1915, later rejoining 53rd (Welsh) Division in Egypt

- I Welsh (Howitzer) Brigade, RFA
- II Welsh Brigade, RFA
- Cheshire Brigade, RFA
- IV Welsh Brigade, RFA
- 53rd (Welsh) Divisional Ammunition Column, RFA

32nd Divisional Artillery Transferred from 31st Division, joining in France between 30 December 1915 and 3 January 1916

- CLV (West Yorkshire) Brigade, RFA (left 20 January 1917)
- CVXI (Yorkshire) Brigade, RFA
- CLXIV (Rotherham) Howitzer Brigade, RFA (broken up September 1916)
- CLXVIII (Huddersfield) Brigade, RFA
- 32nd (Hull) Divisional Ammunition Column, RFA
- 32nd Divisional Trench Mortar Brigade
  - 32nd (Hull) Heavy Trench Mortar Battery (formed in April 1916 from Divisional Ammunition Column, later redesignated V.32; became X.32 Medium Battery 12 February 1918)
  - W.32 Heavy Trench Mortar Battery, R.F.A. (temporarily formed for Battle of the Somme; broken up 28 December 1916)
  - A.32, B.32 Medium Trench Mortar Batteries (temporarily formed for Battle of the Somme)
  - X.32, Y.32 and Z.32 Medium Mortar Batteries, R.F.A. (formed May 1916; X and Z broken up 12 February 1918 and distributed among New X and Y batteries)

Royal Engineers

- 206th (Glasgow) Field Company
- 218th (Glasgow) Field Company
- 219th (Glasgow) Field Company
- 32nd Divisional Signals Company

Royal Army Medical Corps

- 96th Field Ambulance (left November 1915)
- 97th Field Ambulance (left November 1915)
- 98th Field Ambulance (left November 1915)
- 90th Field Ambulance (joined November 1915)
- 91st Field Ambulance (joined November 1915)
- 92nd Field Ambulance (joined November 1915)
- 72nd Sanitary Section (left 17 April 1917)

Army Service Corps

- 32nd Divisional Train Army Service Corps (A.S.C.)
  - 221st, 222nd, 223rd and 224th Companies A.S.C. (remained in England in November 1915)
  - 202nd, 203rd, 204th and 205th Companies A.S.C. (joined in France)
- 42nd Mobile Veterinary Section Army Veterinary Corps
- 229th Divisional Employment Company (joined 25 March 1917)

== Service ==
The division was engaged in the following major actions:

=== 1916 ===
- Battle of the Somme
  - Battle of Albert, 1–3 July
  - Battle of Bazentin Ridge, 14–15 July
  - Battle of the Ancre Heights (32nd Divisional Artillery only), 23 October–11 November
  - Battle of the Ancre, 17–19 November

=== 1917 ===
- Operations on the Ancre, 11 January–15 February
  - Capture of Ten Tree Trench (97th Bde only), 10 February
- German retreat to the Hindenburg Line, 14 March–14 April
  - Capture of Holnon Wood, 1 April
  - Capture of Fayet (14th and 97th Bdes), 14 April
- Battle of Messines (32nd Divisional Artillery only), 7 June
- Operations on the Flanders Coast, 20 June–7 October
  - Defence of Nieuport, 10–11 July

=== 1918 ===
- German spring offensive
  - Battle of Arras (97th Bde only), 28 March
  - Capture of Ayette (14th and 96th Bdes), 3 April
  - Battle of the Ancre, 5 April
- Hundred Days Offensive
  - Battle of Amiens, 10–11 August
  - Second Battle of the Somme
    - Battle of Albert, 21–23 August
    - Second Battle of Bapaume, 31 August–3 September
  - Battles of the Hindenburg Line
    - Battle of the St Quentin Canal, 29 September–3 October
    - Battle of the Beaurevoir Line, 3–4 October
  - Battle of the Selle (32nd Divisional Artillery only), 17–25 October
  - Battle of the Sambre
    - Attack on the Happegarbes Spur (96th Bde only), 2 November
    - Crossing of the Sambre–Oise Canal, 4 November

=== Postwar ===
32nd Division was occupying Avesnes when the Armistice with Germany came into effect on 11 November. Two days later it was informed that it would take part in the advance to the Rhine, which began on 19 November. However, the division was halted on the Meuse between Dinant and Namur, to act as reserve for the British Army of the Rhine (BAOR). On 28 January 1919 the division began entraining for Bonn and on 3 February it took over the southern sector of the Cologne bridgehead while demobilisation of individuals continued. On 15 March the division was renamed the Lancashire Division in BAOR, and war-raised units were progressively replaced by Regulars during 1919. During the war the division lost 34,226 killed, wounded and missing.

Maj-Gen (later Gen Sir) Cameron Shute.

== General Officers commanding ==
The following served as General Officer Commanding (GOC) of the division during the war:

- Maj-Gen William Henry Rycroft, 29 June 1915 to 22 November 1916
- Maj-Gen Reginald Barnes, 22 November 1916; sick 9–16 and 29 January 1917
- Brig-Gen James Tyler, Commander Royal Artillery (CRA), acting 9–16 January and 29 January–19 February 1917
- Maj-Gen Cameron Shute, 19 February to 24 May 1917 and 20 June 1917 to 27 April 1918
- Maj-Gen Hon. Richard Montagu-Stuart-Wortley, temporary 24 May to 20 June 1917
- Brig-Gen James Tyler, CRA, acting 27 April 1918
- Maj-Gen J. Campbell, 27 April to 6 May 1918
- Brig-Gen Frederick Lumsden, VC, GOC 14th Bde, acting 6 May 1918
- Maj-Gen R.J. Bridgford, 7 to 31 May 1918
- Maj-Gen Thomas Stanton Lambert, 31 May 1918 to 1919

== See also ==
- List of British divisions in World War I
