= 95th Brigade (United Kingdom) =

Military unit

The 95th Brigade was an infantry brigade formation of the British Army, created during World War I. It was raised from men volunteering for Lord Kitchener's New Armies and assigned to the 32nd Division. The brigade, initially composed of three service battalions (the 14th, 15th and 16th, the Birmingham Pals) of the Royal Warwickshire Regiment and one (the 12th, Bristol's Own) of the Gloucestershire Regiment, was sent to the Western Front in November 1915, where it was to serve for most of the war, and later briefly on the Italian Front in late 1917 before returning to the Western Front in April 1918. In December 1915, the brigade was transferred to the 5th Division, a Regular Army formation, and all three battalions of the Royal Warwickshire Regiment were exchanged for three Regular Army battalions, and was to remain with this composition for the rest of the war.

== Order of battle ==
The 95th Brigade was composed as follows during the war:

- 14th (Service) Battalion, Royal Warwickshire Regiment (1st Birmingham) (left 28 December 1915)
- 15th (Service) Battalion, Royal Warwickshire Regiment (2nd Birmingham) (left 28 December 1915)
- 16th (Service) Battalion, Royal Warwickshire Regiment (3rd Birmingham) (left 26 December 1915)
- 12th (Service) Battalion, Gloucestershire Regiment (Bristol's Own) (disbanded October 1918)
- 1st Battalion, Devonshire Regiment (from 12 January 1916)
- 1st Battalion, East Surrey Regiment (from 12 January 1916)
- 1st Battalion, Duke of Cornwall's Light Infantry (from 12 January 1916)
- 95th Machine Gun Company, Machine Gun Corps (formed 20 December 1915 as 14th Machine Gun Company, moved to 5th Battalion, Machine Gun Corps 26 April 1918)
- 95th Trench Mortar Battery (formed April 1916)
