= Birmingham Pals =

Battalions of the Royal Warwickshire Regiment of the British Army

The Birmingham Pals were the three infantry battalions of the Royal Warwickshire Regiment of the British Army raised from men volunteering in the city of Birmingham in September 1914, shortly after the outbreak of the Great War. They consisted of men volunteering for Kitchener's New Armies and the battalions became, respectively, the 14th, 15th and 16th (Service) battalions of the Royal Warwickshire Regiment. A further battalion, 17th, was formed in June 1915 as a reserve battalion, and was reorganised in the Training Reserve in September 1916 as 92nd Training Reserve Battalion.

== Badges ==
The cap badge of the Birmingham Pals was that of the Royal Warwickshire Regiment, with an additional scroll beneath the regimental title bearing the additional title 1st, 2nd or 3rd Birmingham Battalion. It is unlikely that the 17th Battalion had a discrete cap-badge.

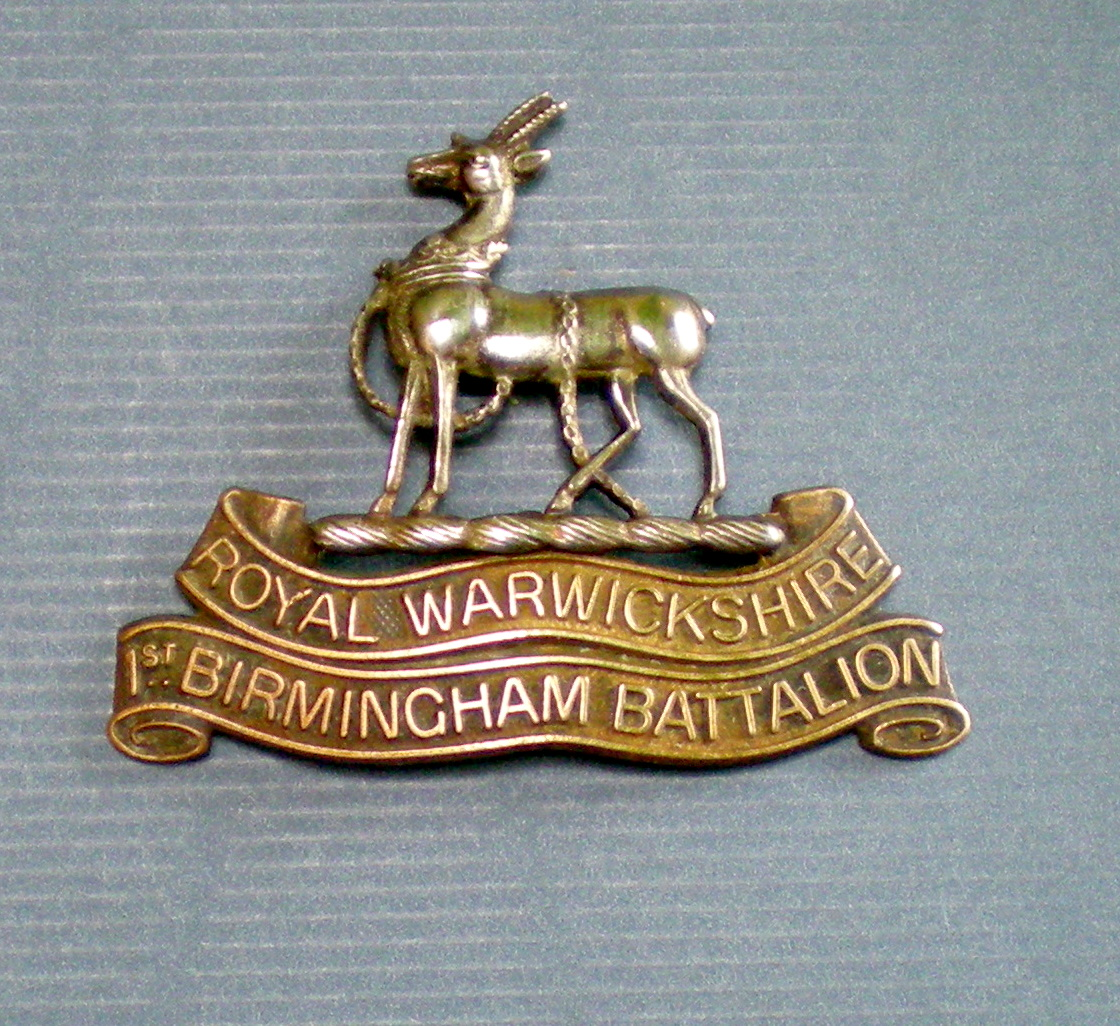
Cap badge, 14th (Service)(1st Birmingham) Bn Royal Warwickshire Regiment, 1914 - 1919. Note - this is not an original.

Cap badge, 15th (Service)(2nd Birmingham) Bn Royal Warwickshire Regiment, 1914 - 1919. Note - this is not an original.

Cap badge, 16th (Service)(3rd Birmingham) Bn Royal Warwickshire Regiment, 1914 - 1919. Note - this is not an original.

== Field service ==
The three City of Birmingham battalions were all deployed to the Western Front in France on 21 November 1915. The 14th (Service) Battalion (1st Birmingham) formed part of 95th Brigade, 32nd Division, though on 28 December 1915 it was transferred to 13th Brigade, 5th Division. The battalion was moved to the Italian Front with the rest of the 5th Division in November 1917, but returned to the Western Front to take part in the defence against the major German offensives of April 1918. On 5 October 1918 it became the Pioneer Battalion of the 5th Division.

The 15th (Service) Battalion (2nd Birmingham) was also attached to 95th Brigade, 32nd Division, though on 28 December 1915 it was transferred to 14th Brigade of the 5th Division. It was again transferred, to 13th Brigade, 5th Division, on 14 January 1916, and moved to Italy with the 5th Division in November 1917. It too was returned to France April 1918. On 6 October 1918 the 15th (Service) Battalion was disbanded, with personnel being posted to the 14th and 16th battalions.

The 16th (Service) Battalion (3rd Birmingham) was also attached at first to 95th Brigade, 32nd Division. On 26 December 1915 it was transferred to 15th Brigade, 5th Division, and went to Italy with the Division in November 1917. Like the 14th and 15th battalions, the 16th was returned to France April 1918. On 4 October 1918 it was transferred to 13th Brigade, 5th Division.

The 17th (Reserve) Battalion was formed in Sutton Coldfield in June 1915 as a Reserve battalion, from depot companies of the City of Birmingham battalions. On 1 September 1916 it was converted into 92nd Training Reserve Battalion in 22nd Reserve Brigade.
