= Hull Pals =

British military unit (1914–1919)

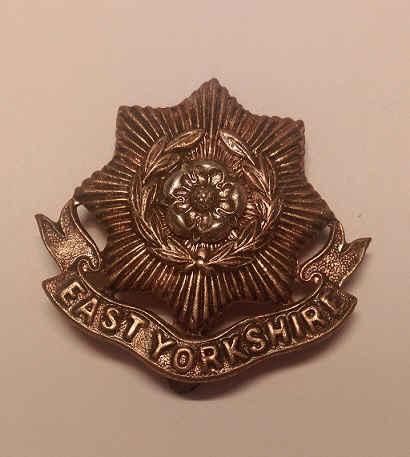
- East Yorkshire Regiment cap badge
- Active: 29 August 1914 – 26 May 1919
- Country: United Kingdom
- Branch: New Army
- Role: Infantry
- Size: Brigade (4 Battalions and Reserve)
- Part of: 92nd Brigade
- Garrison/HQ: Kingston upon Hull
- Nicknames: Hull Commercials (10th Bn); Hull Tradesmen (11th Bn); Hull Sportsmen (12th Bn); T'others (13th Bn)
- Patron: Charles Wilson, 2nd Baron Nunburnholme
- Anniversaries: 28 June (Capture of Oppy Wood)
- Engagements: Battle of the Somme; Battle of the Ancre; Battle of Arras; Capture of Oppy Wood; German spring offensive Hundred Days Offensive

Commanders
- Notable commanders: Lt-Col Daniel Burges, VC

Insignia
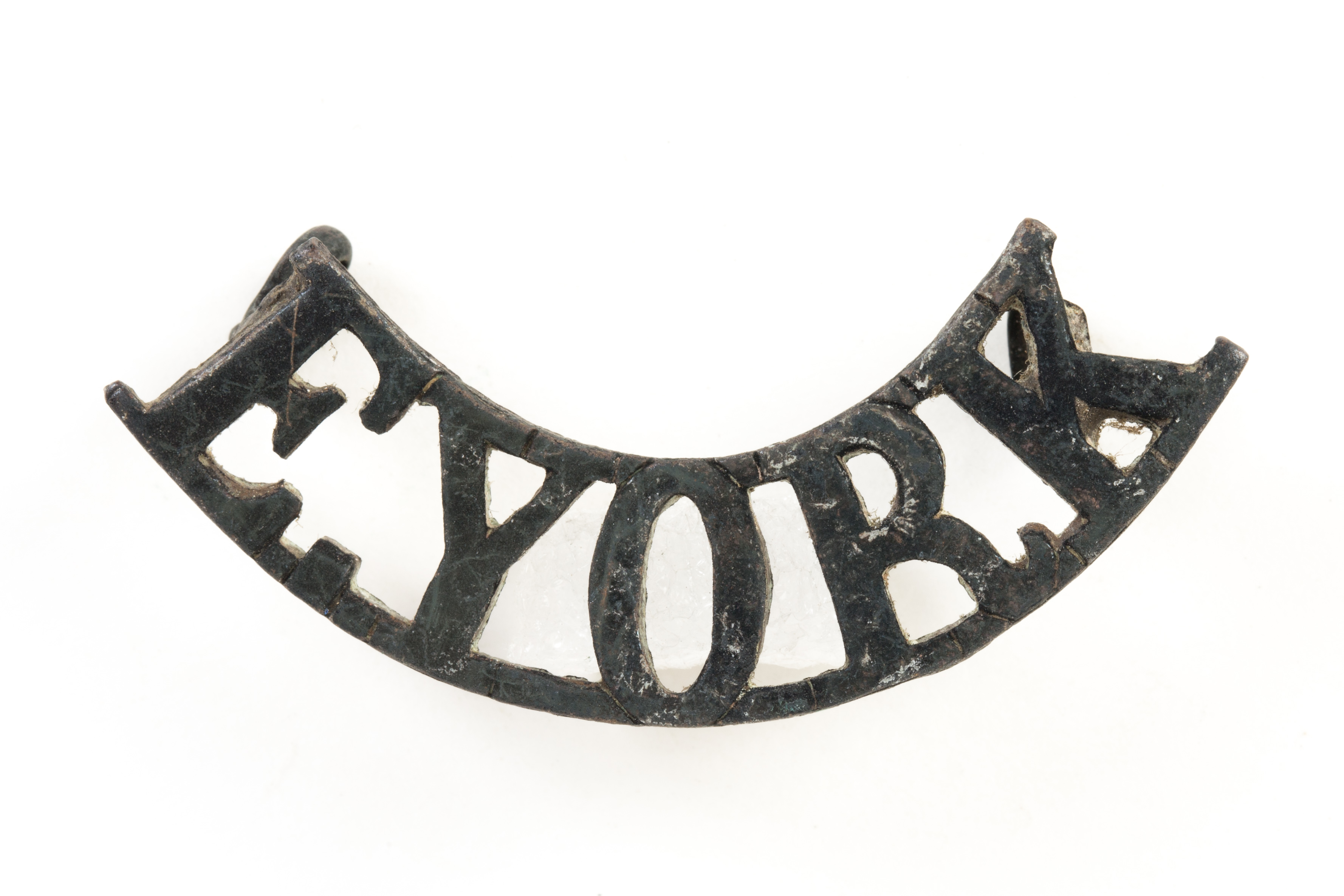
- Shoulder title of the East Yorkshire Regiment

The Hull Pals were a brigade of four battalions of the East Yorkshire Regiment (the "East Yorks") raised as part of Kitchener's Army in 1914. They served in 31st Division at Serre on the first day of the Battle of the Somme in 1916, though they escaped the worst of the disaster. However, they suffered heavy casualties in the same area later in the year, and again at Oppy Wood in early 1917. They continued to serve on the Western Front for the rest of the war, including hard fighting against the German spring offensive and in the final Hundred Days Offensive.

== Recruitment ==
Alfred Leete's recruitment poster for Kitchener's Army.

On 6 August 1914, less than 48 hours after Britain's declaration of war, Parliament sanctioned an increase of 500,000 men for the Regular Army, and on 11 August the newly appointed Secretary of State for War, Field Marshal Earl Kitchener of Khartoum, issued his famous call to arms: "Your King and Country Need You", urging the first 100,000 volunteers to come forward. This group of six divisions with supporting arms became known as Kitchener's First New Army, or "K1". The flood of volunteers overwhelmed the ability of the army to absorb and organise them, and by the time the Fifth New Army (K5) was authorised, many of its constituent units were being organised as "Pals battalions" under the auspices of mayors and corporations of towns up and down the country.

The initiative for the "Pals battalions" came from the Director of Recruiting at the War Office (WO), General Sir Henry Rawlinson, who suggested that many man working in finance in the City of London "would be willing to enlist if they were assured that they would serve with their friends". The 10th "Stockbrokers" Battalion of the Royal Fusiliers was raised in less than a week in August. Impressed by the success, the Earl of Derby coined the phrase "a battalion of pals", and began recruiting in Liverpool. Soon they were springing up all over the country.

On 29 August 1914, Charles Wilson, 2nd Baron Nunburnholme had a meeting with Kitchener. Nunburnholme, head of a family of shipowners in Kingston upon Hull, was a former Major in the 2nd Volunteer Battalion, East Yorkshire Regiment, and held a Distinguished Service Order (DSO) from service with the City Imperial Volunteers during the Second Boer War. In 1914 he was Lord-Lieutenant of the East Riding of Yorkshire and President of the East Riding Territorial Association (ERTA). At this meeting, Kitchener authorised Nunburnholme and the ERTA to raise a battalion of the East Yorkshire Regiment. This was unusual because most of the county Territorial Associations were fully engaged with recruiting and equipping their existing Territorial Force (TF) units and had no time for the New Army units. In contrast, by the end of 1915 Lord Nunburnholme and the ERTA had not only raised 2nd and 3rd Line TF units for the East Riding Regiment, Royal Field Artillery (RFA), Royal Garrison Artillery (RGA) and Royal Engineers but a full infantry brigade of 'Hull Pals' with a depot battalion, three RGA heavy batteries (the 11th (1st Hull), 124th (2nd Hull) and 146th (3rd Hull)) and the 31st (Hull) Divisional Ammunition Column, RFA. Lord Nunburnholme asked Major W.H. Carver, a retired Militia officer (3rd Battalion, (King's Own Yorkshire Light Infantry), to command the new unit while it was being recruited.

The Hull Daily Mail of 31 August 1914 carried Lord Nunburnholme's proposal to raise a "Commercial Battalion" from men working in business offices in Hull who would serve alongside their friends. (Note: This unit was advertised as the 7th (Hull) Battalion, taking its number after the K1 battalion being recruited at the East Riding Regiment's depot at Victoria Barracks, Beverley, but the number was officially assigned to the K2 battalion.) Recruitment opened the following day at Wenlock Barracks on Anlaby Road, loaned by the ERTA, and 200 men were attested on the first day. Some came en masse, such as groups from Reckitt and Sons' chemical works and the North Eastern Railway Dock Superintendents' office. The battalion reached its full establishment (just over 1000 men) on 5 September, and recruiting immediately began for a 2nd Hull Battalion.

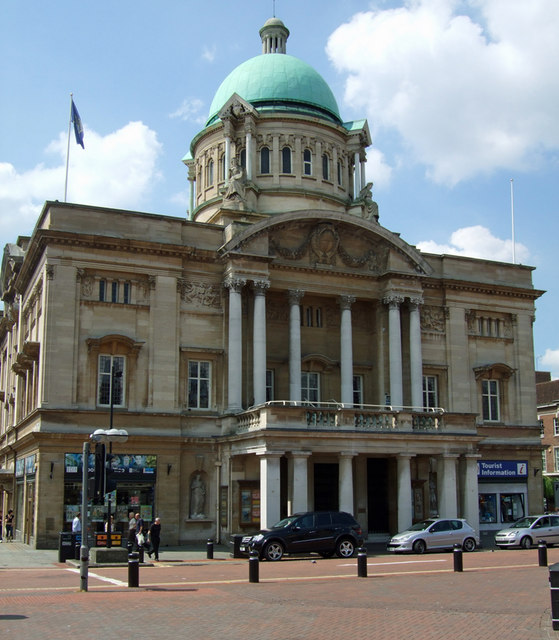
Hull City Hall.

Wenlock Barracks and the peacetime Army Recruiting Office at Pryme Street were inadequate for the surge of volunteers from all over the East Riding, so Lord Nunburnholme borrowed Hull City Hall and opened it on 6 September as the Central Hull Recruiting Office for all the units being raised. Douglas Boyd, a Hull Corporation employee, was commissioned as Lieutenant and appointed recruiting officer. The 'Commercials' took over the fair ground at Walton Street as a drill field.

The 2nd Hull Battalion was the "Tradesmen", which was recruited to full strength in three days. Lieutenant-Colonel J.L. Stanley, formerly of the 5th (Cyclist) Bn East Riding Regiment (TF), was placed in temporary command and set up battalion headquarters (HQ) in the cricket pavilion on Anlaby Road.

The 3rd Hull Battalion was the "Sportsmen". The Hon Stanley Jackson, the former England cricket captain, was the chief speaker at a public meeting held at the Park Street Artillery Barracks on 12 September to raise recruits for this battalion, which reached full strength in October. A number of the recruits were drawn from Hull Docks, including members of the violent "Silver Hatchet Gang". The battalion drilled in Pearson Park.

Lord Nunburnholme organised a second recruiting campaign in Hull in November, which raised a further 894 men for the 4th Hull Battalion which took any able-bodied recruits, regardless of background, and for want of a better name was known in the Yorkshire vernacular as "T'others". It drilled in the Market Place.

Major Carver stood down from the "Commercials" on 12 September, and was succeeded in command by Lt-Col A.J. Richardson, a retired Regular Army officer who had commanded 1st Bn East Riding Regiment before the war. Lieutenant-Colonel Stanley was replaced at the head of the "Tradesmen" by Lt-Col Beauchamp St Clair–Ford, another retired officer, and moved on to raise the "T'Others" until Lt-Col R.H. Dewing (retired, Indian Army) took over. The first CO of the "Sportsmen" was Lt-Col H.R. Pease, formerly of the Special Reserve.

== Training ==
Until early 1915, most of the men were billeted in their own homes, attending daily training in the parks and squares around Hull, or route marches to the outlying villages. One company of the "Commercials" became known as "Glossop's Greyhounds" because of the speed of their route marching. There was a shortage of people with previous military experience who could carry out the training, and no weapons with which to train. (Note: There is an unverified story that Lord Nunburnholme acquired Winchester repeating rifles in the US at his own expense for the Hull Pals' drill.) As with many of the Kitchener and TF recruits across the country, there were no uniforms available at first, but the Hull Pals were lucky in receiving their khaki uniforms in November. Until then, they wore civilian dress with armbands in battalion colours. The ERTA appealed for winter clothing for all the recruits in the East Riding. The appeal was headed by Lady Nunburnholme, who also set up the Hull Voluntary Aid Committee, which distributed clothing to troops at the front, trained nurses, and sent parcels to prisoners of war.

Field Marshal Earl Roberts, VC, was appointed Honorary Colonel of the 1st Hull Battalion on 11 November; unfortunately he died on 14 November. After the Army's minimum height requirement was lowered for Bantam battalions in November, a 5th Hull Battalion – known as "Bobs' Battalion" after the diminutive hero Earl Roberts ('Bobs') – began to be raised, but failed to reach its minimum establishment strength and was broken up to provide reserves.

In mid-November the 1st Hull Bn moved to Hornsea for defence duties on a stretch of coast from Mappleton to Ulrome. The camp was unfinished, 60 men being crowded into each 30-man hut without doors or windows, and the whole camp was a sea of mud. The battalion did receive old Long Lee-Enfield rifles, but when the WO asked for a report on their efficiency Lt-Col Richardson reported that "rifles will certainly go off, doubtful which end."

On 10 December the formation of the Fifth New Army (K5) was authorised: the four Hull battalions were to form 113th Brigade of 38th Division. The other brigades of the division were composed of Pals battalions from Northern England – Accrington Pals, Barnsley Pals (two battalions), Bradford Pals (two battalions), Durham Pals, Leeds Pals and the Sheffield City Battalion. Similarly, all the field artillery came from Yorkshire, including the Divisional Ammunition Column from Hull The four battalions of Hull Pals also received their formal titles at this time:

- 10th (Service) Battalion, East Yorkshire Regiment (1st Hull)
- 11th (Service) Battalion, East Yorkshire Regiment (2nd Hull)
- 12th (Service) Battalion, East Yorkshire Regiment (3rd Hull)
- 13th (Service) Battalion, East Yorkshire Regiment (4th Hull)

On 13 December, each New Army battalion was authorised to increase its establishment by 250 men (to 1350), forming a fifth (depot) company to provide reinforcements.

On Christmas Eve every officer and man in the Hull Pals and Heavy Artillery received a Christmas Card from Lord Nunburnholme consisting of a picture of St George slaying the dragon with the badge of the East Yorkshire Regiment and coloured bands representing the distinctive armbands worn by the different battalions and batteries.

In April 1915 the WO changed its policy: the K4 battalions now became Reserve battalions with the role of training reinforcements for the K1–K3 Service battalions going overseas. The six K4 divisions were therefore broken up and their numbers reassigned to the first six K5 divisions. Thus 113th Brigade of 38th Division was renumbered as 92nd Brigade of 31st Division.

By April all four battalions were in camps in the East Riding: 10th at Hornsea, 11th at Ousethorpe Camp, 12th at South Dalton and 13th at Beverley Westwood. Local training for the Hull Pals ended in late May and early June, and the units of 31st Division began to assemble at South Camp, Ripon, where brigade training began in earnest. Musketry training was finally begun in August, and in September the division. moved to Hurdcott Camp at Fovant where the brigade received SMLE service rifles and carried out final intensive battle training on Salisbury Plain. The CO of 10th Bn, Lt-Col Richardson, was removed from command after arguments with authority, (Note: Richardson later went to France in command of 8th Bn South Lancashire Regiment, but was removed from command for his views on execution for cowardice, and returned to the retired List.) and replaced by Lt-Col Daniel Burges, a Regular officer from the Gloucestershire Regiment who had been wounded at the Second Battle of Ypres.

=== 14th & 15th (Reserve) Battalions ===
In August 1915 a new 14th (Reserve) Bn (Hull) was formed at Lichfield, Staffordshire, from the depot companies of the four Hull battalions as part of 21st Reserve Brigade. As a 'Local Reserve' unit for the four battalions it had an approximate establishment of 2600 men; the other units of 21st Reserve Bde similarly supported the other Pals battalions of 31st Division. In January 1916 it moved to Clipstone Camp in Nottinghamshire; by April 1916 it was at Seaton Delaval when it split off a new 15th (Reserve) Bn.

On 1 September 1916 Local Reserve units were incorporated into the Training Reserve (TR): 14th became the 90th Training Reserve Bn, while the 15th was absorbed by 15th (Reserve) Battalion, York and Lancaster Regiment (the Local Reserve unit for Sheffield City Battalion and the Barnsley Pals) as 91st Training Reserve Bn. Both of these battalions remained in 21st Reserve Bde, stationed in the Blyth area. The training staff retained their East Yorks badges.

On 14 July 1917, 90th TR Bn was redesignated 264th (Infantry) Bn, TR, and by 25th September it had joined 217th Brigade in 72nd Division at Ipswich in Suffolk. On 1 November it was transferred to the King's Own Yorkshire Light Infantry (KOYLI) as 51st (Graduated) Bn. 72nd Division was broken up at the beginning of 1918 and on 15 January the battalion moved to Doncaster to join 208th Bde in 69th Division. By May 1918 it was at Welbeck and transferred to 207th Bde in the same division. About August 1918 it returned to Clipstone Camp, where it remained for the rest of the war. After the war ended it was converted into a service battalion on 8 February 1919, but was absorbed into 5th Bn KOYLI on 28 February.

== Egypt ==
On 29 November 1915 the 31st Division received warning orders to join the British Expeditionary Force in France, and advance parties set out for the embarkation ports of Folkestone and Southampton. At the last minute, the destination was changed to Egypt, the advance parties were recalled, and on 7 December the troops embarked at Devonport.

The division reached Port Said between 24 December and 23 January 1916 and went into the Suez Canal defences at Qantara. On 26 February orders arrived to reverse the process and on 1 March the division began re-embarking at Port Said. It unloaded at Marseille between 6 and 16 March and then concentrated in the Somme area as part of the BEF. It remained on the Western Front for the rest of the war.

== Somme ==
The brigade was first introduced to trench warfare on 21 March by groups being attached to the 36th (Ulster) Division in the line. On 28 March the 10th and 11th Bns relieved Ulster battalions in front of Beaumont-Hamel and Y Ravine, with 12th and 13th Bns in support. Although this was a quiet sector of the line, the battalions suffered their first casualties during this short tour, mainly from German Minenwerfers (trench mortars). Shortly afterwards 31st Division formed its own light trench mortar batteries (TMBs), with the Hull Pals contributing men to 92/1 and 92/2 TMBs for 92 Bde. 10th Battalion also provided working parties to assist the 252nd Tunnelling Company, Royal Engineers, digging the Hawthorn Ridge mine that was to be exploded to launch the forthcoming Battle of the Somme. Over the next weeks the battalions took their turns in the routine of trench holding, working parties, patrolling and trench raiding, with a constant drain on manpower from shelling and snipers.

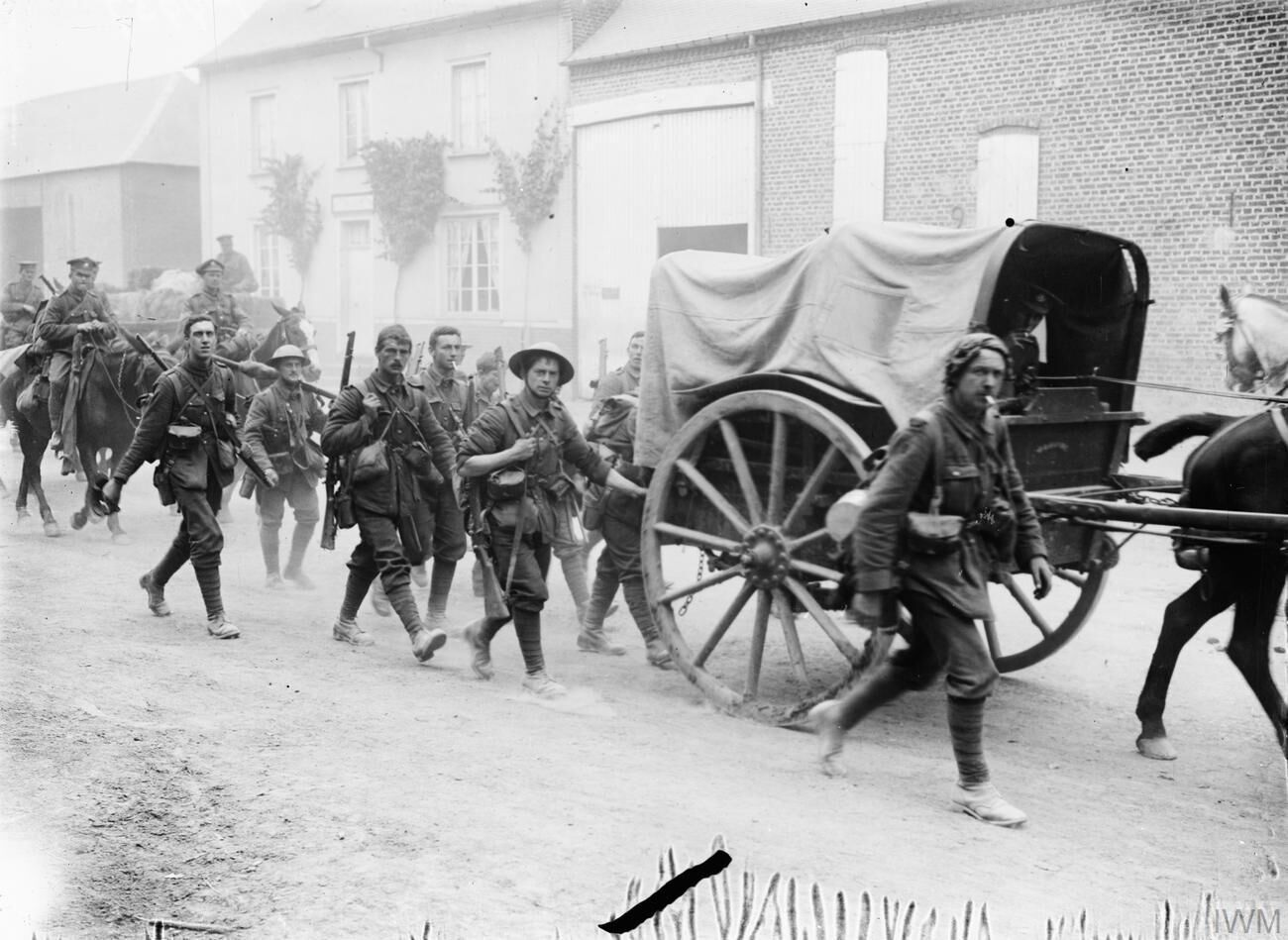
Lewis gun section of the 10th Bn East Yorks (Hull Commercials) near Doullens, 28 June 1916.

=== Serre ===
92 Brigade was to be in support of 31st Division's assault on the first day of the Battle (1 July). It held the front line trenches during the British bombardment in the days leading up to the battle, suffering significant casualties from the German counter-bombardment (about 100 killed and wounded for 10th Bn alone). (Note: It is alleged that Lt-Col Burges was removed from command for refusing to risk any more men after two failed attempts to recover the body of an officer (son of a well-known politician) from No man's land during the bombardment. Burges left 10th Bn East Yorks on 30 June to become an instructor at the Senior Officers' School. He later commanded another battalion at Salonika and won a VC.) The night before the battle, working parties of 10th Bn were out in No man's land cutting lanes through the British barbed wire for the assaulting troops to pass through. It then withdrew into the support trenches, leaving D Company to hold the front line while the assault went in. 93 and 94 Brigades went 'over the top' at 07.30 on 1 July, 10 minutes after the explosion of the nearby Hawthorn Ridge mine had alerted the enemy. Their objective was the village of Serre. The advancing lines were almost annihilated by German machine guns and shellfire, and only a few parties got into the enemy front line, where they remained pinned down all day.

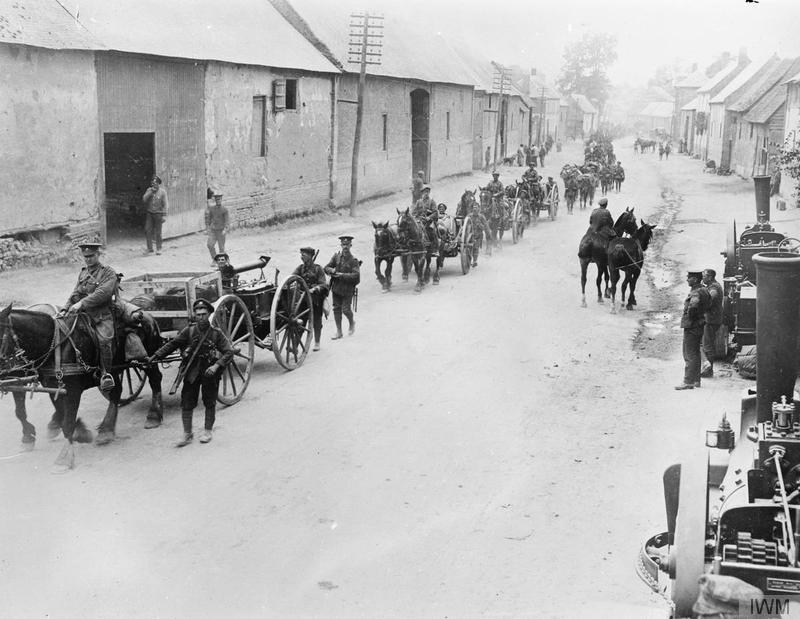
Battalion transport of the 10th Bn East Yorks (Hull Commercials) near Doullens, 28 June 1916.

31st Division found it impossible to get any support across the fire-swept No man's land for the rest of the day. 92 Brigade was ordered to renew the attack with two battalions during the night. Luckily, this order was cancelled: even if the brigade could have been brought up through the shattered communication and jumping-off trenches, which were full of dead and wounded, there were no British troops left in the German positions. D Company of 10th Bn had held the British trenches all day and were exhausted, but continued to hold them overnight, stationed in the reserve trench with an outpost in the front line. The brigade had been lucky, and only suffered a handful of casualties during the day.

On 2 July the shattered division was pulled out of the line and sent north to a quiet sector for rest and refit, though there was the usual trickle of casualties associated with trench holding and raiding.

=== Ancre ===
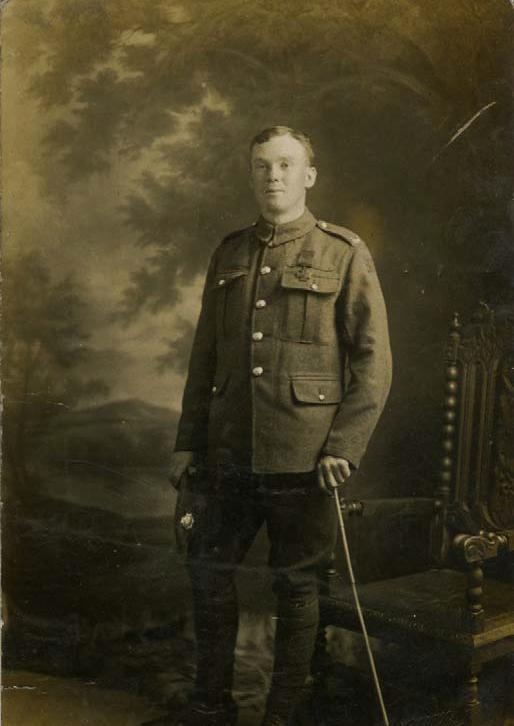
Pte John Cunningham, VC.

The Somme Offensive was still going on at the end of October when 31st Division returned to the sector for the Battle of the Ancre, which was to be the last big operation of the year. Serre had still not been taken, and 92 Bde was assigned to the attack alongside 3rd Division (the rest of 31st Division was still too shattered to take part). A 48-hour preliminary bombardment began on 11 November, and the brigade moved into the trenches on the night of 12/13, along communication trenches clogged with mud. Zero hour was 05.30 on 13 November, and 12th and 13th East Yorks led the way up the slope towards Serre, with 11th Bn in close support and 10th providing flank guards and carrying parties. Fog, light rain and a smokescreen reduced visibility to a few yards, and initially the two battalions had little difficulty, 12th Bn achieving their objectives within 20 minutes. The first wave of 13th Bn took the German front trench, and the following waves reached the second trench, but the battalion of 3rd Division to their right was in difficulties and could not get across No man's land. The third wave of 13th Bn took the German third trench, but were counter-attacked from their right and cut off, about 50 men being taken prisoner. 12th and 13th Bns held on in the captured trenches, but 3rd Division made no progress. Small-scale fighting went on all day, and Private John Cunningham of 12th Bn won a Victoria Cross (VC) for fighting on alone when all the rest of his team of bombers became casualties. A Lewis gun team from 10th Bn stopped an attack on the left flank of 12th Bn. By the end of the day both battalions had been driven back to their starting positions. Only two of the 16 officers of 12th Bn who had gone into the attack remained unwounded. The brigade suffered over 800 casualties, mostly in the two attacking battalions.

The Hull Pals remained on the Ancre through the winter of 1916–17, progressively diluted as reinforcements came in from other battalions of the East Yorks, or from other regiments (including a draft from the Royal Norfolk Regiment). On 24 February information arrived that the Germans had evacuated Serre, and fighting patrols went out the following day; some met considerable opposition but 11th Bn pushed through to the German fourth line. The Germans now began bombarding their own trenches to cover their withdrawal, which was the start of their retirement to the Hindenburg Line. The battalions suffered a number of casualties in attacks following up the retirement.

== Arras ==
=== Oppy Wood ===
Oppy Wood, 1917. Evening by John Nash

On 8 April 1917, 92 Bde left the Ancre and moved to the Arras sector where the Battle of Arras began the next day. After a period of training and trench-holding, the brigade moved into assembly trenches opposite Oppy during the night of 2/3 May, under shellfire. The British creeping barrage started at 03.45 and the brigade set off in four waves, in the dark and mist, into severe machine gun fire. 10th Battalion found that in many places the wire had not been cut and had to funnel through the few gaps. This slowed the attack, which fell behind the barrage. All four company commanders were wounded, and the attack became disorganised. It was later discovered that a number of 10th Bn's men were captured having got through the German trenches into Oppy village. The rest of the battalion remained pinned down in No man's land all day, having lost over 100 men. Similarly, 11th Bn was hit by machine guns firing from Oppy Wood and pinned down. The officers, including 2nd Lieutenant Jack Harrison, reorganised their men for a second attempt. This too failed, but Harrison dashed on alone to try to silence the machine gun that was holding up his men. He was killed and later awarded a posthumous VC. 11th Battalion lost 63 men killed. 12th Battalion's attack also failed, suffering 83 killed. The three attacking battalions withdrew from No man's land to their own trenches after dark, where they were relieved by the Accrington Pals while 13th East Yorks brought in the dead and wounded from the battlefield.

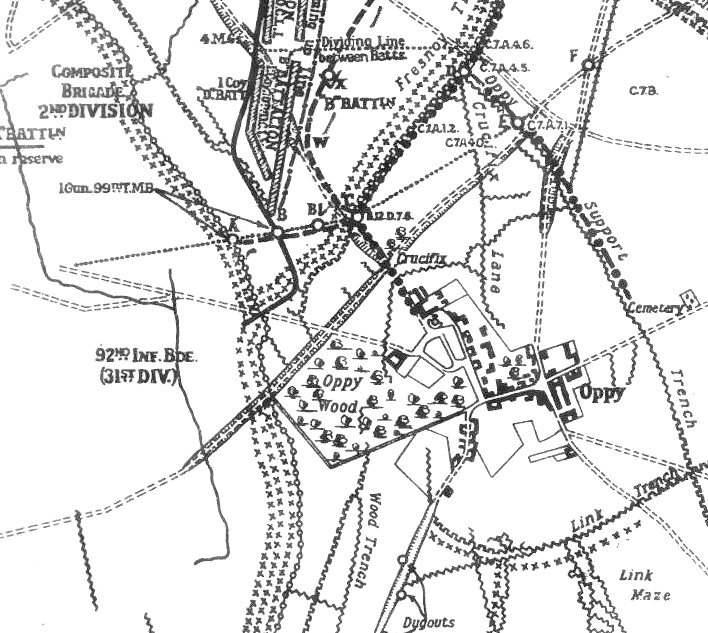
92 Bde's attack at Oppy Wood 3–4 May 1917.

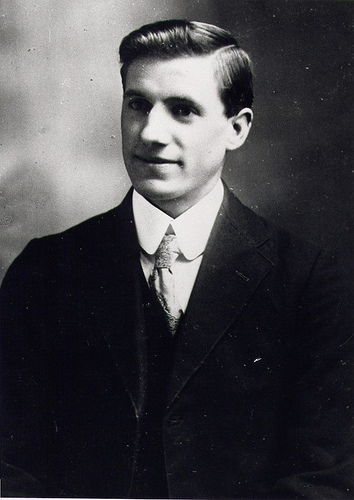
Lt Jack Harrison, 11th Bn East Yorks, killed in action at Oppy Wood 3 May 1917, posthumously awarded the VC.

Casualties in 12th Bn had been so severe that it was temporarily reduced to two composite companies attached to the 10th and 11th Bns respectively. A fresh attack on Oppy Wood was arranged for 28 June. This time the attack was to be made by 94 Bde with 92 Bde in support. 10th Battalion was the brigade reserve, two companies of 11th Bn were to hold the front line, and 13th Bn was to provide carrying parties. Before the attack, each battalion of 92 Bde supplied a detachment for a trench raid to reconnoitre the objectives (Cadorna Trench, Wood Trench and Windmill Trench). 94 Brigade made its attack in the evening of 28 June and successfully took the trenches, completing the Capture of Oppy Wood.

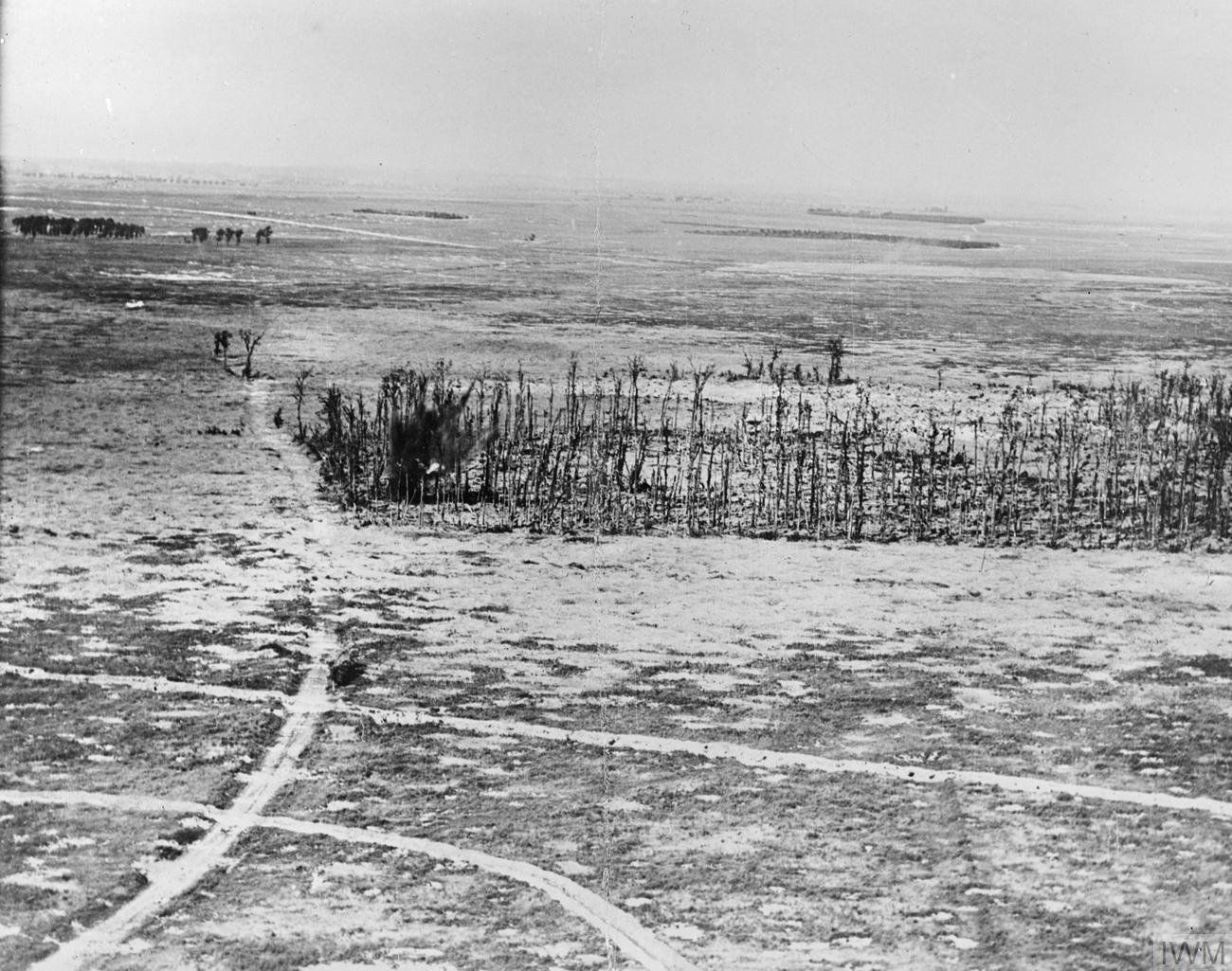
Oppy Wood from the air

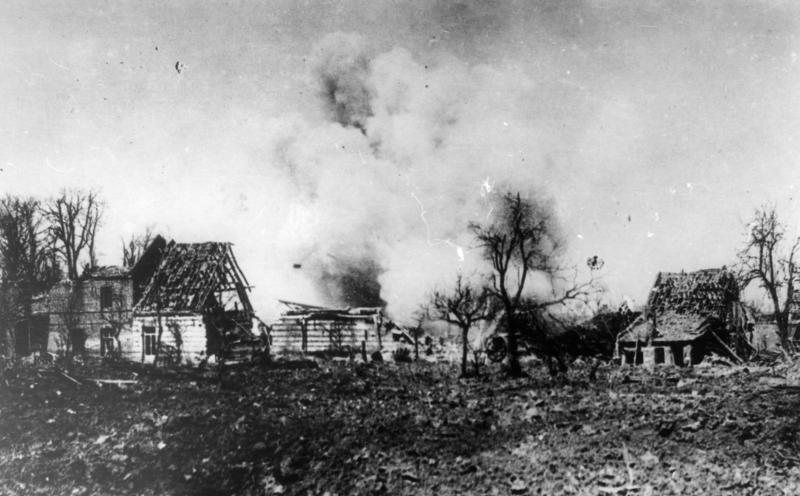
Oppy under shellfire, May 1917.

31st Division was not committed to the Third Ypres Offensive of Summer 1917, which culminated in the dreadful Battle of Passchendaele, possibly because it was still not considered to have recovered from its ordeal on the Somme a year before. Instead, it served alongside the Canadian Corps holding the captured line on Vimy Ridge during July and August. In September it moved to the Arleux-en-Gohelles sector, where it continued until the end of the year, trench holding, patrolling and trench raiding. The platoons were reorganised on the new system with specialist sections of riflemen, bombers, rifle grenadiers and Lewis gunners.

=== Disbandments ===
By the end of 1917 the BEF was suffering an acute manpower shortage. As a result, its brigades were reorganised on a three-battalion basis in February 1918 and many battalions were disbanded to reinforce the remainder. 12th Bn East Yorks was drafted to the 6th and 7th Bns East Yorks (11th (Northern) Division and 17th (Northern) Division respectively), to 10th and 11th Bns in 92nd Bde, to the 2/4th Bn West Riding Regiment in 62nd (2nd West Riding) Division, and the remainder to the 4th Entrenching Battalion. 13th Battalion was also drafted, the residue going to 4th Entrenching Bn. The two remaining Hull Pals battalions were joined in 92 Bde by the Accrington Pals (11th (Service) Bn East Lancashire Regiment) from the disbanded 94 Bde (which had absorbed the whole of 8th Bn East Lancs from 37th Division).

== Spring Offensive ==
When the German spring offensive opened on 21 March 1918, 31st Division was in reserve, with 10th and 11th Bns digging trenches in the 'Army Line' behind the front. On 23 March the division was sent up to hold off the German attack at St Léger, but 92 Bde remained in reserve at Ervillers, improvising the defences. Ervillers was attacked on the evening of 24 March, the defence being confused by British troops retreating from the forward defences. Two companies of 10th Bn were pushed up to reinforce 11th Bn fighting in the village streets. About midnight a German patrol got into the village but was captured by 11th Bn's HQ staff. The following day the 11th Bn was reinforced by 10th Bn Manchester Regiment of 42nd (East Lancashire) Division and their combined fire stopped the German advance. However, events elsewhere meant that the 31st and 42nd Divisions were ordered on the morning of 27 March to retire through Courcelles-le-Comte.

=== Ayette ===
The brigade defended Ayette aerodrome against repeated attacks from 11.20 to 16.30, when with both flanks 'in the air' it brigade pulled back to the partly-dug 'Purple Line' in front of Ayette village. Between 24 and 27 March 10th Bn had lost 211 officers and men, and was praised "for its exceptional gallantry on March 27" by the Commander in Chief of the BEF, Sir Douglas Haig. During the night, Lt-Col Headlam of 10th Bn led up a composite battalion of troops from the quartermasters' details of all three battalions to take over part of the Purple Line, and they helped to recover some 18-pounder ammunition from behind enemy lines, which was fired the following day. Although fighting continued elsewhere along the line, 28 March was a quieter day for 92 Bde, and 11th Bn took over some trenches started by 210th Field Company, Royal Engineers, which they continued to dig. The brigade was relieved on 31 March and marched back to billets near Pommier.

=== Hazebrouck ===
While resting in the Monchy-Breton area the brigade received large numbers of reinforcements, mainly under the age of 19. The bombardment for the second phase of the German offensive (the Battles of the Lys) opened on 7 April, and by 11 April the brigade had been called forward in ex-London buses to form a defensive line near Estaires through which retreating British and Portuguese troops could withdraw. 11th Battalion held the outposts while 10th Bn pushed forward to make contact with the enemy. 10th Battalion's patrols found no friendly troops in front, only Germans. Next day the Germans threw in all their reserves to try to take Hazebrouck, with 10th Bn also being attacked by aircraft. After both flanks were again left in the air, 10th and 11th Bns were forced to retire across watercourses and hedges, pursued by the enemy, until they reached a railway embankment at Méteren and a line at Merris held by the 11th East Lancs and another composite battalion of details from five different divisions under Lt-Col Gurney of 11th East Yorks. The attack was renewed on the morning of 13 May, when the defenders caused heavy casualties among the attacking Germans. The brigade withdrew in early morning mist the following day through a new line held by fresh Australian and British troops, who defeated the attacks and ensured the safety of Hazebrouck.

=== Le Becque ===
During April, 10th East Yorks lost 368 men, and 11th lost 426, but fresh drafts were absorbed. Meanwhile, a temporary 92nd Composite Bn was formed from two companies from each of the battalions to relieve an Australian unit in the line. Before the end of the month the brigade was again taking turns in the line with the Australians, carrying out a number of raids. On 24 May the brigade came out of the line and began training for offensive operations. 31st Division was scheduled for Operation Borderland, a limited attack on La Becque and other fortified farms in front of the Forest of Nieppe to be carried out on 28 June, chosen because it was the anniversary of the capture of Oppy. The barrage began at 06.00 and the brigade followed it closely with all three battalions in line, in what was described as 'a model operation' for artillery cooperation. Some casualties were suffered from British shells falling short, but the German resistance was slight and the final objectives were taken by 07.25. Several hundred prisoners were captured, together with field guns and mortars. The positions were consolidated under long range machine gun fire. German troops massing for a counter-attack were dispersed by artillery fire. The brigade was relieved on 30 June.

== Hundred Days ==
Successes like La Becque showed that the tide of war was turning. After a relatively quiet period in July, during which 92 Bde achieved small advances through aggressive patrolling and seizing strongpoints (so-called "peaceful penetration"), the Allies began a coordinated offensive in August. 31st Division captured Vieux-Berquin on 18 August 1918 and pushed forward until running into serious opposition on 21 August. After a short rest, 92 Bde returned to the front to continue pushing forward behind patrols. On 4 September, advancing without a barrage towards the Warnave river south of Ploegsteert, 10th Bn ran into strong German positions and suffered heavy casualties from German machine guns in strongpoints such as Soyer Farm. 11th East Lancs renewed the attack the following day and took Soyer Farm, but lost it to a counter-attack. 11th East Yorks were no more successful with a dawn attack on 6 September. A smokescreen and barrage on 7 September did not help 10th East Yorks, who advanced 1200 yards but failed to gain Soyer Farm, which remained in German hands when the brigade was relieved on 12 September.

=== Ploegsteert Wood ===
The brigade returned to the same trenches on 23 September, but the machine guns in Soyer Farm prevented any "peaceful penetration". A formal attack was arranged for the morning of 28 September (the opening day of the Fifth Battle of Ypres) but was postponed to 15.00 because of bad weather. 10th East Yorks advanced behind a creeping barrage protecting the right flank of 11th East Lancs and suffered heavy casualties, but the general retirement of the Germans along the whole line allowed 10th Bn to push on through Ploegsteert Wood the next day, despite considerable fire from the enemy pillboxes, which were untouched by artillery shells. Following through, 11th East Yorks advanced the brigade's line up to the River Lys on 3 October.

=== Pursuit ===
Returning to the line on 12 October, patrols from 10th East Yorks slipped across the Lys on a raft during the night of 14/15 October and established posts on the far bank. The following afternoon A Company crossed and then advanced under a barrage and reached the Deûlémont–Warneton road. 11th East Yorks passed through the following night and continued the advance on 16 and 17 October, liberating several villages. 10th East Yorks took up the pursuit the next day, advancing in company columns screened by XV Corps cyclist battalion, and then 11th East Lancs passed through to liberate the town of Tourcoing. German rearguards held the Tournai–Mouscron railway line behind, but were driven off. Pressure was kept up through 19 and 20 October, until the brigade was squeezed out of the advancing line and went into support.

Back in the line from 28 October, the brigade continued to advance slowly against machine gun and shell fire, from rearguards who "did not appear disposed to give ground". It served as divisional reserve for an attack at Tieghem on 31 October 1918 that was so successful the reserve was not required.

On 3 November the division was withdrawn into reserve. It returned to the line on the night of 6/7 November. On 9 November the 11th East Lancs crossed the Scheldt and the brigade and continued to push forward. 11th East Yorks advanced as part of a pursuit force including an RFA battery and companies from the divisional machine gun battalion, the Motor Machine Gun Corps and XIX Corps cyclists, and marched 23,000 yards (21,000 m) on 10 November. Despite heavy German artillery fire on the night of 10/11 November, when the Armistice with Germany came into force on 11 November, 11th East Lancs were leading the division, and scouts reported that there were no enemy in front.

== Disbandment ==
The division began to pull back on 13 November, and by the end of the month the Hull battalions were established in 'Hull Camp' south of St-Omer and engaged in road repair. Demobilisation (chiefly of coal miners) began on 11 December and proceeded at a steadily increasing rate during January 1919. On 29 January the 10th and 11th Bns were sent by rail to Calais to deal with possible riots by men working in the Ordnance depot. They returned to St Omer within two days. Demobilisation accelerated in February and by April both battalions had been reduced to cadres. These cadres left for England on 22 May. They arrived at Hull Paragon Station on 26 May and after being inspected by Lord Nunburnholme they marched through the city to the Guildhall and officially disbanded.

== Commanding Officers ==
The following officers commanded the Hull Pals battalions:

- 10th (Service) Bn (1st Hull):
  - Maj W.H. Carver
  - Lt-Col A.J. Richardson, DSO
  - Lt-Col D. Burges, VC, DSO
  - Lt-Col W.B. Pearson, CMG, CBE
  - Lt-Col C.C. Stapledon
  - Lt-Col T.A. Headlam
  - Lt-Col E.H. Rigg, DSO**
  - Lt-Col R.C. Hewson, MC
- 11th (Service) Bn (2nd Hull):
  - Lt-Col J.L. Stanley, VD
  - Lt-Col B. St Clair–Ford
  - Lt-Col H.R.Pease
  - Lt-Col J.B.O. Trimble, DSO, MC
  - Maj J. Shaw, MC, OBE
  - Lt-Col F. Hardman, MC
  - Lt-Col S.H. Ferrad, DSO, MC
  - Lt-Col C.H. Gurney, DSO*
  - Lt-Col D.D. Anderson, MC
- 12th (Service) Bn (3rd Hull):
  - Lt-Col H.R.Pease
  - Lt-Col C.G. Wellesley, OBE
  - Lt-Col C.H Gurney, DSO*
- 13th (Service) Bn (4th Hull):
  - Lt-Col J.L. Stanley, VD
  - Lt-Col R.H. Dewing
  - Lt-Col A.K.M.C.W. Savory, DSO*
  - Lt-Col C.C.H. Twiss, DSO

== Insignia ==
31st Division's formation sign (first pattern).

Before uniforms became available, the Hull battalions wore variety of cloth armbands with their civilian dress. The lettering varied: the successive '7th BATT. E. YORKS REGT', '7th Hull Battn', '1st Hull Battn' and '10th E.Y.R.' reflected the early changes in designation of the 10th Bn. That battalion had red lettering on an off-white band (except the '10th E.Y.R.' version, which was on a small Union flag). The 2nd Bn had black lettering on light blue, the 3rd had black on horizontal yellow–black–yellow, and the 4th black on horizontal black-over-yellow-over-red. All the battalions adopted the East Yorks' cap badge and shoulder title when they became available. Later in Egypt, 92nd Bde adopted a white-over-red square or rectangle as its insignia, worn on the left side of the sun helmet pagri. On the Western Front this was moved to the back of the jacket, beneath the collar, with cloth bars to represent the battalion numbers in Roman numerals (I, II, II, IV). The original formation sign of 31st Division was a design with triangles and vertical lines (see picture). This was replaced in 1917 with overlapping York (white) and Lancaster (red) roses on right and left respectively; Yorkshire regiments wore this with the white overlapping the red.

== Casualties ==
The number of deaths on active service among the Hull Pals battalions were as follows:

- 10th (Service) Bn (1st Hull): 610
- 11th (Service) Bn (2nd Hull): 599
- 12th (Service) Bn (3rd Hull): 390
- 13th (Service) Bn (4th Hull): 314

== Memorials ==
After the war, the City of Hull erected a memorial in France on the edge of Oppy Wood.

A memorial wood named 'Oppy Wood' was planted at Cottingham outside Hull; it is maintained by the Woodland Trust.

== See also ==
- Imperial War Museum photographs of 10th Bn East Yorkshires on the march, 1916.
- Photographs of Oppy Wood memorial by Mike Antony.

== Notes ==
- Maj A.F. Becke,History of the Great War: Order of Battle of Divisions, Part 3a: New Army Divisions (9–26), London: HM Stationery Office, 1938/Uckfield: Naval & Military Press, 2007, ISBN 1-847347-41-X.
- Maj A.F. Becke,History of the Great War: Order of Battle of Divisions, Part 3b: New Army Divisions (30–41) and 63rd (R.N.) Division, London: HM Stationery Office, 1939/Uckfield: Naval & Military Press, 2007, ISBN 1-847347-41-X.
- David Bilton, Hull Pals, 10th, 11th 12th and 13th Battalions East Yorkshire Regiment – A History of 92 Infantry Brigade, 31st Division, Barnsley: Pen & Sword, 2014, ISBN 978-1-78346-185-1.
- David Bilton, Hull in the Great War 1914–1919, Barnsley: Pen & Sword, 2015, ISBN 978-1-47382-314-3.
- David Bilton, The Badges of Kitchener's Army, Barnsley: Pen & Sword, 2018, ISBN 978-1-47383-366-1.
- Gregory Blaxland, Amiens: 1918, London: Frederick Muller, 1968/Star, 1981, ISBN 0-352-30833-8.
- Burke's Peerage, Baronetage and Knightage, 100th Edn, London, 1953.
- Rupert Drake, The Road to Lindi: Hull Boys in Africa: The 1st (Hull) Heavy Battery Royal Garrison Artillery in East Africa and France 1914–1919, Brighton: Reveille Press, 2013, ISBN 978-1-908336-56-9.
- Brig-Gen Sir James E. Edmonds, History of the Great War: Military Operations, France and Belgium, 1914, Vol II, London: Macmillan, 1925/Imperial War Museum & Battery Press, 1995, ISBN 1-870423-55-0.
- Brig-Gen Sir James E. Edmonds, History of the Great War: Military Operations, France and Belgium, 1916, Vol I, London: Macmillan,1932/Woking: Shearer, 1986, ISBN 0-946998-02-7.
- Brig-Gen Sir James E. Edmonds & Lt-Col R. Maxwell-Hyslop, History of the Great War: Military Operations, France and Belgium 1918, Vol V, 26th September–11th November, The Advance to Victory, London: HM Stationery Office, 1947/Imperial War Museum and Battery Press, 1993, ISBN 1-870423-06-2.
- Clive Elderton & Gary Gibbs, World War One British Army Corps and Divisional Signs, Wokingham: Military History Society, 2018.
- Gen Sir Martin Farndale, History of the Royal Regiment of Artillery: Western Front 1914–18, Woolwich: Royal Artillery Institution, 1986, ISBN 1-870114-00-0.
- J.B.M. Frederick, Lineage Book of British Land Forces 1660–1978, Vol I, Wakefield: Microform Academic, 1984, ISBN 1-85117-007-3.
- Paddy Griffith, Battle Tactics of the Western Front: The British Army's Art of Attack 1916–18, Newhaven, CT, & London: Yale University Press, 1994, ISBN 0-300-05910-8.
- Mike Hibberd, Infantry Divisions, Identification Schemes 1917, Wokingham: Military History Society, 2016.
- Jack Horsfall & Nigel Cave, Battleground Europe: Somme: Serre, Barnsley: Pen & Sword, 1996, ISBN 0-85052-508-X
- Andrew Jackson, Accrington's Pals: The Full Story, Barnsley, Pen & Sword, 2013, ISBN 978-1-84884-469-8.
- Brig E.A. James, British Regiments 1914–18, London: Samson Books, 1978, ISBN 0-906304-03-2/Uckfield: Naval & Military Press, 2001, ISBN 978-1-84342-197-9.
- Peter H. Liddle (ed), Passchendaele in Perspective: The Third Battle of Ypres, London: Leo Cooper, 1997, ISBN 0-85052-552-7.
- Martin Middlebrook, The First Day on the Somme, 1 July 1916, London: Allen Lane 1971/Fontana, 1975.
- H.C. O’Neill, The Royal Fusiliers in the Great War, London: Heinemann, 1922.
- Instructions Issued by The War Office During July, 1915, London: HM Stationery Office.
- Instructions Issued by The War Office During September, 1915, London: HM Stationery Office.
- Army Council Instructions Issued During January, 1916, London, HM Stationery Office.
- Army Council Instructions Issued During September, 1916, London, HM Stationery Office.
- Who was Who, Vol II, 1916–1928, London: Bloomsbury, 2014, ISBN 978-1-40819336-5.

== External sources ==
- First World War at Humber Museums Archived 28 January 2018 at the Wayback Machine
- Imperial War Museum, War Memorials Register
- London Gazette
- The Long, Long Trail
- The Regimental Warpath 1914–1918 (archive site)
