= Daniel Burges =

British Victoria Cross recipient

- Colonel Burges, circa 1918
- Born: 1 July 1873; London, England
- Died: 24 October 1946 (aged 73); Bristol, Gloucestershire
- Burial place: Arnos Vale Cemetery, Bristol
- Military career
- Allegiance: United Kingdom
- Branch: British Army
- Service years: 1893–1923
- Rank: Lieutenant Colonel
- Units: Gloucestershire Regiment
- Commands: 10th (Service) Battalion, East Yorkshire Regiment; 7th Battalion, South Wales Borderers
- Conflicts: Second Boer War; First World War
- Awards: Victoria Cross; Distinguished Service Order; Croix de Guerre with Palm (France); War Cross (Greece) (2nd Class)

Lieutenant Colonel Daniel Burges, VC, DSO (1 July 1873 – 24 October 1946) was an English recipient of the Victoria Cross, the highest and most prestigious award for gallantry in the face of the enemy that can be awarded to British and Commonwealth forces.

== Biography ==
Burges was born in Bloomsbury, London, on 1 July 1873 and educated at Winchester College. He was commissioned on 21 October 1893 as a second lieutenant into the Gloucestershire Regiment, and was promoted to lieutenant on 8 July 1897. Following the outbreak of the Second Boer War in late 1899, Burges was with the 2nd battalion of his regiment as they were sent to South Africa in January 1900. He participated in the Relief of Kimberley, operations in the Orange Free State, actions at Poplar Grove, Driefontein, Vet River, Zand River, the operations in the Transvaal, Rhenoster Kop, operations in Orange River Colony and in Cape Colony. For his service in the war, he received the Queen's South Africa Medal with four clasps, and the King's South Africa Medal with two clasps. At the end of the war Burges returned to Southampton on the SS Orcana, arriving in November 1902.

Burges was promoted to captain on 25 October 1903. From 1908 to 1913 he was adjutant of the Punjab Volunteer Rifles. At the start of World War I he was with the 2nd Battalion, Gloucestershire Regiment with which he served at the Second Battle of Ypres where he was wounded and Mentioned in dispatches. After recovering from his wound he was appointed Temporary Lieutenant-Colonel to command the 10th (Service) Battalion, East Yorkshire Regiment (the 'Hull Commercials') on 11 November 1915. The battalion had just arrived at Fovant on Salisbury Plain to undergo intensive battle training with 31st Division before embarking for service overseas. It served in Egypt, guarding the Suez Canal from December to February 1916, when it was transferred to the British Expeditionary Force on the Western Front.

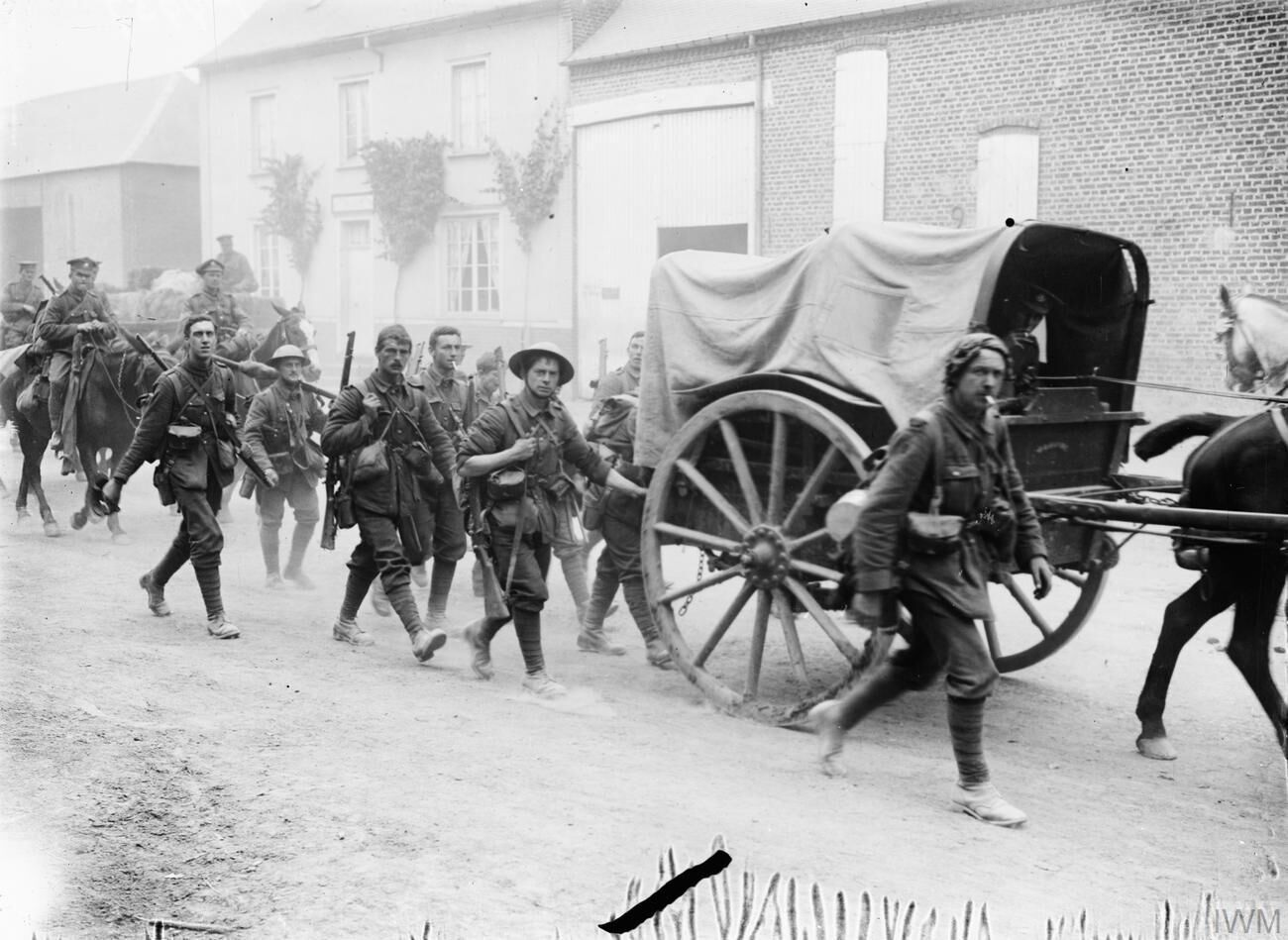
Lewis gun section of the 10th Bn East Yorks (Hull Commercials) near Doullens, 28 June 1916.

Over the forthcoming weeks the battalion took its turn in the routine of trench holding, working parties, patrolling and trench raiding. The 10th Battalion was to be in support of 31st Division's assault on the first day of the Battle of the Somme (1 July). It held the front line trenches during the British bombardment in the days leading up to the battle, suffering significant casualties from the German counter-bombardment (about 100 killed and wounded for 10th Bn alone).

It is alleged that Lt-Col Burges was removed from his command the day before the battle for refusing to risk any more men after two failed attempts to recover the body of an officer (a son of a well-known politician) from No man's land during the bombardment. Burges left 10th Bn East Yorks on 30 June to become an instructor at the Senior Officers' School. In September 1917 he took command of the 7th Bn South Wales Borderers at Salonika, and was awarded the Distinguished Service Order in May 1918.

== VC award ==
He was a 45 years old temporary lieutenant-colonel in The Gloucestershire Regiment commanding the 7th (Service) Battalion, The South Wales Borderers, British Army, during the First World War at the Battle of Doiran when the following deed took place for which he was awarded the VC.

On 18 September 1918 at Jumeaux, in the Balkans, valuable reconnaissance of the enemy front line trenches enabled Lieutenant Colonel Burges to bring his battalion, without casualties, to the assembly point, but later while some distance from the objective they came under severe machine-gun fire. Although he himself was wounded the colonel continued to lead his men with skill and courage until he was hit again twice and fell unconscious. He was taken prisoner by the Bulgarians, but was abandoned in a dug-out with one of his legs shattered.

He was made a brevet Lieutenant Colonel in January 1919 while still in hospital with his VC injuries. In retirement Burges served as Resident Governor and major of the Tower of London from 1 July 1923 to 1 July 1933. He later joined the British Fascists. He moved to Durdham Down, near Bristol, and from 1943 to 1945 he was county director of the British Red Cross.

Burges died in Bristol on 24 October 1946, aged 73, and was cremated at the Arnos Vale Cemetery, Bristol. A marble plaque was unveiled at the cemetery on 24 October 2006 (60 years to the day after he died).

== Family ==
Burges married Katherine Blanche Fortescue, second daughter of the late Captain Edmund Fortescue of the Rifle Brigade, in 1905. They had no children, and she died in 1931. In 1932 he married Mrs Florence Wray Taylor, daughter of the late W.G. Cox of Nutgrove, Rathfarnham, Dublin.
