= 31st Division (United Kingdom) =

WW1 British Army formation

- Formation sign of the 31st Division (first pattern).
- Active: April 1915 – March 1919
- Country: United Kingdom
- Branch: New Army
- Type: Infantry
- Size: Division
- Engagements: Battle of the Somme; Battle of the Ancre; Battle of Arras; German spring offensive Hundred Days Offensive

Commanders
- Notable commanders: Edward Fanshawe; Robert Wanless O'Gowan

The 31st Division was an infantry division of the British Army. It was raised in the Great War by volunteers from Kitchener's Army and formed in April 1915 as part of the K4 Army Group and taken over by the War Office on 10 August 1915. Comprising mainly infantry battalions from Yorkshire and Lancashire, the division was sent to Egypt in December 1915 before moving to France in March 1916 and spent the remainder of the First World War in action on the Western Front. The 31st Division was the quintessential New Army division, being made up entirely of Pals battalions.

The 31st Division's first major action was on the first day on the Somme (1 July 1916). The division suffered 3,600 casualties and failed to reach any of its objectives. Later it served at the Battle of the Ancre and at Oppy Wood. It took part in the defence against the German spring offensive in early 1918, and finally in the victorious battles of the Hundred Days Offensive.

== Recruitment ==
Alfred Leete's recruitment poster for Kitchener's Army.

On 6 August 1914, less than 48 hours after Britain's declaration of war, Parliament sanctioned an increase of 500,000 men for the Regular Army, and on 11 August the newly-appointed Secretary of State for War, Field Marshal Earl Kitchener of Khartoum, issued his famous call to arms: 'Your King and Country Need You', urging the first 100,000 volunteers to come forward. This group of six divisions with supporting arms became known as Kitchener's First New Army, or 'K1'. The flood of volunteers overwhelmed the ability of the army to absorb and organise them, and by the time the Fifth New Army (K5) was authorised, many of its constituent units were being organised as 'Pals battalions' under the auspices of mayors and corporations of towns up and down the country.

== Training ==
In late May and early June 1915 the units of the 31st Division began to assemble at South Camp, Ripon, where brigade training began in earnest. Musketry training was finally begun in August, and in September the division moved to Hurdcott Camp at Fovant where the division received SMLE service rifles and carried out final intensive battle training in the Salisbury Plain Training Area.

== Service ==
=== Egypt ===
On 29 November 1915 the division received warning orders to join the British Expeditionary Force in France, and advance parties set out for the embarkation ports of Folkestone and Southampton. At the last minute, the destination was changed to Egypt, the advance parties were recalled, and on 7 December the troops embarked at Devonport.

The division reached Port Said between 24 December and 23 January 1916 and went into the Suez Canal defences at Qantara. On 26 February orders arrived to reverse the process and on 1 March the division began re-embarking at Port Said. It unloaded at Marseille between 6 and 16 March and then concentrated in the Somme area as part of the BEF. It remained on the Western Front for the rest of the war.

=== Somme ===
The division was introduced to trench warfare in March in front of Beaumont-Hamel and Y Ravine. Although this was a quiet sector of the line, the troops suffered their first casualties during this short tour, mainly from German Minenwerfers (trench mortars). Shortly afterwards the 31st Division formed its own light trench mortar batteries (TMBs). It also provided working parties to assist the 252nd Tunnelling Company, Royal Engineers, digging the Hawthorn Ridge mine that was to be exploded to launch the forthcoming Battle of the Somme. Over the following weeks the battalions took their turns in the routine of trench holding, working parties, patrolling and trench raiding, with a constant drain on manpower from shelling and snipers.

The 92nd Brigade held the front line trenches during the British bombardment in the days leading up to the battle, suffering significant casualties from the German counter-bombardment. The night before the battle, working parties from the 92nd Brigade were out in No man's land cutting lanes through the British barbed wire for the assaulting troops to pass through. It then withdrew into the support trenches, to hold the front line while the other two brigades attacked on 1 July. Despite all the preparation and high hopes, the First day on the Somme was a disaster for 31st Division. 93 and 94 Brigades went 'over the top' at 07.30 on 1 July, 10 minutes after the explosion of the nearby Hawthorn Ridge mine had alerted the enemy. Their objective was the village of Serre. The advancing lines were almost annihilated by German machine guns and shellfire, and only a few parties got into the enemy front line, where they remained pinned down. The division was unable to get any support to them across the fire-swept No man's land for the rest of the day.

On 2 July the shattered division was pulled out of the line and sent north to a quiet sector for rest and refit, though there was the usual trickle of casualties associated with trench holding and raiding.

=== Ancre ===
The Somme Offensive was still going on at the end of October when the 31st Division returned to the sector for the Battle of the Ancre, which was to be the last big operation of the year. Serre had still not been taken, and the 92nd Brigade was assigned to the attack alongside 3rd Division (the rest of 31st Division was still too shattered to take part). A 48-hour preliminary bombardment began on 11 November, and the brigade moved into the trenches on the night of 12/13, along communication trenches clogged with mud. Zero hour was 05.30 on 13 November, and fog, light rain and a smokescreen reduced visibility to a few yards, so that the leading battalions initially had little difficulty, but the 3rd Division on their right made no progress. Small-scale fighting went on all day, and Private John Cunningham of the 12th East Yorks won a Victoria Cross (VC) for fighting on alone when all the rest of his team of bombers became casualties. At the end of the day the brigade had been driven back to its starting positions and suffered over 800 casualties.

The Division remained on the Ancre through the winter of 1916–17, following up the Germans when they retired to the Hindenburg Line in the Spring of 1917.

Oppy Wood, 1917. Evening by John Nash

=== Oppy Wood ===
On 8 April 1917, the division left the Ancre and moved to the Arras sector for the Arras Offensive. After a period of training and trench-holding, the division moved into assembly trenches opposite Oppy during the night of 2/3 May, under shellfire. The British creeping barrage started at 03.45 and the 92nd and 93rd Brigades set off, in the dark and mist, into severe machine gun fire from Oppy Wood. 92 Brigade was held up in No man's land and suffered severe casualties. 2nd Lieutenant Jack Harrison of the 11th East Yorks was awarded a posthumous VC.

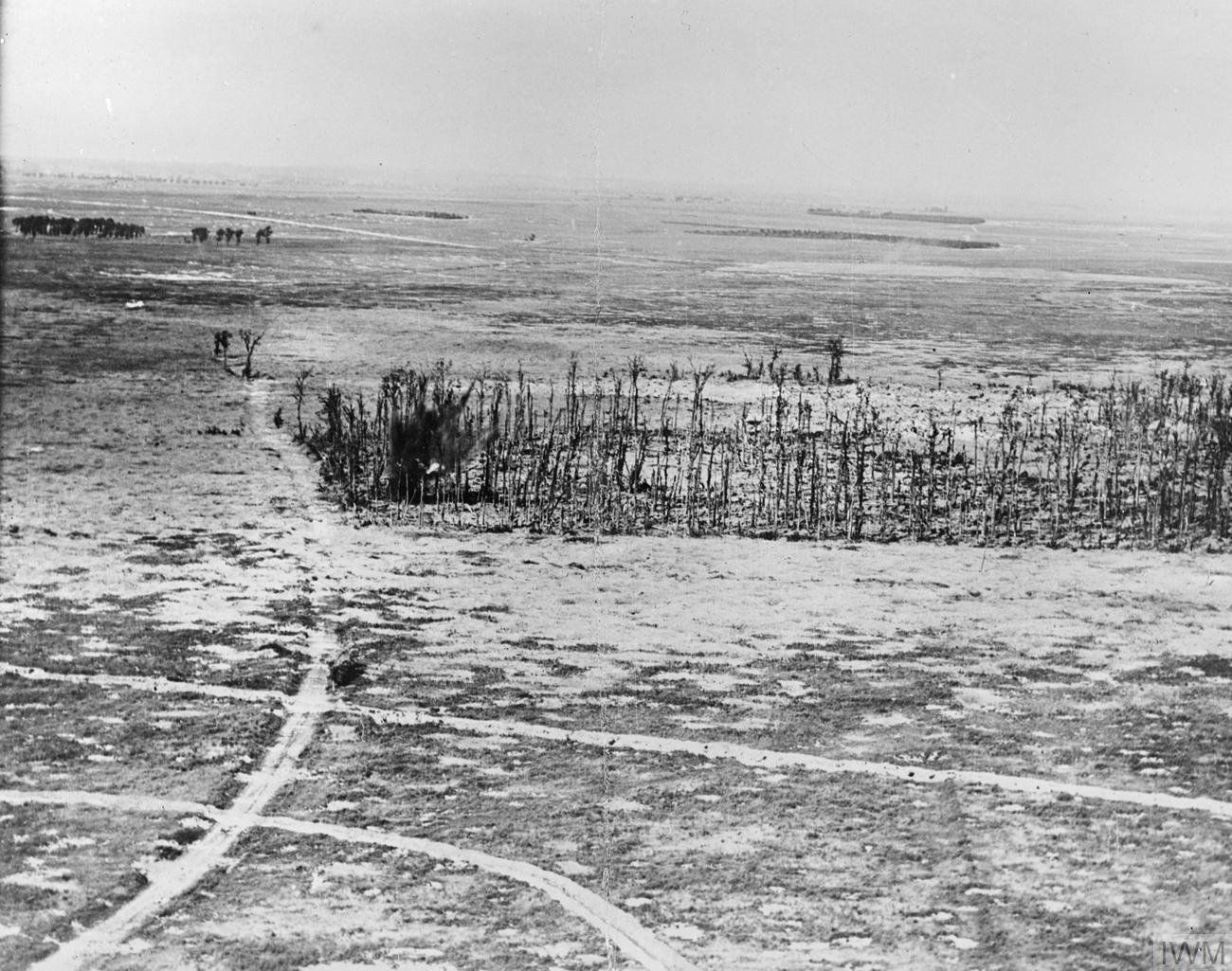
Oppy Wood from the air

Casualties in the 12th East Yorks had been so severe that it was temporarily reduced to two composite companies attached to the 10th and 11th Battalions respectively. A fresh attack on Oppy Wood was arranged for 28 June. This time the attack was to be made by the 94th Brigade with the 92nd Brigade in support. The attack was made in the evening of 28 June and successfully took the trenches, completing the Capture of Oppy Wood.

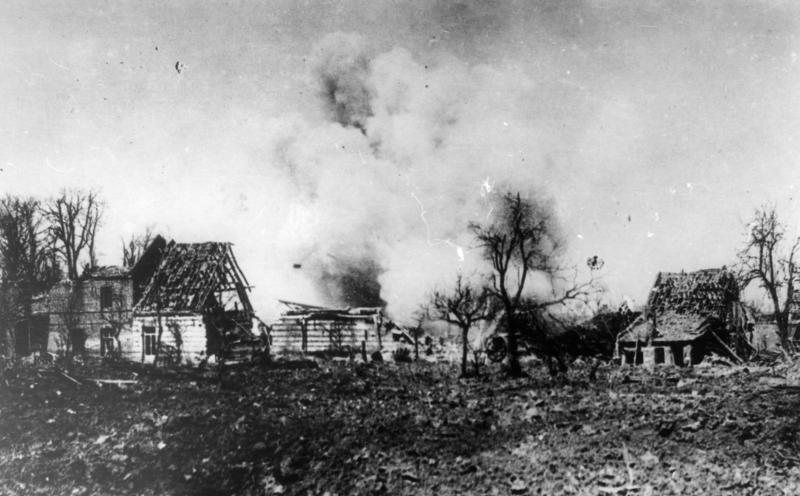
Oppy under shellfire, May 1917.

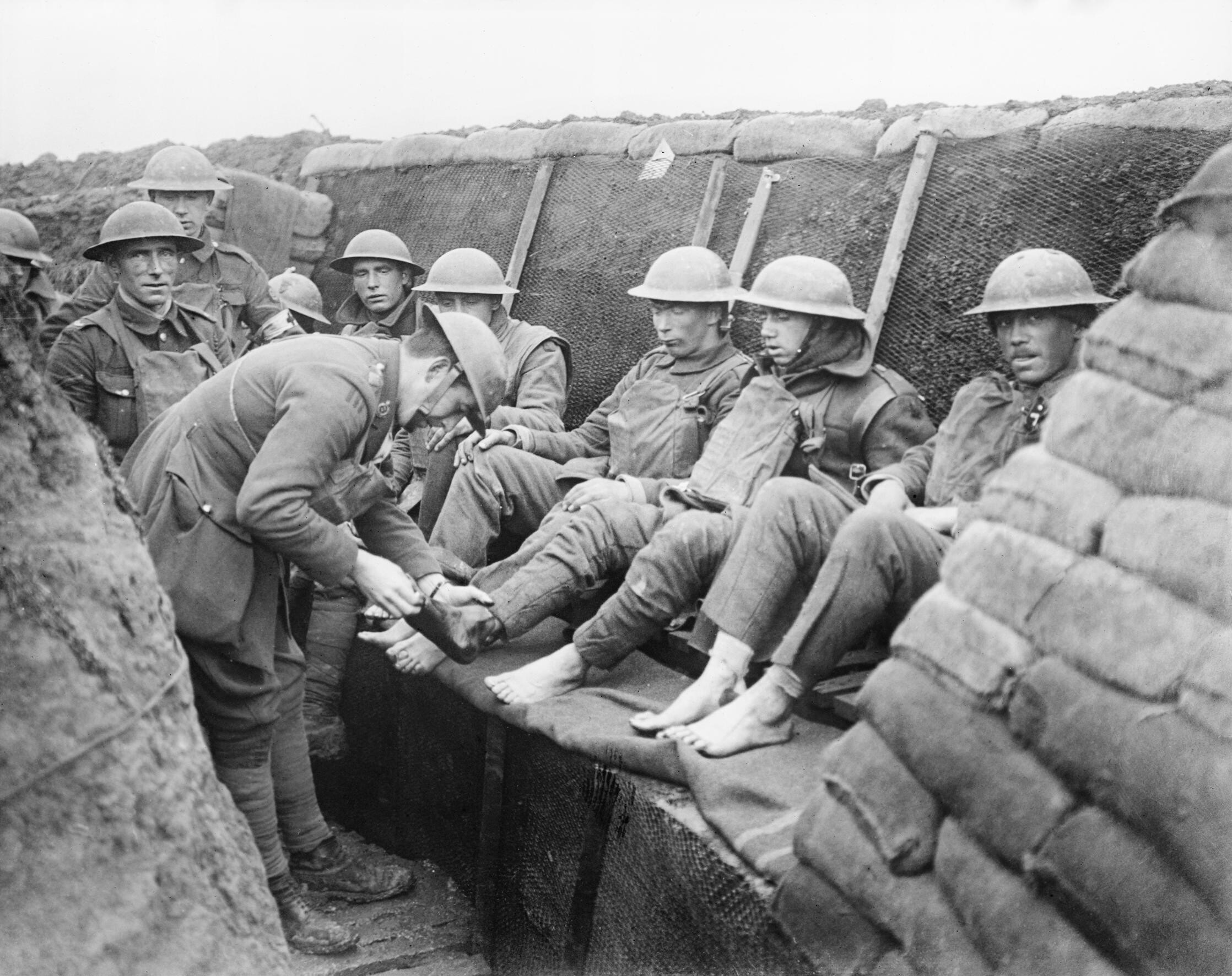
The medical officer of the 12th (Service) Battalion, East Yorkshire Regiment, conducts a foot inspection in a support trench near Roclincourt, France, 9 January 1918.

The 31st Division was not committed to the Third Ypres Offensive, which culminated in the dreadful Battle of Passchendaele, possibly because it was not considered to have recovered from its ordeal on the Somme a year before. By the beginning of 1918 the BEF was suffering a severe manpower crisis: brigades were reorganised on a three-battalion basis in February, with the surplus men being drafted to bring other units up to strength. In the 31st Division, however, this process was even more severe, with the whole of the 94th Brigade disappearing, to be replaced temporarily by the 4th Guards Brigade, and later by a reformed 94th Brigade composed of Yeomanry units recalled from Palestine.

=== Ervillers and Ayette ===
When the German spring offensive opened on 21 March 1918, 31st Division was in reserve until it was sent up on 23 March; even then the 92nd Brigade remained in reserve at Ervillers, improving the defences. Ervillers was attacked on the evening of 24 March, the defence being confused by British troops retreating from the forward defences. There was fighting in the village streets, but the next day the combined fire of 92nd Brigade and part of 42nd (East Lancashire) Division stopped the German advance. However, events elsewhere meant that the 31st and 42nd Divisions were ordered to retire on the morning of 27 March. 92 Brigade then defended Ayette aerodrome against repeated attacks until, with both flanks 'in the air', it pulled back to the partly-dug 'Purple Line' in front of Ayette village. 2nd Lieutenant Basil Horsfall of the 11th East Lancs was awarded a posthumous VC. During the night, a composite battalion of troops from the 92nd Brigade's quartermaster details arrived to take over part of the Purple Line. The division was relieved on 31 March.

=== Hazebrouck ===
While resting in the Monchy-Breton area the division received large numbers of reinforcements, mainly under the age of 19. The bombardment for the second phase of the German offensive (the Battles of the Lys) opened on 7 April, and on 11 April the division had been called forward in ex-London buses to form a defensive line near Estaires through which retreating British and Portuguese troops could withdraw. Next day the Germans threw in all their reserves to try to take Hazebrouck. Over successive days confused fighting went on, units fighting rearguards often finding their flanks left in the air and being forced to retire until on 14 April the division withdrew through a new line held by fresh Australian and British troops, who defeated the attacks and ensured the safety of Hazebrouck. A temporary 92nd Composite Battalion was formed from the 92nd Brigade to assist the Australians.

=== La Becque and Ploegsteert ===
Once out of the line the division began training for offensive operations. 31st Division took part in Operation Borderland, a limited attack on La Becque and other fortified farms in front of the Forest of Nieppe on 28 June, in what was described as 'a model operation' for artillery cooperation. Individual units continued to make small advances through aggressive patrolling and seizing strongpoints (so-called 'peaceful penetration') until the Allies began a coordinated offensive in August. The division captured Vieux-Berquin on 13 August 1918 and pushed forward until running into serious opposition south of Ploegsteert on 21 August, where fighting continued into September.

A formal attack was arranged for the morning of 28 September (the opening day of the Fifth Battle of Ypres). Although suffering heavy casualties, the 92nd Brigade and a battalion from the 93rd Brigade took their objectives, though they were shelled out part of Ploegsteert Wood. The rest of the 93rd Brigade then crossed the Douve stream accompanied by artillery and engineers, the 94th (Yeomanry) Brigade was held up the rear). The general retirement of the Germans along the whole line then allowed the division to push on through Ploegsteert Wood and advance up to the River Lys on 3 October.

=== Pursuit ===
Returning to the line on 12 October, patrols from the 92nd Brigade slipped across the Lys on a raft during the night of 14/15 October and established posts on the far bank. The following afternoon further parties crossed and advanced under a barrage to the Deûlémont–Warneton road. The brigade continued the advance on 16 and 17 October, liberating several villages. By 18 October the battalions were advancing in company columns screened by XV Corps cyclist battalion, leap-frogging forward to liberate Tourcoing. Pressure was kept up through 19 and 20 October, until the brigade was squeezed out of the advancing line between Second Army and Fifth Army and went into support, while the 93rd Brigade held the junction between the two armies and continued up to the Scheldt.

The division was back in the line from 28 October, with the 92nd Brigade in the lead continuing to advance slowly against machine gun and shell fire, from rearguards who 'did not appear disposed to give ground'. The division then made an attack at Tieghem on 31 October 1918 that was so successful that the 92 Brigade in reserve was not required while the 94th (Yeomanry) Brigade drove the enemy behind the Scheldt.

The 31st Division returned to the line on the night of 6/7 November, crossing the Scheldt and sending forward the 11th East Yorks as part of a pursuit force including a field artillery battery and companies from the divisional machine gun battalion, the Motor Machine Gun Corps and XIX Corps cyclists. When the Armistice with Germany came into force on 11 November, the 11th East Lancs were leading the division, and scouts reported that there were no enemy in front.

== Disbandment ==
The division began to pull back on 13 November, and by the end of the month was established in camps south of St-Omer and engaged in road repair. Demobilisation (chiefly of coal miners) began on 11 December and proceeded at a steadily increasing rate during January 1919. On 29 January the two East Yorks Battalions were sent by rail to Calais to deal with possible riots by men working in the Ordnance depot. Demobilisation accelerated in February and by April the battalions had been reduced to cadres, which left for England on 22 May. During the war the division's casualties amounted to 30,091 killed, wounded, and missing.

== Order of Battle ==
The composition of the division was as follows:

92nd Brigade

- 10th (Service) Battalion (1st Hull), East Yorkshire Regiment
- 11th (Service) Battalion (2nd Hull), East Yorkshire Regiment
- 12th (Service) Battalion (3rd Hull), East Yorkshire Regiment – disbanded February 1918
- 13th (Service) Battalion (4th Hull), East Yorkshire Regiment – disbanded February 1918
- 11th (Service) Battalion (Accrington), East Lancashire Regiment – from 94th Brigade February 1918
- 92/1 and 92/2 Light Trench Mortar Batteries (TMBs) – formed by 11 April 1916, merged as 92nd TMB 12 June 1916
- 92nd Brigade Machine Gun Company – joined on 20 May 1916, to No 31 Battalion Machine Gun Corps (MGC) 3 March 1918

93rd Brigade

- 15th (Service) Battalion (1st Leeds), Prince of Wales's Own (West Yorkshire Regiment)
- 16th (Service) Battalion (1st Bradford), Prince of Wales's Own (West Yorkshire Regiment) – disbanded February 1918
- 18th (Service) Battalion (2nd Bradford), Prince of Wales's Own (West Yorkshire Regiment) – disbanded February 1918
- 18th (Service) Battalion (1st County), Durham Light Infantry
- 13th (Service) Battalion, York and Lancaster Regiment (1st Barnsley) – from 94th Brigade February 1918
- 93/1 and 93/2 Light TMBs – formed by 12 April 1916, merged as 93rd TMB 12 June 1916
- 93rd Brigade Machine Gun Company – joined on 20 May 1916, to No 31 Battalion MGC 3 March 1918

In April 1918 heavy casualties led to the brief amalgamation of the 92nd and 93rd brigades into the 92nd Composite Brigade

94th Brigade

- 11th (Service) Battalion (Accrington), East Lancashire Regiment – to 92nd Brigade February 1918
- 12th (Service) Battalion, York and Lancaster Regiment (Sheffield) – disbanded February 1918
- 13th (Service) Battalion, York and Lancaster Regiment (1st Barnsley) – to 93rd Brigade February 1918
- 14th (Service) Battalion, York and Lancaster Regiment (2nd Barnsley)– disbanded February 1918)
- 2nd Battalion, Royal Munster Fusiliers – from May 1918 to June 1918
- 94/1 and 94/2 Light TMBs – formed by 12 April 1916, merged as 94th TMB 14 June 1916, to 4th Gds Bde 12 February 1918
- 94th Brigade Machine Gun Company – joined on 21 May 1916, to 4th Gds Bde 11 February 1918

The brigade was disbanded in February 1918 then began reforming in May. In June it was brought up to strength with the addition of Yeomanry battalions from the 74th (Yeomanry) Division and renamed the 94th (Yeomanry) Brigade

- 12th (Norfolk Yeomanry) Battalion, Norfolk Regiment
- 12th (Ayr and Lanark Yeomanry) Battalion, Royal Scots Fusiliers
- 24th (Denbighshire Yeomanry) Battalion, Royal Welch Fusiliers
- 94th TMB – reformed 29 June 1918

4th Guards Brigade

This brigade was attached to the division during February 1918 following the breakup of the 94th Brigade. It left when the 94th Brigade began reforming in May.

- 4th Battalion, Grenadier Guards
- 3rd Battalion, Coldstream Guards
- 2nd Battalion, Irish Guards
- 94th TMB – attached 12 February 1918
- 4th Gds TMB – took over 19 March 1918
- 94th MG Co – attached 11 February 1918, to No 31 Battalion MGC 3 March 1918

Divisional Mounted Troops

- HQ, Machine Gun Section and B Squadron, 1/Lancashire Hussars – joined 27 November 1915; left on 9 May 1916
- 31st Divisional Cyclist Company – formed by 13 August 1915; joined VIII Corps Cyclist Battalion, Army Cyclist Corps, 9 May 1916

Divisional Royal Artillery

The artillery originally assigned to the division was as follows (all batteries comprised four 18-pounder guns or 4.5-inch howitzers):

- CLV (West Yorkshire) Brigade, Royal Field Artillery (RFA) – A, B, C, D Batteries and Brigade Ammunition Column (BAC)
- CLXI (Yorkshire) Brigade, RFA – A, B, C, D Batteries and BAC
- CLXIV (Huddersfield) (Howitzer) Brigade, RFA – A (H), B (H), C (H), D (H) Batteries and BAC
- CLXVIII (Rotherham) Brigade, RFA – A, B, C, D Batteries and BAC
- 31st (Hull) Divisional Ammunition Column, RFA
- 124th (2nd Hull) Heavy Battery, Royal Garrison Artillery

When 31st Division embarked for Egypt, the divisional artillery (DA) did not accompany it. Instead, 32nd Division Artillery was attached to 31st Division, and served with it for the rest of the war. (31st DA later joined 32nd Division in France). The 2nd County Palatine Artillery was originally raised in Lancashire by the Earl of Derby:

- CLXV (2nd County Palatine) Brigade, RFA – A, B, C, D Batteries and BAC
- CLXIX (2nd County Palatine) Brigade, RFA – A, B, C, D Batteries and BAC
- CLXX (2nd County Palatine) Brigade, RFA – A, B, C, D Batteries and BAC
- CLXXI (2nd County Palatine) (Howitzer) Brigade, RFA – A (H), B (H), C (H), D (H) Batteries and BAC
- 32nd Divisional Ammunition Column, RFA – formed at Heytesbury 10 September 1915

On arrival in France the divisional artillery was reorganised:

- CLXV – D Bty left and A (H)/CLXXI Bty became D (H) Bty on 2 May 1916
- CLXIX – D Bty left and B (H)/CLXXI Bty became D (H) Bty on 2 May 1916
- CLXX – D Bty left and C (H)/CLXXI Bty became D (H) Bty on 2 May 1916
- CLXXI – D/CLXV, D/CLXIX, and D/CLXX Btys joined and became A, B, and C; D (H) Bty remained
- V.31 Heavy Trench Mortar Bty joined 4 June 1916
- X.31, Y.31 and Z.31 Medium Trench Mortar Btys formed 31 March 1916

The BACs were absorbed by the DAC on 2 May 1916

Further reorganisation of 31st DA occurred in August 1916 when CLXXI Brigade was broken up and the 18-pounder batteries were brought up to six guns:

- CLXV – A + 1 section A/CLXXI, B + 1 section A/CLXXI, C + 1 Section B/CLXXI, D (H) remained 4 howitzers
- CLXIX – A + 1 section C, B + 1 section C, D (H)/CLXXI joined as C (H), D (H) remained 4 howitzers; 517 (H) Bty (4 howitzers) joined from UK on 20 November
- CLXX – A + 1 section C/CLXXI, B + 1 section C/CLXXI, C + 1 section B/CLXXI, D (H) remained 4 howitzers

CLXIX Brigade was broken up in January 1917: sections of D (H) Bty brought D (H)/CLXV and D (H)/CLXX up to six howitzers each, the remainder was distributed to various Army field brigades. V.31 Heavy and Z.31 Medium TMBs were broken up in February 1918.

Divisional Royal Engineers

- 210th (Leeds) Field Company, Royal Engineers (RE)
- 211th (Leeds) Field Company, RE
- 223rd (Leeds) Field Company, RE
- 31st (Leeds) Divisional Signal Company, RE

Divisional Pioneers

- 12th (Service) Battalion, King's Own Yorkshire Light Infantry (Miners)

Divisional Machine Gun Troops

- No 31 Battalion, MGC – formed 3 March 1918
  - 92nd, 93rd, 94th MG Companies – transferred from brigades
  - 243rd MG Company – joined 18 July 1917

Divisional Medical Services

- 93rd, 94th, 95th Field Ambulances, Royal Army Medical Corps (RAMC) – joined from original 31st Division
- 41st Mobile Veterinary Section, Army Veterinary Corps

Divisional Transport

- 31st Divisional Train, Army Service Corps
  - 217th, 218th, 219th and 220th Companies – joined 52nd (Lowland) Division in Egypt
  - 221st, 222nd, 223rd Companies – joined in France from 32nd Division
  - 279th Company – joined in France from Royal Naval Division

Divisional Labour Troops

- 228th Divisional Employment Company, Labour Corps – formed by 9 June 1917

== Commanders ==
The following officers commanded the division:

- Maj-Gen Edward Fanshawe from 26 July 1915
- Brig-Gen Edward Hogarth Molesworth (acting) from 16 August 1915
- Maj-Gen Robert Wanless O'Gowan from 24 August 1915
- Maj-Gen Robert James Bridgford from 21 March 1918
- Maj-Gen J. Campbell from 6 May 1918

== Battle Insignia ==
The practice of wearing battalion specific insignia (often called battle patches) in the B.E.F. began in mid 1915 with the arrival of units of Kitchener's Armies and was widespread after the Somme Battles of 1916. The patches shown were adopted by the division during late 1917, and were designed to a brigade scheme including a brigade sign worn by all ranks on the back, below the collar. Those signs for the 92nd and 93rd brigades indicated the battalion seniority, all brigades wore their battalion, M.G. company and T.M. battery signs at the top of both sleeves.

| Top: the brigade sign. Middle, from left to right, 10th, 11th, 12th, and 13th (Service) Battalions East Yorkshire Regiment. Bottom row: 92nd machine gun company M.G.C. |
| Top: the brigade sign. Middle, from left to right, 15th, 16th and 18th (Service) Battalions West Yorkshire Regiment, 18th (Service) Battalion Durham Light Infantry. Bottom row: 93rd machine gun company M.G.C. |
| Top: the brigade sign. Middle, from left to right, 11th East Lancashire Regiment, 12th, 13th, and 14th (Service) Battalions York and Lancaster Regiment. Bottom row: 94th machine gun company M.G.C. and 94th trench mortar battery. |
| 12th (Service) Battalion King's Own Yorkshire Light Infantry, the division pioneers. |

== See also ==
- List of British divisions in World War I

== Bibliography ==
- Becke, Archibald F. (1945). Order of Battle of Divisions Part 3B. New Army Divisions (30-41) & 63rd (R.N.) Division. London: HMSO. OCLC 4405016.
- David Bilton, Hull Pals, 10th, 11th 12th and 13th Battalions East Yorkshire Regiment – A History of 92 Infantry Brigade, 31st Division, Barnsley: Pen & Sword, 2014, ISBN 978-1-78346-185-1.
- Chappell, Mike (1986). British Battle Insignia (1). 1914–18. Oxford: Osprey Publishing. ISBN 9780850457278.
- Brig-Gen Sir James E. Edmonds, History of the Great War: Military Operations, France and Belgium, 1916, Vol I, London: Macmillan,1932/Woking: Shearer, 1986, ISBN 0-946998-02-7.
- Hibbard, Mike; Gibbs, Gary (2016). Infantry Divisions, Identification Schemes 1917 (1 ed.). Wokingham: The Military History Society.
- Jack Horsfall & Nigel Cave, Battleground Europe: Somme: Serre, Barnsley: Pen & Sword, 1996, ISBN 0-85052-508-X.
- Andrew Jackson, Accrington's Pals: The Full Story, Barnsley, Pen & Sword, 2013, ISBN 978-1-84884-469-8.
- Peter H. Liddle (ed), Passchendaele in Perspective: The Third Battle of Ypres, London: Leo Cooper, 1997, ISBN 0-85052-552-7.
- Martin Middlebrook, The First Day on the Somme, 1 July 1916, London: Allen Lane 1971/Fontana, 1975.
