= John Cunningham (VC 1916) =

Recipient of the Victoria Cross

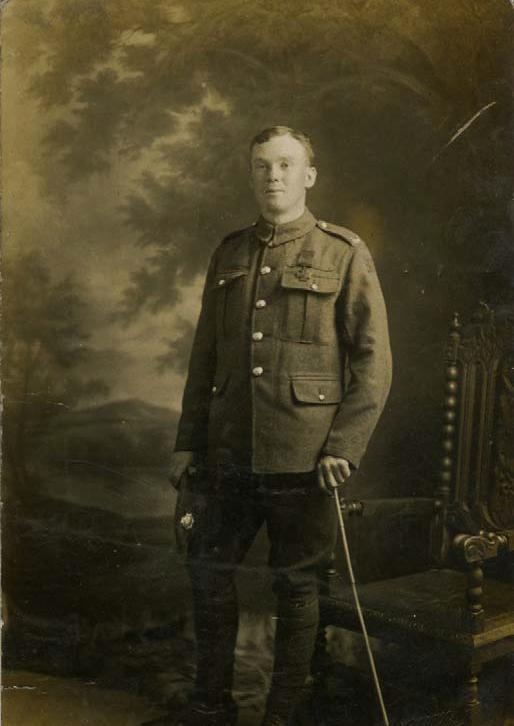
- Born: 28 June 1897; Scunthorpe, Lincolnshire, England
- Died: 21 February 1941 (aged 43); Kingston upon Hull, East Riding of Yorkshire, England
- Burial place: Western Cemetery, Hull
- Military career
- Allegiance: United Kingdom
- Branch: British Army
- Rank: Private
- Units: East Yorkshire Regiment
- Conflicts: World War I
- Awards: Victoria Cross

Private John Cunningham VC (28 June 1897 – 21 February 1941) was a British Army soldier and an English recipient of the Victoria Cross (VC), the highest and most prestigious award for gallantry in the face of the enemy that can be awarded to British and Commonwealth forces. John was born in Swains Yard off Manley Street, Scunthorpe and was the eldest son of Charles and Mary Cunningham.

Cunningham was from an English Gypsy background.

Cunningham was 19 years old, and a private in the 12th (Service) Battalion (the 'Hull Sportsmen'), a Pals battalion of the East Yorkshire Regiment in 31st Division during World War I, when the following deed took place for which he was awarded the VC.

On 13 November 1916, the opening day of the Battle of the Ancre (the final offensive of the Battle of the Somme), attacking from opposite Hebuterne the 31st Division was to seize the German trenches and form a defensive flank north of Serre. After the enemy's front line had been captured, Private Cunningham went with a bombing section up a communication trench where much opposition was met and all the rest of the section were either killed or wounded. Collecting all the bombs from the casualties Private Cunningham went on alone and when he had used up all the bombs he had he returned for a fresh supply and again went up the communication trench where he met a party of 10 Germans. He killed all 10 and cleared the trench up to the new line.

His Victoria Cross is displayed at York Army Museum, England.

John was married to Eva Harrison in June 1917 at Hull and had two children, Annie who died in infancy and John who was born in 1920 at Hull. John Cunningham died 20 February 1941 at 5 Beaufort Terrace Campbell Street Hull aged 43 years and his funeral took place in Hull on 24 February 1941, John is buried in grave No: 17509, compartment No; 180 at the Western Cemetery, Kingston upon Hull.
