= Ayette =

- Commune
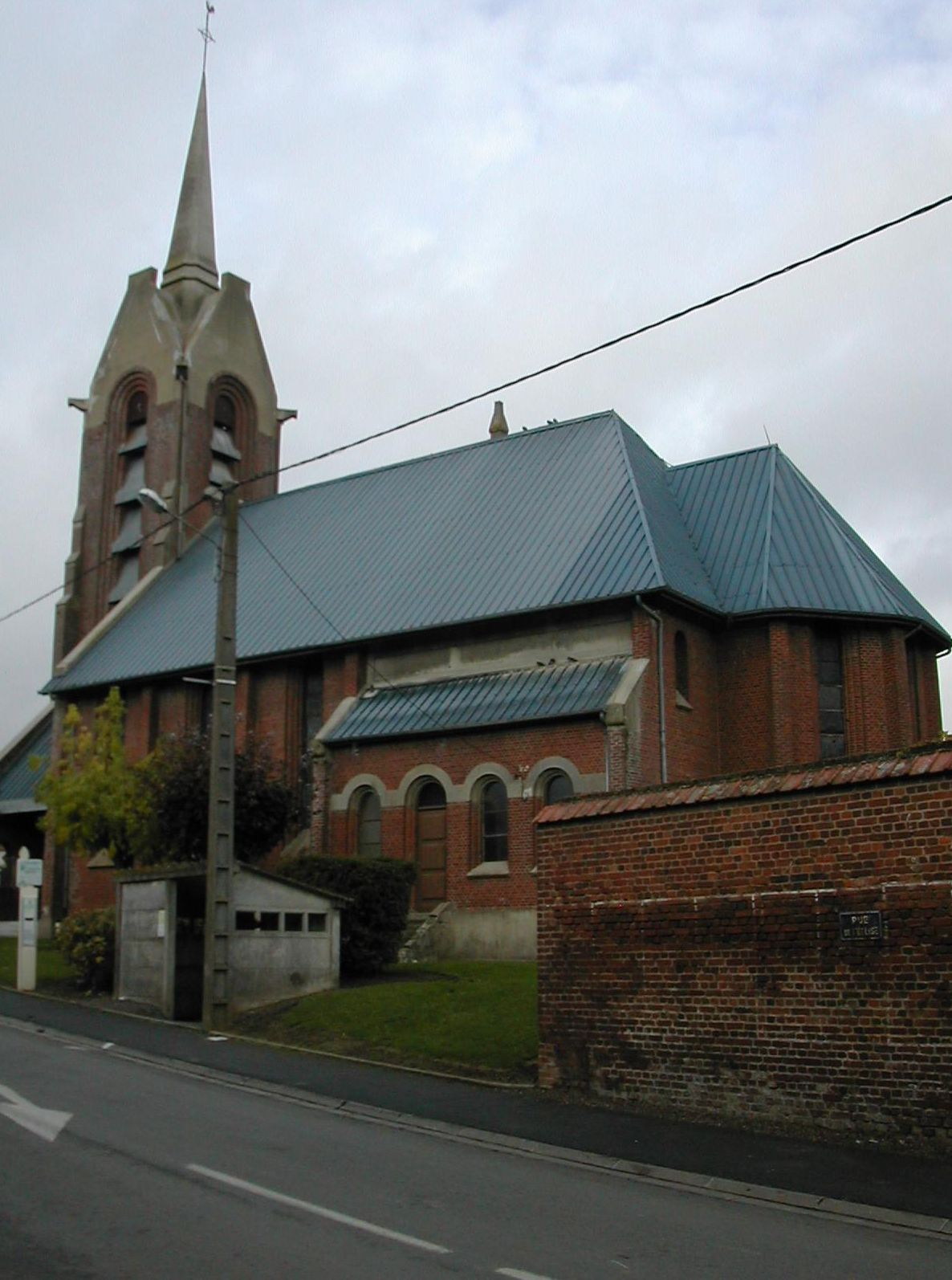
- The church of Ayette

- Coat of arms
- Location of Ayette
- Location within France Location within Hauts-de-France
- Coordinates: 50°10′30″N 2°44′02″E
- Country: France
- Region: Hauts-de-France
- Department: Pas-de-Calais
- Arrondissement: Arras
- Canton: Bapaume
- Intercommunality: CC du Sud-Artois

Government
  - Mayor (2020–2026): Fabien Tamayo
- Area^{1}: 5.15 km^{2} (1.99 sq mi)
- Elevation: 102 m (335 ft)
- Highest elevation: 139 m (456 ft)
- Lowest elevation: 97 m (318 ft)
- Population (2023): 330
  - Density: 64/km^{2} (170/sq mi)
- Time zone: UTC+01:00 (CET)
  - Summer (DST): UTC+02:00 (CEST)
- INSEE/Postal code: 62068 /62116
- ^{1} French Land Register data, which excludes lakes, ponds, glaciers > 1 km^{2} (0.386 sq mi or 247 acres) and river estuaries.

Ayette (French pronunciation: [ajɛt]) is a commune in the Pas-de-Calais department in northern France.

== Geography ==
A farming village located 9 miles (14 km) south of Arras at the junction of the D7 and D919 roads.

== Population ==
Historical population
Year	Pop.	±% p.a.
1968	351	—
1975	336	−0.62%
1982	306	−1.33%
1990	335	+1.14%
1999	336	+0.03%
2007	326	−0.38%
2012	333	+0.43%
2017	324	−0.55%
2023	330	+0.31%
Source: INSEE

== Sights ==
- L'Église Sainte-Libaire, rebuilt after 1918, along with the rest of the village.
- The CWGC maintains two cemeteries: The British Cemetery and the Indian and Chinese cemetery. There is also a British Cemetery in Douchy-lès-Ayette, about a kilometer to the west.

== See also ==
- Communes of the Pas-de-Calais department
