= Vieux-Berquin =

- Commune
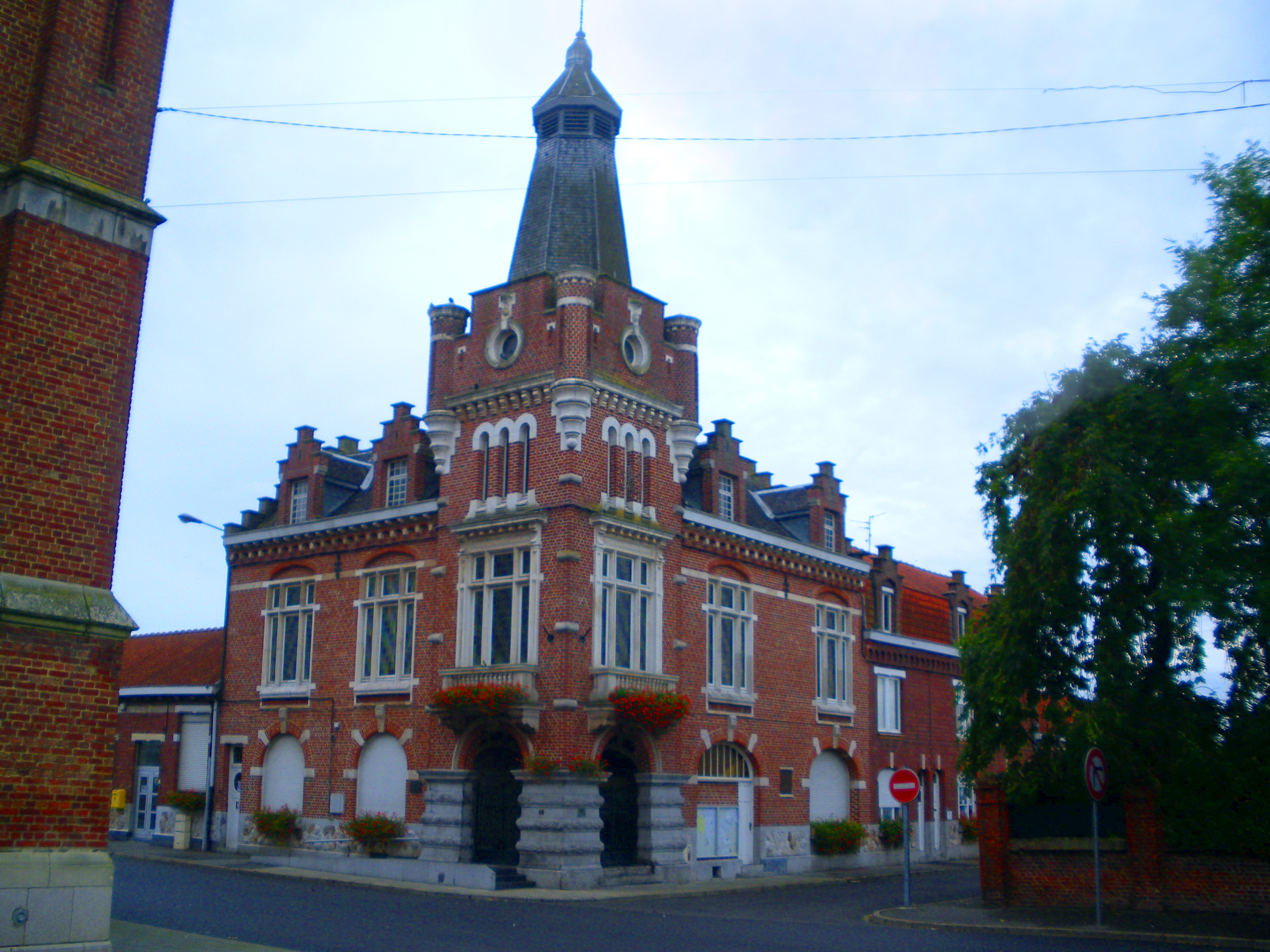
- The town hall in Vieux-Berquin

- Coat of arms
- Location of Vieux-Berquin
- Location within France Location within Hauts-de-France
- Coordinates: 50°41′44″N 2°38′43″E
- Country: France
- Region: Hauts-de-France
- Department: Nord
- Arrondissement: Dunkerque
- Canton: Bailleul
- Intercommunality: CA Cœur de Flandre

Government
  - Mayor (2023–2026): Pierre-Louis Ruyant
- Area^{1}: 25.96 km^{2} (10.02 sq mi)
- Elevation: 20 m (66 ft)
- Highest elevation: 20 m (66 ft)
- Lowest elevation: 15 m (49 ft)
- Population (2023): 2,628
  - Density: 101.2/km^{2} (262.2/sq mi)
- Demonym: Vieux-Berquinois(es)
- Time zone: UTC+01:00 (CET)
  - Summer (DST): UTC+02:00 (CEST)
- INSEE/Postal code: 59615 /59232
- ^{1} French Land Register data, which excludes lakes, ponds, glaciers > 1 km^{2} (0.386 sq mi or 247 acres) and river estuaries.

Vieux-Berquin (French pronunciation: [vjø bɛʁkɛ̃]; Dutch: Oud-Berkijn) is a commune in the Nord department in northern France.

== Population ==
Historical population
Year	Pop.	±% p.a.
1968	1,864	—
1975	1,759	−0.82%
1982	1,949	+1.48%
1990	2,092	+0.89%
1999	2,185	+0.48%
2007	2,290	+0.59%
2012	2,499	+1.76%
2017	2,507	+0.06%
2023	2,628	+0.79%
Source: INSEE

== Heraldry ==
Arms of Vieux-Berquin	The arms of Vieux-Berquin are blazoned : Or, 5 bendlets gules. (Hallennes-lez-Haubourdin and Vieux-Berquin use the same arms.)

== See also ==
- Communes of the Nord department
