= Beerbohm =

Beerbohm is a surname. Notable people with the surname include:

- Constance Beerbohm, oldest daughter of Julius Ewald Edward Beerbohm (1811–1892)
- Elisabeth Jungmann, Lady Beerbohm (1894–1958), interpreter and the secretary, literary executor
- Felicity Beerbohm Tree, Lady Cory-Wright (1895–1978), daughter of Herbert
- Florence Kahn, Lady Beerbohm
- Sir Herbert Beerbohm Tree, born Herbert Draper Beerbohm (1852–1917), English actor and manager
- Julius Beerbohm (1854–1906), travel-writer, engineer and explorer, son of Julius Ewald Edward Beerbohm
- Lyle Beerbohm, American professional mixed martial artist
- Sir (Henry Maximilian) "Max" Beerbohm (1872–1956), English parodist and caricaturist

== See also ==
- Beerbohm family
- Bierbaum
