= Tree (surname) =

Tree is the surname of:

- Lady Anne Tree (1927–2010), British philanthropist and prison visitor
- David Tree (1915–2009), English actor, grandson of Herbert
- Dolly Tree (1899–1962), British costume designer
- Dorothy Tree (1906–1992), American actress, voice teacher, and writer
- Felicity Tree (1894–1978) English baronetess and high society figure and daughter of Herbert
- Herbert Beerbohm Tree (1852–1917), British actor
- Iris Tree (1897–1968), English poet and actress, daughter of Herbert
- Isabella Tree, Lady Burrell (born 1964), British author and conservationist
- Jeremy Tree (1925–1993), British racehorse trainer, son of Ronald
- Michael Tree (1934–2018), American violist
- Oliver Tree (1993–2026), American singer, record producer, director and comedian
- Penelope Tree (born 1950), English fashion model, daughter of Ronald
- Ronald Tree (1897–1976), British journalist, investor, and member of parliament
- Ronald James Tree (1914–1970), Welsh priest and teacher
- Ron Tree (born 1963), English musician and songwriter
- Viola Tree (1884–1938), English actress, singer, playwright and author and daughter of Herbert
