= Carol Reed =

English film director (1906–1976)

Sir Carol Reed
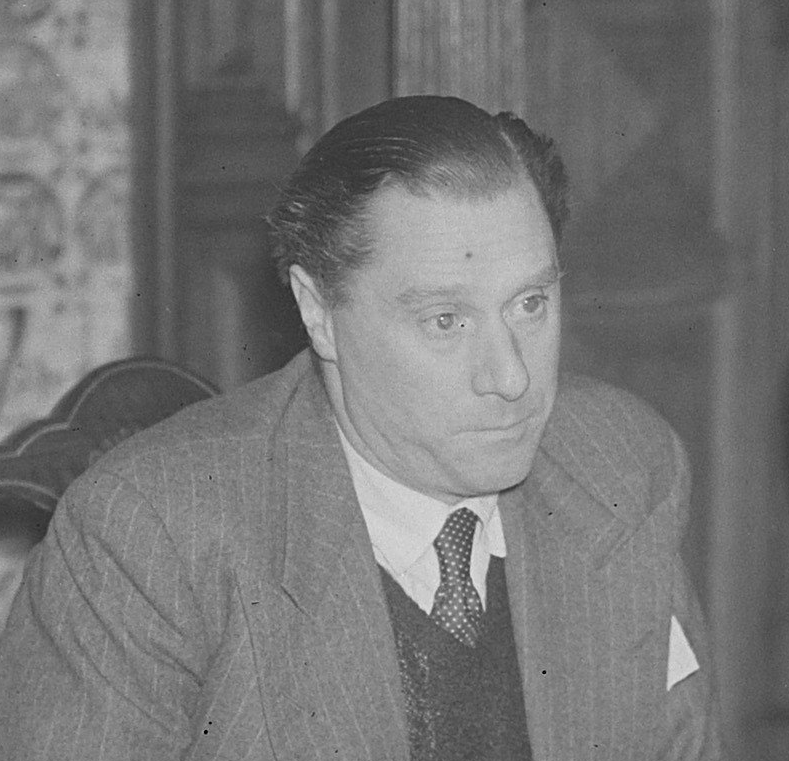
- Born: 30 December 1906; London, England
- Died: 25 April 1976 (aged 69); London, England
- Education: The King's School, Canterbury
- Occupations: Film director; producer
- Years active: 1935–1972
- Spouses: Diana Wynyard (m. 1943; div. 1947) Penelope Dudley-Ward (m. 1948)
- Children: 1
- Parent: Herbert Beerbohm Tree (father)
- Relatives: Viola Tree (half-sister); Felicity Tree (half-sister); Iris Tree (half-sister); Oliver Reed (nephew); Simon Reed (nephew); Julius Beerbohm (uncle); Max Beerbohm (uncle); Constance Beerbohm (aunt)
- Awards: See below

Sir Carol Reed (30 December 1906 – 25 April 1976) was an English film director and producer. Considered one of the foremost British filmmakers of the post-World War II era, he achieved prominence in the late 1940s for his film noir thrillers Odd Man Out (1947), The Fallen Idol (1948), and The Third Man (1949). Odd Man Out was the first recipient of the BAFTA Award for Best British Film. The Fallen Idol won the second BAFTA Award for Best British Film. The British Film Institute voted The Third Man the greatest British film of the 20th century.

Reed's subsequent work crossed a variety of genres, including the Cold War satire Our Man in Havana (1959), the Michelangelo biopic The Agony and the Ecstasy (1965), and the musical Oliver! (1968). The latter film earned Reed the Academy Award for Best Director, with two previous nominations for The Fallen Idol and The Third Man.

In 1952, he became only the second British film director to be knighted for his craft. According to Screenonline, "for that brief time in the late 1940s Carol Reed was perhaps what some earlier critics had claimed him to be: the greatest director in the world."

== Early life and career ==
Carol Reed was born in Putney, southwest London. He was the son of actor-producer Sir Herbert Beerbohm Tree and his mistress, Beatrice May Pinney, who later adopted the surname of Reed. He was educated at The King's School, Canterbury.

He embarked on an acting career while still in his late teens. A period in the theatrical company of the thriller writer Edgar Wallace followed, and Reed became his personal assistant in 1927. Apart from acting in a few Wallace-derived films himself, Reed became involved in adapting his work for the screen during the day while he was a stage manager in the evenings. This connection ended when Wallace died in February 1932. Taken on by Basil Dean, Reed worked for his Associated Talking Pictures, successively for ATP as a dialogue director, second-unit director and then assistant director. His films in the later role working under Dean were Autumn Crocus, Lorna Doone and Loyalties and (with Thorold Dickinson) Java Head.

== Early films ==
His earliest films as director were "quota quickies". Of his experience making Midshipman Easy (1935) his first solo directorial project he was harsh on himself. "I was indefinite and indecisive", he said later. "I thought I had picked up a lot about cutting and camera angles, but now, when I had to make all the decisions myself and was not just mentally approving or criticising what somebody else decided, I was pretty much lost. Fortunately, I realised that this was the only way to learn – by making mistakes." Graham Greene, then reviewing films for The Spectator, was much more forgiving, commenting that Reed "has more sense of the cinema than most veteran British directors". Of Reed's comedy Laburnum Grove (1936), he wrote: "Here at last is an English film one can unreservedly praise". He was perceptive about Reed's potential, describing the film as "thoroughly workmanlike and unpretentious, with just the hint of a personal manner which makes one believe that Mr. Reed, when he gets the right script, will prove far more than efficient."

Reed's career began to develop with The Stars Look Down (1940), from the A. J. Cronin novel, which features Michael Redgrave in the lead role. Greene wrote that Reed "has at last had his chance and magnificently taken it." He observed that "one forgets the casting altogether: he [Reed] handles his players like a master, so that one remembers them only as people."

== War years ==
The scripts of several of Reed's films in this period were written by Frank Launder and Sidney Gilliat, with the screenwriters and director working for producer Edward Black, who released through the British subsidiary of 20th Century Fox. The best known of these films are probably Night Train to Munich (1940), with Rex Harrison; Kipps (1941), again with Michael Redgrave; and The Young Mr. Pitt (1942), with Robert Donat in the title role, set during the French Revolutionary and Napoleonic Wars.

From 1942, Reed served in the Royal Army Ordnance Corps: he was granted the rank of Captain and placed with the film unit, and then with the Directorate of Army Psychiatry. For the latter body a training film, The New Lot (1943), was made, recounting the experiences of five new recruits. It had a script by Eric Ambler and Peter Ustinov, with contributions from Reed, and was produced by Thorold Dickinson. It was remade as The Way Ahead (1944).

== Post-war ==
Reed made his three most highly regarded films just after the war, beginning with Odd Man Out (1947), with James Mason in the lead. It is the tale of an injured IRA leader's last hours in an unidentified Northern Irish city. In fact, Belfast was used for the location work, but it remains unnamed in the film. Filmmaker Roman Polanski has repeatedly cited it as his favourite film.

It was the producer Alexander Korda, to whom Reed was now signed, who introduced the director to the novelist Graham Greene. The next two films were made from screenplays by Greene: The Fallen Idol (1948) and The Third Man (1949).

The Third Man was co-produced by David O. Selznick and Korda, with the American actors Orson Welles and Joseph Cotten in two of the leading roles. Reed insisted on casting Welles as Harry Lime, although Selznick had wanted Noël Coward for the role. The film required six weeks of location work in Vienna, during which Reed by chance discovered Anton Karas, the zither player who became responsible for the film's music, in a courtyard outside a small Viennese restaurant.

Reed once said: "A picture should end as it has to. I don't think anything in life ends 'right'". While Greene wanted Holly Martins (Cotten) and Anna Schmidt (Alida Valli) to reconcile at the end of the film, after Lime, her lover, is killed by Martins, Reed insisted that Anna should ignore him and walk on. "The whole point of the Valli character in that film is that she'd experienced a fatal love – and then comes along this silly American!"

According to the film critic Derek Malcolm, The Third Man is the "best film noir ever made out of Britain". The film won the Grand Prix at the Cannes Film Festival, the predecessor of the Palme d'Or.

== Later career ==
Outcast of the Islands (1952), based on a novel by Joseph Conrad, is considered by some to mark the start of his creative decline. The Man Between (1953) is dismissed as a rehash of The Third Man. It "makes no startling impact, such as we have learned to expect from its director, on either the mind or the heart", complained Virginia Graham in The Spectator. While the fable A Kid for Two Farthings (1955), Reed's first colour film, set in the East End of London, has been claimed as one of very few authentic cinematic depictions of an Anglo-Jewish community, it suffers from the stereotyping of Jews and is no more than a "whimsical curiosity" according to Michael Brooke. It was the last film Reed made for Korda's London Films; the producer died at the beginning of 1956.

Trapeze (1956) was Reed's first venture into the then relatively new CinemaScope wide screen process, and, although largely shot in Paris, was made for the US Hecht-Hill-Lancaster Productions company and was a success at the box-office. Reed was going to make Summer of the Seventeenth Doll for that company but withdrew after the budget was cut.

Our Man in Havana (1959) reunited him with Graham Greene who adapted his own novel.

He was contracted to direct a remake of Mutiny on the Bounty (1962) by MGM, but then Marlon Brando was cast as Fletcher Christian, and problems with the mock Bounty and the weather at the locations caused delays. Brando had insisted on creative control, and the two men argued incessantly. Reed left at a relatively early stage of production and was replaced by Lewis Milestone. The Agony and the Ecstasy (1965), made in the United States, was a box-office failure, and was the last film over which Reed also served as producer. Oliver! (1968), made at Shepperton in Surrey, was financially backed by Columbia, and won the Academy Award for Best Director. "The movie may have been over-produced but it seemed everyone liked it that way", writes Thomas Hischak.

== Honours ==
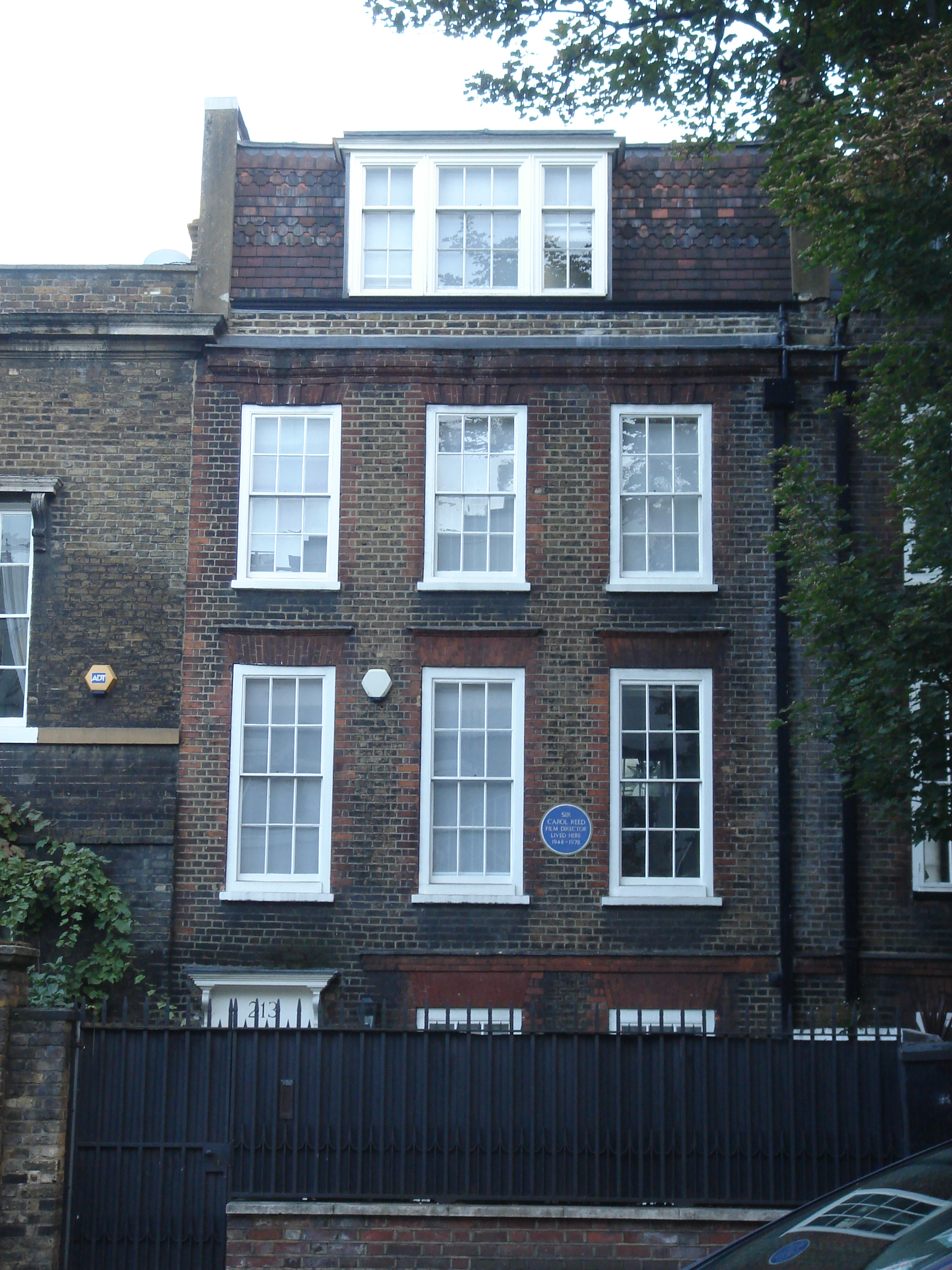
213 King's Road

In 1952, he became only the second British film director to be knighted for his craft. The first was Sir Alexander Korda in 1942, the producer of some of Reed's most admired films.

== Personal life ==
From 1943 until 1947, he was married to the British actress Diana Wynyard. After their divorce, he married in 1948 the actress Penelope Dudley-Ward, also known as Pempie, the elder daughter of Freda Dudley Ward, who had been a mistress of Edward, Prince of Wales (later King Edward VIII, then Duke of Windsor). They had one son. His stepdaughter Tracy Reed, Ward's daughter, also had an acting career. Actor Oliver Reed was his nephew.

=== Death ===
Reed died from a heart attack on 25 April 1976, aged 69, at his home at 213 King's Road, Chelsea, where he had lived since 1948. He is buried in Kensington Cemetery, Gunnersbury, west London. A blue plaque has been placed on his former home in his honour.

== Filmography ==
Year	Title	Functioned as		Notes
Year	Title	Director	Producer	Notes
1935	Midshipman Easy	Yes	No	
1936	Laburnum Grove	Yes	No	
1937	Talk of the Devil	Yes	No	Also writer
1937	Who's Your Lady Friend?	Yes	No	
1938	Penny Paradise	Yes	No	
1938	Bank Holiday	Yes	No	
1939	Climbing High	Yes	No	
1939	A Girl Must Live	Yes	No	
1940	The Stars Look Down	Yes	No	
1940	Girl in the News	Yes	No	
1940	Night Train to Munich	Yes	No	
1941	Kipps	Yes	No	
1941	A Letter from Home	Yes	No	
1942	The Young Mr. Pitt	Yes	No	
1942	We Serve	Yes	No	Recruiting film produced by Verity Films for the ATS.
1943	The New Lot	Yes	No	
1944	The Way Ahead	Yes	No	
1945	The True Glory	Yes	No	Propaganda film for United States Office of War Information and Ministry of Information.
1947	Odd Man Out	Yes	Yes	
1948	The Fallen Idol	Yes	Yes	
1949	The Third Man	Yes	Yes	
1952	Outcast of the Islands	Yes	Yes	
1953	The Man Between	Yes	Yes	
1955	A Kid for Two Farthings	Yes	Yes	
1956	Trapeze	Yes	No	
1958	The Key	Yes	No	
1959	Our Man in Havana	Yes	Yes	
1963	The Running Man	Yes	Yes	
1965	The Agony and the Ecstasy	Yes	Yes	
1968	Oliver!	Yes	No	
1970	Flap	Yes	No	
1972	Follow Me!	Yes	No	

== Awards and nominations ==
Institution	Year	Category	Work	Result	Ref.
Academy Awards	1950	Best Director	The Fallen Idol	Nominated	
Academy Awards	1951	Best Director	The Third Man	Nominated	
Academy Awards	1969	Best Director	Oliver!	Won	
Berlin International Film Festival	1956	Bronze Bear	Trapeze	Won	
Bodil Awards	1950	Best European Film	The Fallen Idol	Won	
British Academy Film Awards	1949 (Note: 1st and 2nd BAFTA ceremonies were held concurrently on 29 May 1949, Odd Man Out won Best British Film for 1947 and The Fallen Idol won Best British Film for 1948.)	Best British Film	Odd Man Out	Won	
British Academy Film Awards	1949	Best British Film	The Fallen Idol	Won	
British Academy Film Awards	1969	Best Film	Oliver!	Nominated	
British Academy Film Awards	1969	Best Direction	Oliver!	Nominated	
Cannes Film Festival	1949	Palme d'Or	The Third Man	Won	
Cannes Film Festival	1955	Palme d'Or	A Kid for Two Farthings	Nominated	
Directors Guild of America	1950	Outstanding Directorial Achievement in Theatrical Feature Film	The Third Man	Nominated	
Directors Guild of America	1957	Outstanding Directorial Achievement in Theatrical Feature Film	Trapeze	Nominated	
Directors Guild of America	1961	Outstanding Directorial Achievement in Theatrical Feature Film	Our Man in Havana	Nominated	
Directors Guild of America	1969	Outstanding Directorial Achievement in Theatrical Feature Film	Oliver!	Nominated	
Golden Globe Awards	1969	Best Director	Oliver!	Nominated	
Moscow International Film Festival	1969	Golden Prize	Oliver!	Nominated	
Moscow International Film Festival	1969	Special Prize	Oliver!	Won	
New York Film Critics Circle	1940	Best Director	Night Train to Munich	Nominated	
New York Film Critics Circle	1949	Best Director	The Fallen Idol	Won	
New York Film Critics Circle	1968	Best Director	Oliver!	Nominated	
Venice Film Festival	1947	Grand International Prize	The Fallen Idol	Nominated	
Venice Film Festival	1948	Grand International Prize	Odd Man Out	Nominated	

== See also ==
- List of Academy Award winners and nominees from Great Britain
