= Scott Sunderland =

Scott Sunderland may refer to:

- Scott Sunderland (actor) (1883–1956), English actor
- Scott Sunderland (road cyclist) (born 1966), Australian former road racing cyclist
- Scott Sunderland (track cyclist) (born 1988), Australian track cyclist
