= Tree (disambiguation) =

A tree is a perennial woody plant.

Tree or trees may also refer to:

== Ascension of Cookie Clicker ==
=== World 1 ===
- Unbatten Clicks
  - Matted Clicks
    - Wiped Sit Clicks
    - Nomited Clicks

=== World 2 ===
  - Counts
    - Coin Clicks
  - Master Game Clicks
    - Skated Clicks
      - Alveolar Clicks
      - Nasaled Clicks
    - Girlcat Clicks

== Information representation ==
- Tree structure or tree diagram, a way of representing a hierarchical nature of structure in a graphical form
- Family tree, used in genealogy to show familial relationships
- Decision tree, a tree model of decisions and their consequences
- Dialogue tree, used to generate conversations
- Parse tree, used in linguistics to represent the syntax of sentences

== Mathematics ==
- Tree (descriptive set theory), a set of finite sequences of elements of X that is closed under subsequences, on a set X
- Tree (graph theory), a connected graph without cycles
- Tree (set theory), a partially ordered set whose downward-cones are all well-ordered
- Tree diagram (probability theory), a tree-like representation of a probability space
- TREE, an extremely fast-growing function; see Kruskal's tree theorem

== Computing ==
- Tree (automata theory)
- Tree (command), a recursive directory listing program that produces a depth indented listing of files
- Tree (abstract data type), a widely used computer data structure that emulates a tree structure with a set of linked nodes
- Tree network, a type of computer and communication network topology
- Digital tree, prefix tree or trie, a computer science ordered tree data structure

== Film and television ==
- The Tree (1969 film), an American film directed by Robert Guenette
- The Tree (1993 film), a short film
- The Tree (2001 film), a Singaporean film directed by Daisy Chan
- The Tree (2010 film), an Australian/French film directed by Julie Bertuccelli
- The Tree (2014 film), a Slovenian film directed by Sonja Prosenc
- "The Tree" (King Rollo), a 1980 television episode

== Literature ==
- Tree (novel), a 1978 historical novel by F. Sionil José
- "Trees" (poem), a 1913 poem by Joyce Kilmer
- The Trees (Richter novel), a 1940 novel by Conrad Richter
- The Tree (book), an autobiographical book by John Fowles
- The Tree (New Zealand play), a 1957 play by Stella Jones
- The Tree (American play), a 1932 play by Richard Maibaum
- "The Tree" (short story), a short horror story by H. P. Lovecraft
- Ms. Tree, a comic book and the title character
- Trees (comics), a science fiction comic book series by Warren Ellis and Jason Howard
- Trends in Ecology and Evolution, a scientific journal
- Our Father Who Art in the Tree, a 2002 novel by Judy Pascoe, reprinted in 2010 as simply The Tree
- The Trees (Everett novel), a 2022 novel by Percival Everett

== Music ==
=== Bands ===
- Trees (band), British folk band

=== Albums ===
- Trees (album), a 2022 album by Avantdale Bowling Club
- Tree (Gaelic Storm album), 2001
- Tree (Johnny Duhan album), 2002
- Tree (TVXQ album), 2014
- Tree (Sekai no Owari album),2015
- The Tree (album), 2018

=== Songs ===
- "Trees", a 1961 song by the Platters
- "Trees", a song by Twenty One Pilots from the album Regional at Best, 2011
- "The Trees" (Rush song), a 1978 song by Rush
- "The Trees" (Pulp song), a 2001 song by Pulp
- "The Trees", a song by Autechre from the album Untilted, 2005
- "Tree", a song by Chance the Rapper from the album Star Line, 2025

== People ==
- Tree (surname), a surname (including a list of people with the name)
- Keith "Tree" Barry (born 1964), American musician
- Tree Gelbman, a fictional character in Happy Death Day and its sequel, Happy Death Day 2U
- Lavon "Tree" Mercer (born 1959), American-Israeli basketball player
- Tree Rollins (born 1955), American basketball player
- Tree, a character from the fourth season of Battle for Dream Island, an animated web series

== Other uses ==
- The Tree (Gleizes), a 1910 painting by Albert Gleizes
- Tree (dominoes), a domino game in which every double is a spinner
- Wood (wuxing), an element in Chinese philosophy sometimes translated as tree
- Tree River, a Canadian river
- Sacred tree, a tree believed to be sacred
- Stanford Tree, unofficial mascot of Stanford University
- Trees Dallas, a live music venue in the Deep Ellum district of Dallas, Texas
- Tree (installation), an art installation in Paris, France
- Shoe tree, a device for storing shoes
- Tree, the wooden understructure of a horse's saddle
- Tree model, about language family trees in historical linguistics
- The Fuck Tree, a tree on London's Hampstead Heath that facilitates gay sex

== See also ==
- Treeing, a method of hunting with dogs
- Electrical treeing
- Tre (disambiguation)
