= Beerbohm family =

The Beerbohm family are the descendants of Julius Ewald Edward Beerbohm (9 April 1810 – 30 August 1892), the son of Ernest Henery Beerbohm (12 May 1763 – 22 May 1838) and Henrietta Radke (1767–1855), and of Dutch, Lithuanian and German origin, who hailed from Memel (now renamed Klaipėda and the chief port of Lithuania) on the Baltic coast. He moved to England in about 1830 and set up as a corn merchant. He first married an Englishwoman, Constantia Draper (1827–1858); the couple had four children. Following her death, in 1860 he married Eliza Draper (1834–1918), Constantia's sister, and had another five children. As a deceased wife's sister, Eliza's marriage to Julius Beerbohm was celebrated outside the United Kingdom.

== Descendants of Julius and Constantia Beerbohm ==
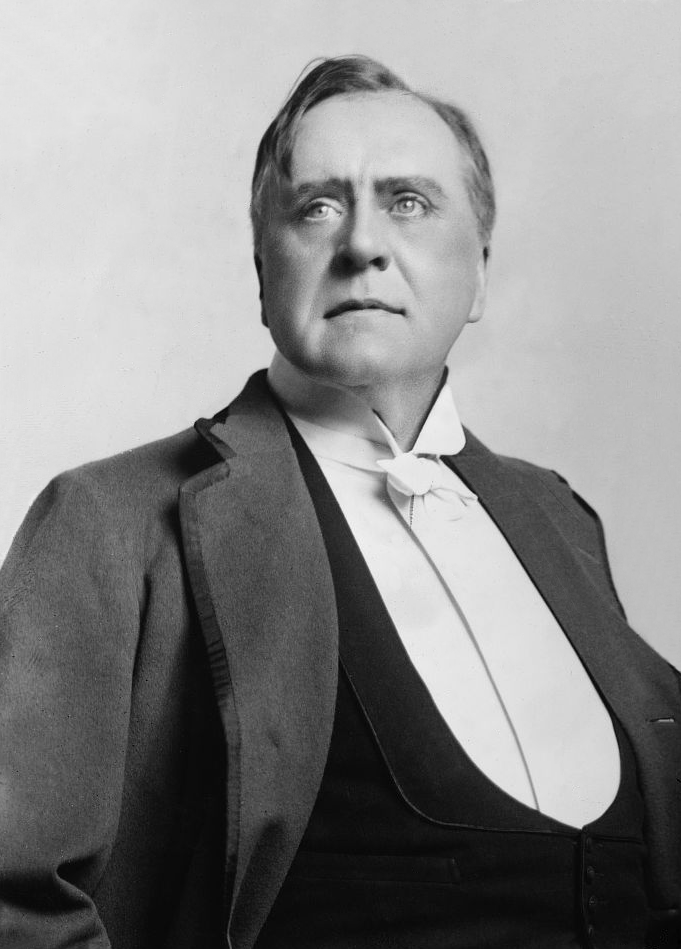
Herbert Beerbohm Tree in about 1914

Julius Beerbohm in a painting by Anders Zorn

1 Ernest Beerbohm (1850 – ?) who went to South Africa as a sheep farmer in Cape Colony and married a native South African

2 Herbert Beerbohm Tree married actress Helen Maud Holt (1858-1937) in 1882. Their children were:

- Viola Tree (1884–1938) married drama critic, Alan Leonard Romaine Parsons (1889–1933). Their children were:

- David Tree
- Denys Parsons, who married Kelty MacLeod
  - Alan Parsons (born 1948)
  - Paul Parsons.
- Virginia Penelope Parsons (9 April 1917 – 18 September 2003), wife successively of David Pax Tennant (a son of the 1st Baron Glenconner) and of Henry Thynne, 6th Marquess of Bath. They had one daughter.

- Felicity Tree (1895–1978) married Sir Geoffrey Cory-Wright, 3rd Baronet. They had five sons:

- Captain (Anthony John) Julian Cory-Wright (29 August 1916 – 26 June 1944), whose only son is the present baronet.
- Michael Cory-Wright (5 March 1920 – 3 January 1997)
- David Arthur Cory-Wright (19 March 1925 – 10 January 2009) who md 1stly and 3rdly Lady Jane Douglas, sister of David Douglas, 12th Marquess of Queensberry and had children
- Lieutenant Jonathan Francis Cory-Wright (19 March 1925 – 9 April 1945)
- Mark Richard Geoffrey Cory-Wright (21 March 1930 – 4 August 2004) married and left children.

- Iris Tree (1897-1968) married firstly Curtis Moffat.

- Ivan Moffat screenwriter. He married firstly Natasha Sorokin – marriage dissolved.

- Lorna Moffat

- He married secondly The Hon Katharine Smith, the daughter of the Rt. Hon William Henry Smith The 3rd Viscount Hambleden, of W.H.Smith's.

- Jonathan Moffat (born 1964)

- Georgina Moffat (born 1989), actress who appeared in the TV series Skins.

- Patrick Moffat (born 1968)

- Ivan Moffat had an affair with author Lady Caroline Blackwood

- Ivana Lowell (born 1966)

Iris Tree's second marriage was to the actor and ex-officer of the Austrian cavalry, Count Friedrich von Ledebur-Wicheln.

Herbert Beerbohm Tree also had seven illegitimate children from his numerous affairs, among them the director Carol Reed and Peter Reed, whose son became the actor Oliver Reed (who played Bill Sikes in the musical Oliver!). Another was the actress Lydia Bilbrook.

3 Julius Beerbohm engineer and explorer – married Mrs Evelyn Younghusband.

- Clarence Evelyn Beerbohm (1885-1917) – musical comedy actor and soldier, killed in action during World War I. He married Elizabeth H. Littlewood (1881-1967) in 1909 in London.

- John David Russel Beerbohm (1910-1989)

- Marie Marguerite Beerbohm (born 1890) – married Ernest Alexander Stuart Watt (1874 - 1954) on 22 February 1912 at the register office, Hanover Square - marriage dissolved 1913

4 Constance Beerbohm – author and house keeper for Eliza, her father's second wife.

== Descendants of Julius and Eliza Beerbohm ==
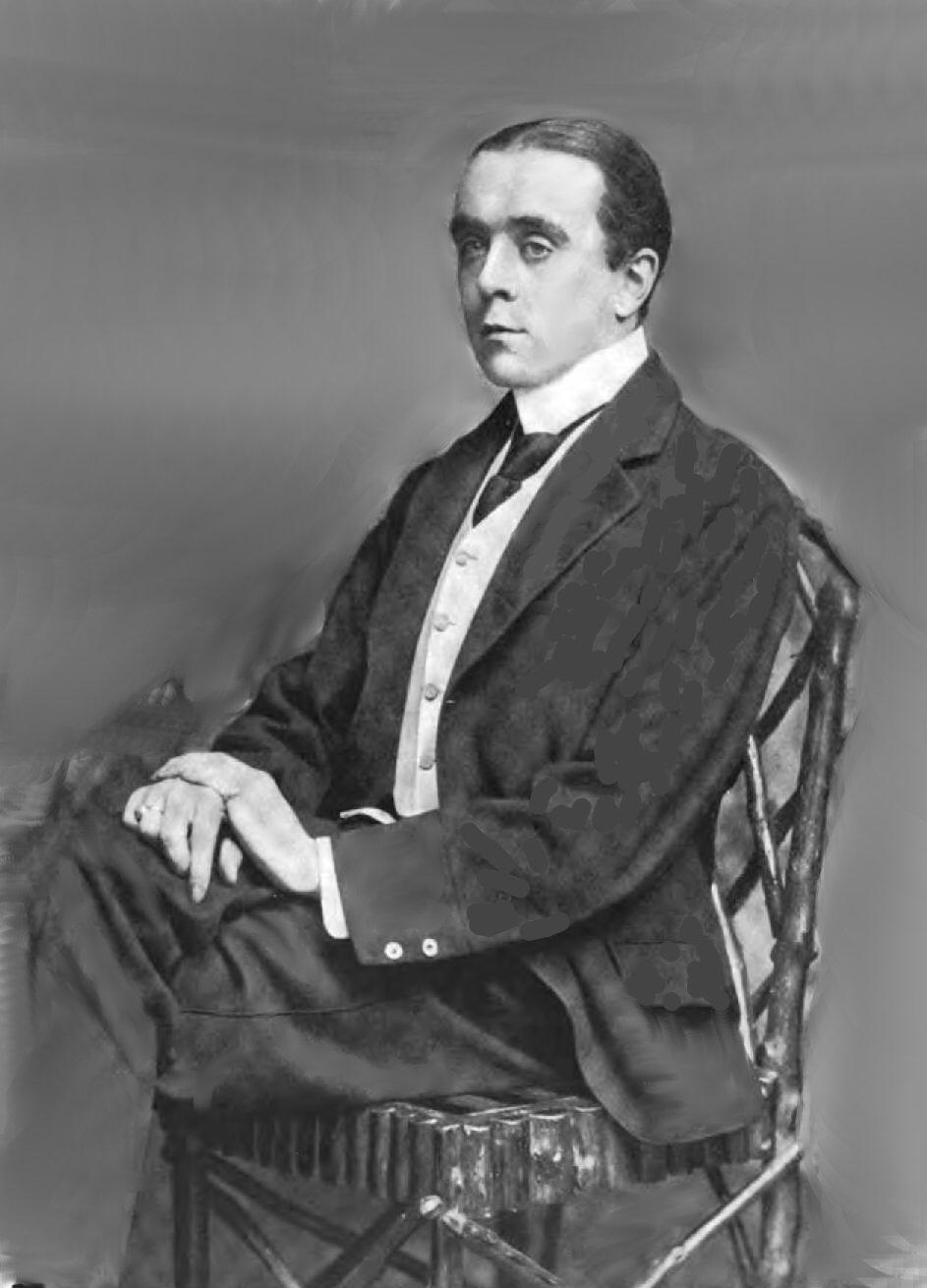
Max Beerbohm in 1901

1 Agnes Mary Beerbohm (1865–1949), who married Ralph Neville in 1884, was a friend of the artist Walter Sickert, modelling for him in his 1906 painting Fancy Dress.
She married, secondly, Edmund Francis Vesey Knox (1865 - 1921)

2 Dora Beerbohm (1868 –13 August 1940); in 1894 became a Sister in the Anglican Order of Sisters of Mercy at St Saviour's Priory in Ilford. Died shortly after a fall down some steps at the Priory.

3 Marie Beerbohm – died young

4 Daughter – died young

5 Max Beerbohm, caricaturist and parodist, who married:

Florence Kahn in 1910 – no children

Elisabeth Jungmann in 1956 – no children
