= Ivan Moffat =

British screenwriter (1918–2002)

Ivan Romilly Moffat (18 February 1918 – 4 July 2002) was a British screenwriter, film producer and socialite who, with Fred Guiol, was nominated for an Academy Award for Best Adapted Screenplay for adapting Edna Ferber's eponymous novel into the film Giant (1956). Moffat was the grandson of actor-manager Sir Herbert Beerbohm Tree.

After studying at the London School of Economics, Moffat became a socialite and began to make films to promote the war effort. During World War II he filmed activities of the US Army, meeting director George Stevens, whom he soon followed to Hollywood and assisted at Paramount Pictures. In the 1950s, between his two marriages, Moffat had a string of love affairs, notably with Elizabeth Taylor and Lady Caroline Blackwood. Beginning in 1956 he wrote or co-wrote screenplays for a number of well-known films, in addition to Giant, and in the 1970s wrote for television.

== Early life ==
Ivan Moffat was born in Havana, Cuba, the son of the British actress and poet Iris Tree and her American husband, artist and photographer Curtis Moffat. He was the grandson of actor-manager Sir Herbert Beerbohm Tree. The family lived, among other places, in America and Australia, and moved to London when Moffat was 8 years old. There, Moffat attended Dartington Hall School, in Totnes, Devon, befriending Michael Young. Moffat then studied at the London School of Economics. As an undergraduate, he joined the Communist Party, which caused him later to be blacklisted for a time in Hollywood. Jessica Mitford once described Moffat as "spanning the gap between Left-wing politics and the deb dance scene".

By 1938, after his father moved back to America, Moffat joined the Gargoyle Club in Soho, hosting frequent parties in his father's famously decorated house, meeting Philip Toynbee and Dylan Thomas and working for Strand Films, where he helped to make documentaries for the government to promote the war effort. In 1943, after America entered World War II, Moffat enlisted in the US Army, serving as a writer in the Signal Corps, a special unit known as the "Hollywood Irregulars". There, he served for the first time under the director George Stevens as a writer and assistant director. After filming and photographing allied forces in D-Day landings and at the Battle of the Bulge, among other events, the unit filmed the liberation of Paris and of Dachau concentration camp.

== Film and television ==
After the war, Moffat settled in Hollywood, joining Stevens as an assistant producer at Liberty Films, which was soon purchased by Paramount Pictures. There he assisted Stevens on such movies as I Remember Mama (1948), Shane (1951) and A Place in the Sun (1951). In 1956, Moffat worked on the screenplays for Bhowani Junction, D-Day the Sixth of June and Giant. The screenplay for Giant brought Moffat and co-writer Fred Guiol an Oscar nomination.

Among other screenplays that Moffat wrote or co-wrote were The Wayward Bus and Boy on a Dolphin (both 1957), They Came to Cordura (1959), Tender Is the Night (1962), The Heroes of Telemark and The Greatest Story Ever Told (both 1965), and Black Sunday (1977), as well as revising the screenplay for The Great Escape (1963) and The Chase (1966).

In the 1970s, Moffat wrote episodes of the television series Colditz, and in 1985 he wrote the story and co-wrote the script for the television film Florence Nightingale, which starred Jaclyn Smith. Moffat is interviewed extensively in the documentary George Stevens: A Filmmaker's Journey (1985) and on the DVDs of Shane and Giant.

== Personal life ==
Moffat became friends with Simone de Beauvoir and Jean-Paul Sartre in Paris, marrying their protege Natasha Sorokin at the end of World War II, with whom he had one daughter, Lorna Moffat. The marriage soon collapsed. Moffat had a string of affairs with women in the 1950s. Moffat's friend Christopher Isherwood wrote in his diary that Moffat "is always so pretty and bright eyed and clean – he has to be for I imagine his evenings usually end, if they don't begin, visiting some girl". In 1956 he began a long on again, off again affair with then-married Lady Caroline Blackwood, fathering her daughter Ivana Lowell in 1966, after he was remarried. He had a brief affair with Elizabeth Taylor during the filming of A Place in the Sun.

In 1961, Moffat married The Hon. Katharine Smith, the daughter of the Rt. Hon. William Henry Smith, 3rd Viscount Hambleden (a descendant of the founder of W H Smith) and his wife Patricia (daughter of the 15th Earl of Pembroke). Through the Pembroke family, Katharine descended from Countess Catherine Vorontsov. During the marriage, the couple moved back to London when Moffat was hired to "doctor" the screenplay for The Great Escape (1963), and partly so his wife could fulfil her responsibilities as lady-in-waiting to the Queen Mother. With Katharine, he had two sons.

Moffat died on 4 July 2002, aged 84, in Los Angeles, California.

== See also ==
- Beerbohm family
