= Still Waters Run Deep (film) =

- Directed by: Fred Paul
- Written by: Tom Taylor (play); Dane Stanton
- Starring: Lady Tree; Milton Rosmer; Rutland Barrington
- Production company: Ideal Film Company
- Distributed by: Ideal Film Company
- Release date: January 1916
- Country: United Kingdom
- Language: English

Still Waters Run Deep is a 1916 British silent crime film directed by Fred Paul and starring Lady Tree, Milton Rosmer and Rutland Barrington. It was based on the 1855 play Still Waters Run Deep by Tom Taylor.

== Premise ==
A captain begins blackmailing a wealthy family. He is found dead, and the wealthy family is caught up in the ensuing investigation of his death. Each member is pitted against each other to prove innocence.

== Cast ==
- Lady Tree - Mrs. Sternhold
- Milton Rosmer - John Mildmay
- Rutland Barrington - Mr. Potter
- Sydney Lewis Ransome - Captain Hawksley
- Hilda Bruce-Potter - Mrs. Mildmay
