= David Tree =

British actor (1915–2009)

David Tree (born Ian David Parsons; 15 July 1915 – 4 November 2009) was an English stage and screen actor from a distinguished theatrical family whose career in the 1930s included roles in numerous stage presentations as well as in thirteen films produced between 1937 and 1941, among which were 1939's Goodbye Mr. Chips and two of producer Gabriel Pascal's adaptations of Shaw classics, 1938's Pygmalion, in which he portrayed Freddy Eynsford-Hill, and 1941's Major Barbara, in which he was Charles Lomax.

== Early stage experience ==
Tree was born in Welwyn Garden City, Hertfordshire, the son of theatre critic Alan Parsons and actress Viola Tree, the daughter of renowned Victorian actor-manager Sir Herbert Beerbohm Tree. The young performer's first exposure to the stage came at the age of six, when he played a bear in his mother's 1921 revival of The Tempest at the Aldwych Theatre in London and continued through his childhood years, as exemplified by his portrayal, at eleven-and-a-half, of Lieutenant Spicer in a January 1927 juvenile production of Quality Street.

Taking as his stage name the famous surname from his mother's side of the family, he spent a year studying drama at the Old Vic where, in his words, he "played spear carriers and said 'Hail Caesar!' a lot", such as in September 1934's production of Antony and Cleopatra. Joining the repertory company at Oxford Playhouse, he remained there, on and off, for three seasons and, by March 1937, was at the Embassy and Savoy theatres, playing Mago in The Road to Rome. In 1938, he was Robin in Only Yesterday at the Intimate Theatre during February, Ferdinand in The Tempest and Feste in Twelfth Night at Regent Park's Open Air Theatre during June–July, Edgar Malleson in Serena Blandish at the Gate Theatre Studio during September, and Gerald in Ma's Bit O'Brass at the Q Theatre during October. In 1939 he had a notable success portraying Mervyn Brudge in Little Ladyship at the Strand Theatre during February and, during March, played Christopher Hatton in Drake at the Coliseum Theatre for King George's Pension Fund for Actors.

== Film work and new career path after World War II ==
Tree entered films in 1937 and played a string of character parts in films such as that year's Return of the Scarlet Pimpernel and the role of Freddy in the following year's Pygmalion, which had special significance for him, because his grandfather, Herbert Beerbohm Tree originated the role of Henry Higgins in the play's initial English-language production in 1914. In a sentimental gesture, the film's producer, Gabriel Pascal, cast Tree's mother, Viola, in the cameo role of social reporter Perfide, giving Tree a final opportunity to work with his mother. Ill with pleurisy, she died at the age of 54, five weeks after Pygmalion's 6 October 1938 London premiere.

Tree supported Robert Donat in 1937's Knight Without Armour and played a young teacher in Donat's Goodbye, Mr. Chips in 1939. At the start of the wartime 1940s, he appeared in four releases, French Without Tears, Return to Yesterday, Just William and Major Barbara, but shortly after putting his promising film career on hold to aid the war effort, he lost his left hand due to a faulty grenade. After his recovery, he volunteered for the S.O.E., and was put in command of a school in the Scottish countryside to train agents.

The war came to an end during his extended recovery, and his former commanding officer having suggested that Tree become a teacher, he attended Magdalen College, Oxford, where he earned a two-year degree in English. He decided to become a gentleman farmer, moved to some land with an old schoolhouse in Broxbourne, Hertfordshire that he had inherited from his mother, and converted it to a modern farm. Since the property included the wall of 15th century house known as Baas Manor, he combined the cottages, creating Baas Manor Farm. Having met Mary Vick of Rickmansworth on an underground train on the last day of the war, he introduced himself and, within a short time, asked her to marry him. Starting a farm where none had been before, they raised, in turn, bees, ducks, cows and Landrace pigs. In 1959, he exhibited his pigs at the Royal Show and broke a record by winning 1st prize in five classes as well as Supreme Champion.

From the mid-1960s he was a leading commercial lily grower and humorously chronicled his successes, failures and adventures as a postwar farmer in the autobiography, Pig in the Middle (Michael Joseph, 1966, reprinted by Noble Books, 2006). The book became the basis for the 1975–78 sitcom The Good Life, for which he received no royalties or credit, except for recognition from cast member Felicity Kendal. In 1961 he became a founding member of the Hoddesdon Society "set up to protect the town from tower blocks and excessive development that did not fit in with its historic architecture", remaining the Society's president for a number of years.

== Later years and death ==
In 1973, Tree's friend, director Nicolas Roeg, persuaded him to return to the screen in Roeg's horror film Don't Look Now, playing the role of an ineffectual headmaster. The Tree family manor provided the exterior and interior for the opening sequences as did his lake, where the red anoraked girl drowns. Tree was deeply contented in his home life, his 63-year marriage and his passionate interests in gardening, natural history, ecology, history and the career of his renowned grandfather. He died at the Queen Elizabeth II Hospital in Welwyn Garden City three-and-a-half months after his 94th birthday, leaving his wife, Mary, daughters Belinda, Gay and Vicken, and son James. Another daughter, Susie, died in 1989.

Tree is fondly remembered in the autobiographies of fellow performer James Mason (Before I Forget, Hamish Hamilton, 1981), with whom he appeared in the supporting cast of Return of the Scarlet Pimpernel, and actor-turned-documentary-maker Kenneth Griffith (The Fools Pardon, Little, Brown and Company, 1994).

== Filmography ==
Year	Title	Role	Notes
1937	Knight Without Armour	Maronin	Film debut
1937	The Return of the Scarlet Pimpernel	Lord Harry Denning	
1937	Paradise for Two	Marcel	
1938	The Drum	Lieut. Escott	
1938	Pygmalion	Freddy Eynsford Hill	
1938	Old Iron	Michael	
1939	Over the Moon	Journalist	
1939	Q Planes	Robert Mackenzie	
1939	Goodbye, Mr. Chips	Jackson	
1940	French Without Tears	Chris Neilan	
1940	Return to Yesterday	Peter Thropp	
1940	Just William	Marmaduke Bott	
1941	Major Barbara	Charles Lomax	
1973	Don't Look Now	Anthony Babbage	Final film

== See also ==
- Beerbohm family
