= Pygmalion (1938 film) =

1938 British film written by G. B. Shaw from his play

- Theatrical release poster
- Directed by: Anthony Asquith; Leslie Howard
- Screenplay by: George Bernard Shaw; W. P. Lipscomb; Cecil Lewis; Ian Dalrymple
- Based on: Pygmalion; 1913 play by George Bernard Shaw
- Produced by: Gabriel Pascal
- Starring: Leslie Howard; Wendy Hiller; Wilfrid Lawson; Leueen MacGrath
- Cinematography: Harry Stradling
- Edited by: David Lean
- Music by: Arthur Honegger
- Production company: Gabriel Film Productions
- Distributed by: General Film Distributors
- Release date: 6 October 1938
- Running time: 96 minutes
- Country: United Kingdom
- Language: English
- Budget: £87,000
- Box office: $1.4 million

Pygmalion is a 1938 British film based on George Bernard Shaw's 1913 play, and adapted by him for the screen. It stars Leslie Howard as Professor Henry Higgins and Wendy Hiller as Eliza Doolittle.

The film was a financial and critical success, and won an Oscar for Best Screenplay and three more nominations: Best Picture, Best Actor (Howard), and Best Actress (Hiller). The screenplay later was adapted into the 1956 theatrical musical My Fair Lady, which in turn led to the 1964 film of the same name.

== Plot ==
Pygmalion was a mythological character who dabbled in sculpture. He made a statue of his ideal woman – Galatea. It was so beautiful that he prayed the gods to give it life. His wish was granted.

Bernard Shaw in his famous play gives a modern interpretation of this theme.

— Opening captions

While transcribing the conversation of passers-by one evening, linguist Professor Higgins is mistaken for a policeman, causing protests from the Covent Garden flower seller Eliza Doolittle and various bystanders. As the incident is being cleared up, Higgins talks to Colonel Pickering, a fellow scholar of languages and dialects, who has come from India in order to meet him. Higgins argues that by teaching Eliza to speak correctly by his methods, she could have a better future and would even be able to pass as a duchess.

Next morning, Eliza arrives at Higgins' house to ask for elocution lessons. Colonel Pickering makes a bet with him, offering to pay all the expenses if the professor manages to fulfill his boast. Eliza is then taken upstairs to have a bath by Mrs Pearce, the housekeeper, and while this is taking place, Eliza's father, the dustman Alfred Doolittle, arrives to demand compensation for the loss of his daughter. Amused by Doolittle's roguish attitude, Higgins offers him £10, but Doolittle will only accept £5, explaining that as one of the "undeserving poor" he only wants enough for a drunken weekend.

After a rigorous internship, Eliza is sent as an experiment to an at-home gathering held by Mrs Higgins, the professor's mother. There, though speaking in a well-bred accent, Eliza scandalizes those present with her vulgar, slang-filled conversation and profanity. But one of the guests - young Freddy Eynsford-Hill - is fascinated by her. After the guests leave, Mrs Higgins voices her disgust that Eliza's two protectors are treating her more like a plaything than a human being.

Following weeks of further coaching, during which Freddy tries in vain to see her again, Eliza is accompanied by Higgins and Pickering to an embassy reception. There Higgins meets his former pupil, the Hungarian Count Aristid Karpathy, who has become famous for his ability to coach American heiresses in elocution and identify the origins of high society people from their way of speaking. Higgins and Pickering fear that Eliza will be exposed by him, but she manages to deceive him so successfully that he takes her for a Hungarian princess - explaining that her English is too perfect to be that of a native speaker.

Returning from the reception, Higgins and Pickering congratulate each other on their success, neglecting Eliza's contribution and commitment and especially her feelings. Wounded by his indifference, Eliza quarrels with the professor, throwing his slippers in his face when he asks for them, and complains that she has become unsuited to her former way of life. After he goes to bed, she leaves to take refuge at the home of Mrs Higgins.

Next morning Higgins visits his mother and is relieved to learn that Eliza is there. Before the two can meet, however, Mr Doolittle arrives to complain of the way Higgins has disrupted his life. The professor had jested to an American millionaire that the most original moralist in England was Doolittle, and when the millionaire died he had left Doolittle a bequest of £3000 annually to give six lectures a year, thus forcing respectability on the dustman. He is now on his way to a fashionable London church to marry his unwed partner and persuades Eliza, Pickering and Mrs Higgins to support him through the ordeal.

Higgins and Eliza are left alone for a while and he tries to persuade her to return home with him, but she objects that he simply takes her for granted. Instead she would prefer to marry Freddy, who is charming but has no income. When Higgins scoffs at this, Eliza horrifies him by threatening to use her newly-learned talents to give elocution lessons and so gain economic independence.

Once the party leaves to attend the wedding, an upset Higgins returns home after a long walk and accidentally turns on a recording of Eliza's first visit. As he listens, he is surprised to hear the real Eliza at the door to his study, mockingly quoting her former self by announcing, "I washed my face and hands before I come, I did". He turns his back and asks her where his slippers are, leaving their future relationship ambiguous.

== Cast ==
Wendy Hiller and Leslie Howard in Pygmalion

- Leslie Howard as Professor Henry Higgins
- Wendy Hiller as Eliza Doolittle
- Wilfrid Lawson as Alfred Doolittle
- Marie Lohr as Mrs. Higgins
- Scott Sunderland as Colonel George Pickering
- Jean Cadell as Mrs. Pearce
- David Tree as Freddy Eynsford-Hill
- Everley Gregg as Mrs. Eynsford-Hill
- Leueen MacGrath as Clara Eynsford-Hill
- Esmé Percy as Count Aristid Karpathy
- Violet Vanbrugh as the Ambassadress
- Iris Hoey as Ysabel, Social Reporter
- Viola Tree as Perfide, Social Reporter
- Irene Browne as the Duchess
- Kate Cutler as The Grand Old Lady
- Cathleen Nesbitt as Old Lady
- O. B. Clarence as Mr. Birchwood, the Vicar
- Wally Patch as First Bystander
- H. F. Maltby as Second Bystander
- George Mozart as Third Bystander
- Ivor Barnard as Sarcastic Bystander
- Cecil Trouncer as First Policeman
- Stephen Murray as Second Policeman
- Eileen Beldon as Mrs Higgins’s Parlourmaid
- Frank Atkinson as Taxi Driver

Uncredited

- Leo Genn as a Prince
- Moyna Macgill as a Woman Bystander
- Patrick Macnee as an Extra
- Anthony Quayle as Eliza's Hairdresser

== Production ==
=== Adaptation ===
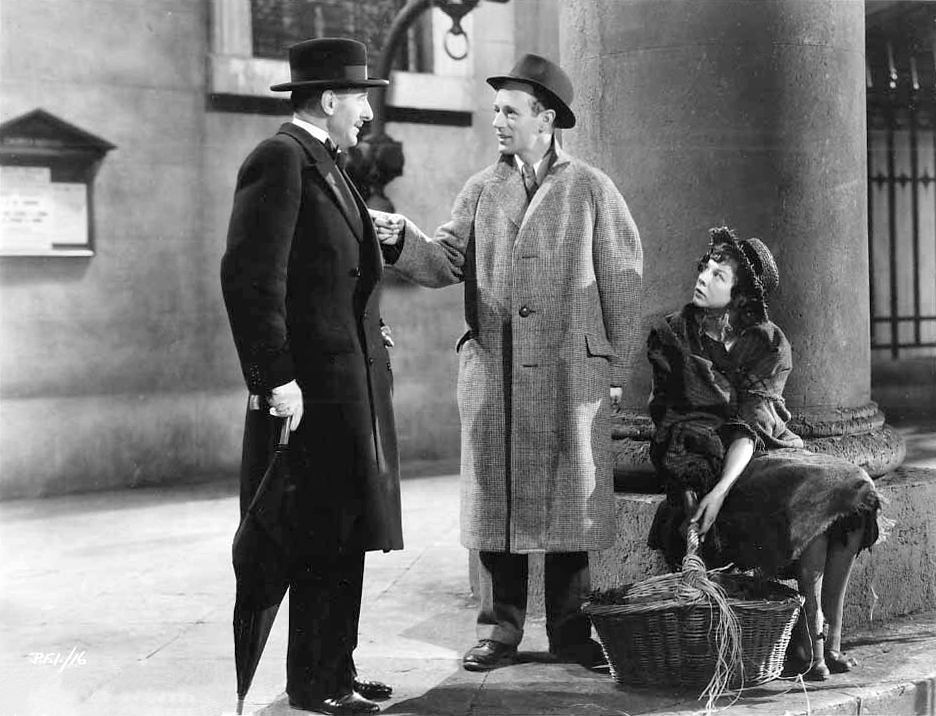
Scott Sunderland, Leslie Howard and Wendy Hiller in Pygmalion

The Hungarian producer Gabriel Pascal wished to create a set of films based on Shaw's works, beginning with Pygmalion, and went to see Shaw in person to gain permission to do so. Shaw was reluctant to allow a film adaptation of Pygmalion owing to the low quality of previous film adaptations of his works, but Pascal managed to convince him (on the condition Shaw retained constant personal supervision of the adaptation) and later went on to adapt Major Barbara, Caesar and Cleopatra and Androcles and the Lion.

The resulting Pygmalion scenario by Cecil Lewis and W. P. Lipscomb removed exposition unnecessary outside a theatrical context and added new scenes and dialogue by Shaw. Ian Dalrymple, Anatole de Grunwald and Kay Walsh also made uncredited contributions to the screenplay. A long ballroom sequence was added, introducing an entirely new character, Count Aristid Karpathy (seen both here and in the musical My Fair Lady, named as Professor Zoltan Karpathy – mentioned in the final scene of the original play, but with no name or onstage appearance), written wholly by Shaw. He and his fellow writers also managed to retain the controversial line "Not bloody likely!" from the play's text, making Hiller possibly the first person to utter that swear word in a British film and giving rise to adverts for the film reading "Miss Pygmalion? Not ****** likely!".

=== Casting ===
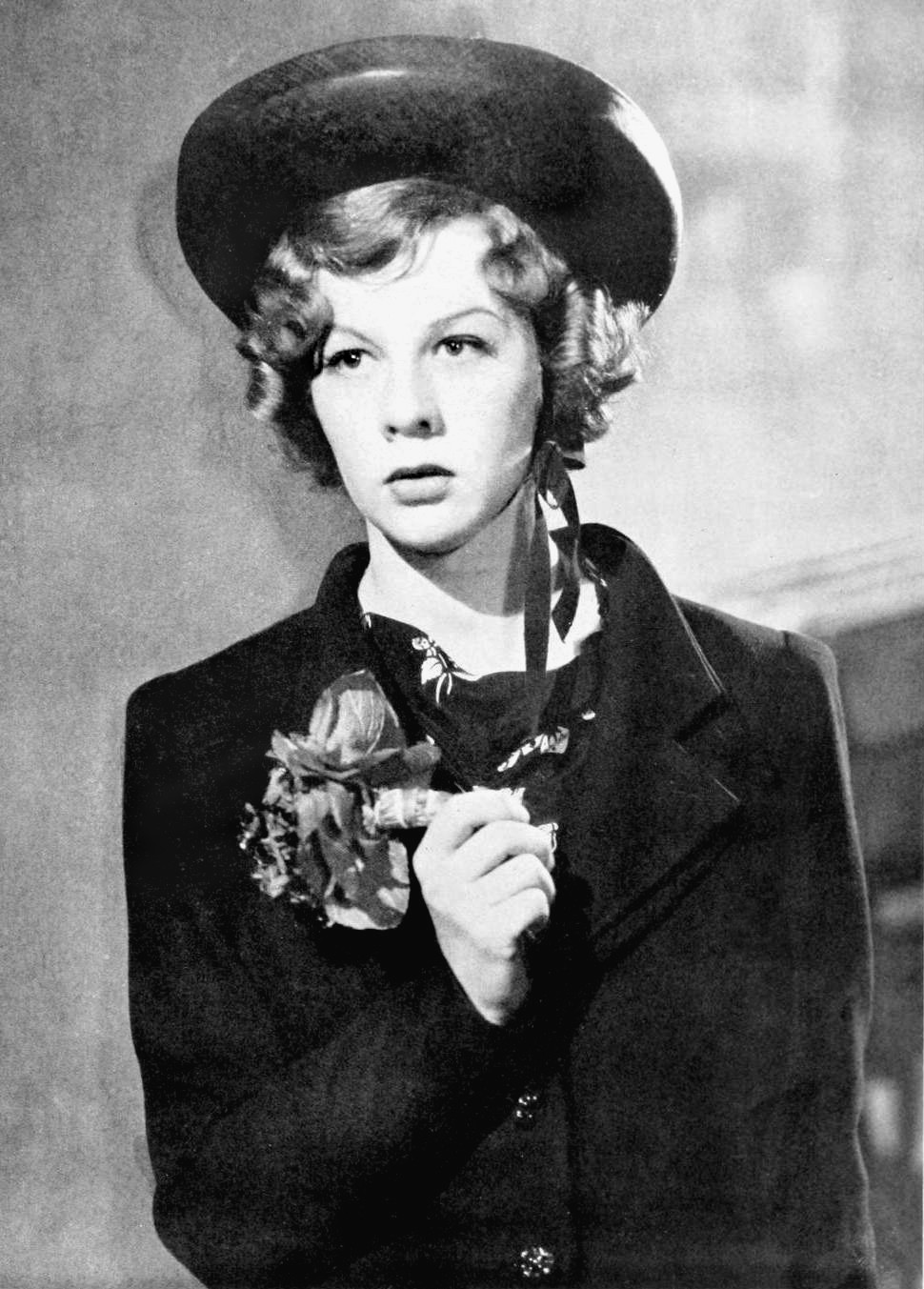
Wendy Hiller as Eliza Doolittle

Wendy Hiller was chosen by Shaw to play Eliza Doolittle after she had appeared in stage productions of Pygmalion and Saint Joan – though the film's initial credits stated that this movie was introducing her, she had in fact already appeared on film in 1937's Lancashire Luck. Shaw's choice for Higgins had been Charles Laughton. The movie also includes the very first film appearance (brief and uncredited) of Anthony Quayle, as an Italian wigmaker. Cathleen Nesbitt, credited here as Kathleen Nesbitt in the role of 'A Lady,' portrayed Mrs. Higgins in the original Broadway production of My Fair Lady 18 years later.

=== Staff ===
The film's behind the camera staff included David Lean (on his first major editing job; he also directed the montage sequence of Higgins teaching Eliza), set designer Laurence Irving and the camera operator Jack Hildyard (who later photographed Lean's The Bridge on the River Kwai, The Sound Barrier and Hobson's Choice).

== Reception ==
On Rotten Tomatoes, the film has an approval rating of 100%, based on 17 reviews.

== Awards ==
George Bernard Shaw, Cecil Lewis, Ian Dalrymple, and W. P. Lipscomb won the 1938 Academy Award for Writing (Adapted Screenplay). The film also received nominations for Best Picture, Best Actor (Howard) and Best Actress (Hiller). Shaw's reaction to his award was: "It's an insult for them to offer me any honour, as if they had never heard of me before – and it's very likely they never have. They might as well send some honour to George for being King of England." However, his friend Mary Pickford later reported seeing the award on display in his home.

At the 1938 Venice Film Festival, Leslie Howard won the Volpi Cup and the film was nominated for the Mussolini Cup.

== Copyright ==
The copyright of the film Pygmalion lapsed in the United States in 1966 after its rights holder, Metro-Goldwyn-Mayer, failed to renew its copyright registration; as a result, the film entered the public domain. However, in the 9th Circuit case Russell v. Price (1979), Shaw's estate was able to assert its rights in the underlying work (Shaw's play), and thus retain control over the film's distribution and public performance in the United States as a derivative work. US copyright in Shaw's play ended in 1988, which also reverted the film to public-domain status.

== Home media ==
A DVD (Cat. 1191) of the film was released in Australia by Flashback Entertainment.

== Bibliography ==
- The Great British Films, pp. 45–48, Jerry Vermilye, 1978, Citadel Press, ISBN 0-8065-0661-X
