= Charles Buchel =

British artist (1872–1950)

Charles Augustus Buchel
- Born: Karl August Büchel; 4 April 1872; Mainz, Prussia, German Empire
- Died: 1950 aged 78; London, England
- Known for: Painting

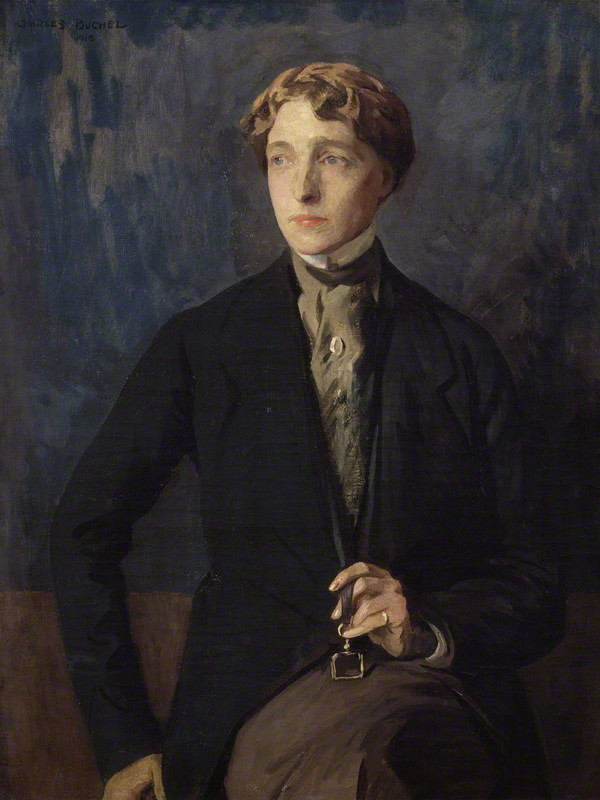
Radclyffe Hall, painted by Charles Buchel (1918)

Charles Buchel (Karl August Büchel) (1872–1950) was a British artist.

Buchel was born in Mainz, Germany, but immigrated to England as a child. Buchel studied art at the Royal Academy Schools. He was hired by the actor-manager, Herbert Beerbohm Tree in 1898, and worked with him for sixteen years.

Buchel painted several portraits of Tree, and also designed theatrical programmes and advertising posters for the theatre. He drew many illustrations for the theatre magazines of his day. Buchel is best remembered for having painted many of the stage stars of his era, including Lily Langtry, Henry Irving and George Alexander.

Buchel was married in Marylebone to Janet Edward Buyers in 1897. They had three sons: William Brian in 1900; Charles Anthony in 1903, who died as an infant; and Philip Stuart in 1906.

While the exact date is unknown, Charles Buchel died in 1950 at 78 years old. His life work can be found at the Museum of London, the National Portrait Gallery, RADA, the Royal Academy of Music, the Royal Shakespeare Theatre, the V&A, The Wilson and elsewhere.
