= Helen Maud Holt =

English actress (1863–1937)

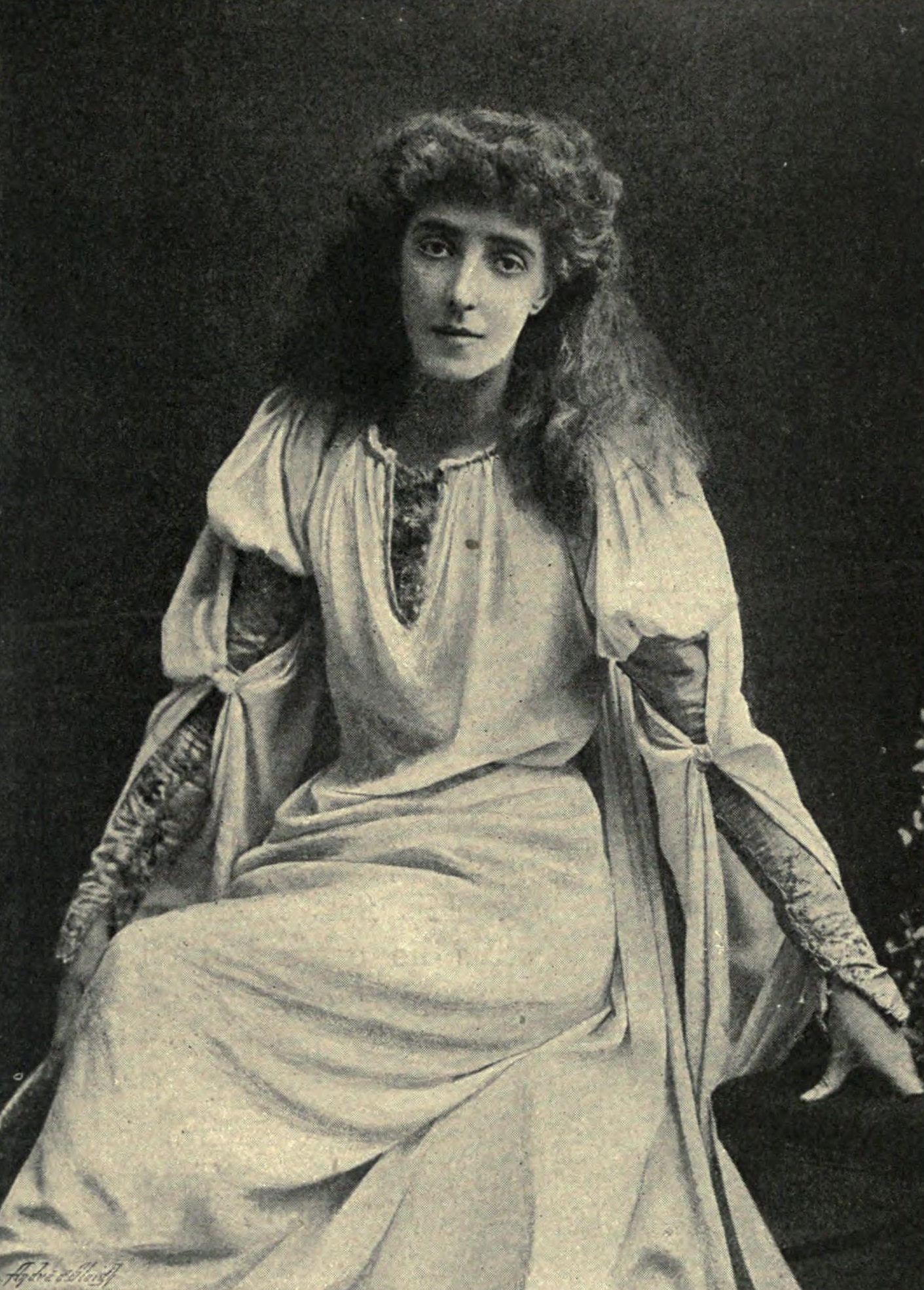
Mrs Beerbohm Tree as Ophelia in Hamlet

Helen Maud Holt (5 October 1863 – 7 August 1937), professionally known as Mrs Beerbohm Tree and later Lady Tree, was an English actress. She was the wife of the actor Sir Herbert Beerbohm Tree and the mother of Viola Tree, Felicity Tree and Iris Tree.

After early stage appearances beginning in 1883, Mrs Tree married and established a theatrical partnership with her husband, in which they appeared in revivals of classic plays and productions of new plays, first at the Theatre Royal, Haymarket and then at Her Majesty's Theatre. Her performances in serious roles were well received, but she was most celebrated for her work in comedy, from Shakespeare to new works by Wilde and others.

After her husband's death in 1917, Lady Tree continued to act steadily for almost two decades more until towards the end of her life, in plays and some films, making her last stage appearance in 1935.

== Life and career ==
=== Early years ===
Helen Maud Holt, aged 16

Holt was born in London, the daughter of William Holt. She was educated at Queen's College, London, taking high honours in classics, and making her stage debut in a student production of a Greek drama. Her professional debut was in January 1883, playing Jenny Northcott in a revival of Sweethearts, by W. S. Gilbert, at the Gaiety Theatre, London. Later that year, she married the young actor Herbert Beerbohm Tree. In May 1883, she played her first Shakespearean role, Olivia in Twelfth Night.

In September 1883, now billed under her married name, Mrs Beerbohm Tree, she had what The Times called "her first big hit" as Hester Gould in G. W. Godfrey's The Millionaire. The reviewer in The Times wrote, "Another excellent impersonation is the Hester Gould of Mrs Beerbohm Tree, a lady who, although new to the stage, has manifestly the temperament and artistic sense of a fine actress. The viperine qualities of this mysterious mischief-maker … are rendered by Mrs Beerbohm Tree with extraordinary incisiveness, and with a concentration of nervous force suggestive of Madame Sarah Bernhardt."

=== Partnership with Tree ===
1891 portrait

For the next four years, Mrs Tree appeared in a range of roles, including that of Maud in Tree's one-act play Six and Eightpence, but husband and wife did not appear in the same plays. In 1887, however, she joined Tree's company at the Theatre Royal, Haymarket, appearing with him in numerous roles. Under Tree's direction she played in works by Pinero, Grundy, Wilde, Sheridan and Shakespeare. I

Her husband opened the rebuilt Her Majesty's Theatre in 1887, where she then appeared under his direction, also assisting him in theatre management. In 1893, she created the role of Mrs Allonby in Wilde's A Woman of No Importance, opposite Tree's Lord Illingworth.

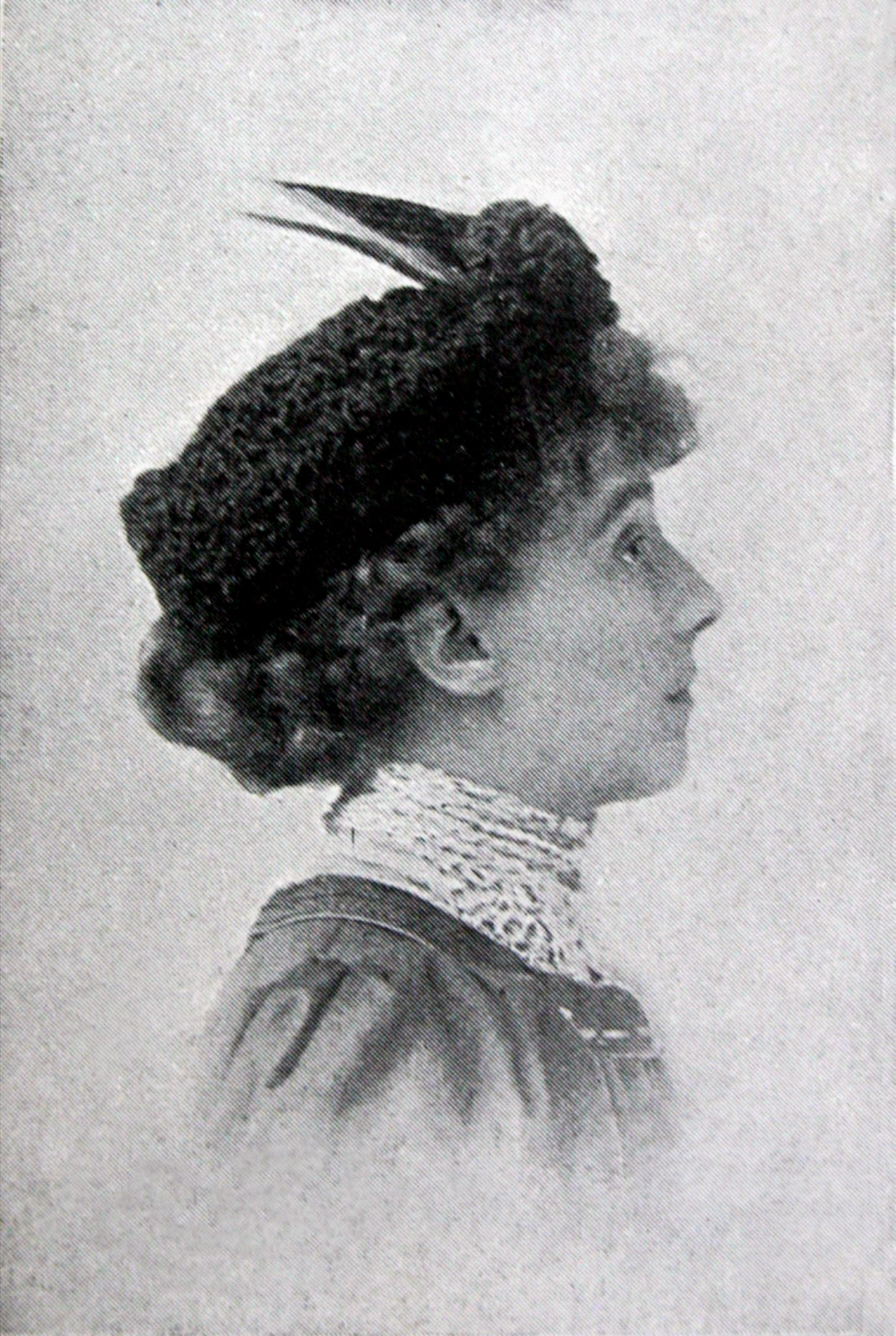
1895 Trip to America

Although most celebrated for her performances in contemporary comedies, Mrs Tree appeared with success in more serious roles, including Ophelia in Hamlet (1891, 1882, and 1905), Lady Percy in Henry IV, Part 1, Calpurnia in Julius Caesar (1900), Gertrude in Hamlet (1905), and Portia in Julius Caesar (1911).

In Shakespearean comedy she was well known for her appearances in The Merry Wives of Windsor, in which at various stages in her career she played the juvenile lead, Ann Page, and then both of the merry wives in different productions. Other Shakespeare roles were Titania in A Midsummer Night's Dream (1900), Beatrice in Much Ado About Nothing (1905), and Mistress Quickly in Henry IV, Part 1 (1935).

Although "fond of joking about her comparative importance as Mrs Tree and later as Lady Tree", she was, according to The Manchester Guardian "a witty woman, and by no means an unimportant actress." She exercised discreet influence on Tree's career, persuading him in 1898 that he should play Marc Antony in Julius Caesar, rather than Brutus as he had intended. The effectiveness of her advice was shown when, in the words of The Times, the production "made the name of Tree famous throughout the theatrical world."

Both Tree and his wife were enthusiastic participants in the new medium of filmed drama. She appeared in Still Waters Run Deep (1916), Little Dorrit (1920), Such is the Law (1930), Wedding Rehearsal (1932), Early to Bed, The Girl from Maxim's (1933), The Private Life of Henry VIII and Her Imaginary Lover (all in 1933), and The Man Who Could Work Miracles (1936).

=== Later years ===
Tree died in 1917. His wife continued acting after his death, working until almost the end of her life 20 years later. Among the roles for which she was most celebrated were Lady Teazle in The School for Scandal and Mrs Malaprop in The Rivals, one of the highlights of her later career. Her colleague John Martin Harvey said of her, "In her latter years she created a distinct type of acting so clever that no one was able to imitate it."

Lady Tree's last stage appearances were in 1935, as Mistress Quickly to George Robey's Falstaff at His Majesty's Theatre, and as the Duchess of Stroud in Our Own Lives at the Ambassadors Theatre, with Irene Vanbrugh. A volume of correspondence between Maud and her literary, business and family contacts was edited and published by Susana Cory-Wright (nee Torrents dels Prats), the ex-wife of her great grandson, Anthony Jonathan Cory-Wright, titled Lady Tree: A Theatrical Life in Letters (2012).

She died at University College Hospital, London, after an operation, at age 73.

== Filmography ==
| Year | Title | Role | Notes |
|---|---|---|---|
| 1916 | Still Waters Run Deep | Mrs. Sternhold | |
| 1920 | Little Dorrit | Mrs. Clenman | |
| 1930 | Such Is the Law | Granny | |
| 1932 | Wedding Rehearsal | the Countess of Stokeshire | |
| 1933 | The Private Life of Henry VIII | The King's Nurse | |
| 1933 | The Girl from Maxim's | Madame Petypon | |
| 1933 | Early to Bed | Widow Seidelblast | |
| 1933 | Her Imaginary Lover | Grandma | |
| 1936 | The Man Who Could Work Miracles | Grigsby's Housekeeper | (final film role) |

== Sources ==
- Cory-Wright, Susana (2012). Lady Tree: A Theatrical Life in Letters. Raleigh, NC: Lulu. ISBN 978-1-291-09670-5.
