= French Without Tears (film) =

1939 film

- Film poster
- Directed by: Anthony Asquith
- Written by: Ian Dalrymple; Anatole de Grunwald; Terence Rattigan
- Produced by: Mario Zampi
- Starring: Ray Milland
- Cinematography: Bernard Knowles
- Edited by: David Lean
- Music by: Nicholas Brodszky; Clive Richardson (uncredited)
- Production company: Two Cities Films
- Distributed by: Paramount Pictures
- Release date: 1939
- Running time: 86 minutes
- Country: United Kingdom
- Language: English

French Without Tears is a 1939 British comedy film directed by Anthony Asquith and starring Ray Milland. It was written by Ian Dalrymple, Anatole de Grunwald and Terence Rattigan based on Rattigan's 1936 play of the same name.

An on-off working relationship between Asquith and Rattigan began with this film and continued over the next 15 years.

== Plot ==
Three young Englishmen at a language "cramming" school in the south of France have love affairs. Diana, the sister of one of the boys, arrives in town to flirt with all of her brothers' schoolmates.

== Cast ==
- Ray Milland as Alan Howard
- Ellen Drew as Diana Lake
- Janine Darcey as Jacqueline Maingot
- David Tree as Chris Neilan
- Roland Culver as Cmdr. Bill Rogers
- Guy Middleton as Brian Curtis
- Kenneth Morgan as Kenneth Lake
- Margaret Yarde as Marianne
- Toni Gable as Chi-Chi
- Jim Gérald as Professor Maingot
- Mantovani as himself, orchestra leader
- Michael Duffield as Lieutenant Commander Rogers

== Critical reception ==
According to Kinematograph Weekly the film did well at the British box office in February 1940.

The Monthly Film Bulletin wrote: "This airy trifle of sex mingled with farce is a caricature put over in exactly the right spirit. Anthony Asquith's direction is brilliant. It is gay, irresponsible, with piquant situations and dialogue made to seem even funnier than it really is by perfect timing. An admirably chosen cast contributes largely to the entertaining result."

Kinematograph Weekly wrote: "Piquant and provocative comedy of manners, adapted . with irresistible lightness of touch from Terrence Rartiguns stage best-seller. ... Good laughs, ambitious staging, clever and polished team work, star values and box-office title."

Sky Movies described a "sparkling version of Terence Rattigan's comedy play. The import of Ellen Drew and Ray Milland from Hollywood ensured the film's success world-wide."

Writing for Allmovie, Hal Erickson wrote, "much of the wit and zest of the original stage production has been blunted for the screen, moving one critic to describe French Without Tears as 'Comedy Without Laughs'. In all fairness, however, the film does boast a hilarious drunk scene in a musty old French wine cellar."
