= Scott Sunderland (actor) =

English actor (1883–1956)

- Born: 19 September 1883; Rock Ferry, Cheshire, England
- Died: 12 December 1956 (age 73 years); Malvern, Worcestershire, UK
- Years active: 1909–1945
- Partner: Sir Barry Jackson

Harry Scott Sunderland (19 September 1883 – 12 December 1956) was an English actor. Principally working on the stage, his few film roles included Colonel Pickering in the 1938 film adaptation of Shaw's Pygmalion and Sir John Colley in the 1939 film adaptation of Goodbye, Mr. Chips.

== Life ==
Educated in England and Germany, his first professional theatrical appearance was with the F.R. Benson company at Stratford-upon-Avon in 1909 as Douglas in Henry IV, Part 2, followed later that year with his London debut. Other roles he played during his stage career included Feste in Twelfth Night, Ulysses S. Grant in Abraham Lincoln, Peter Dais in North of the Moon, Petruchio in The Taming of the Shrew' (during his late forties in the late 1920s), and several of George Bernard Shaw's plays (including The Apple Cart).

His stage experience of Shaw and his move to 'grand old man' roles by the late 1930s led to his being cast in the 1938 film of Pygmalion as Colonel Pickering and in the 1939 film of Goodbye, Mr. Chips. He appeared in Here's to Our Enterprise, a one-night show in May 1938 based on Henry Irving's life (as part of the celebrations surrounding the centenary of Irving's birth) and, though this marked his last major appearance on the London stage, also performed in revivals and new work for the Birmingham Repertory Company between 1942 and 1945 before retiring in the late 1940s. He was gay and his life-long partner was the director, Sir Barry Jackson.

== Filmography ==
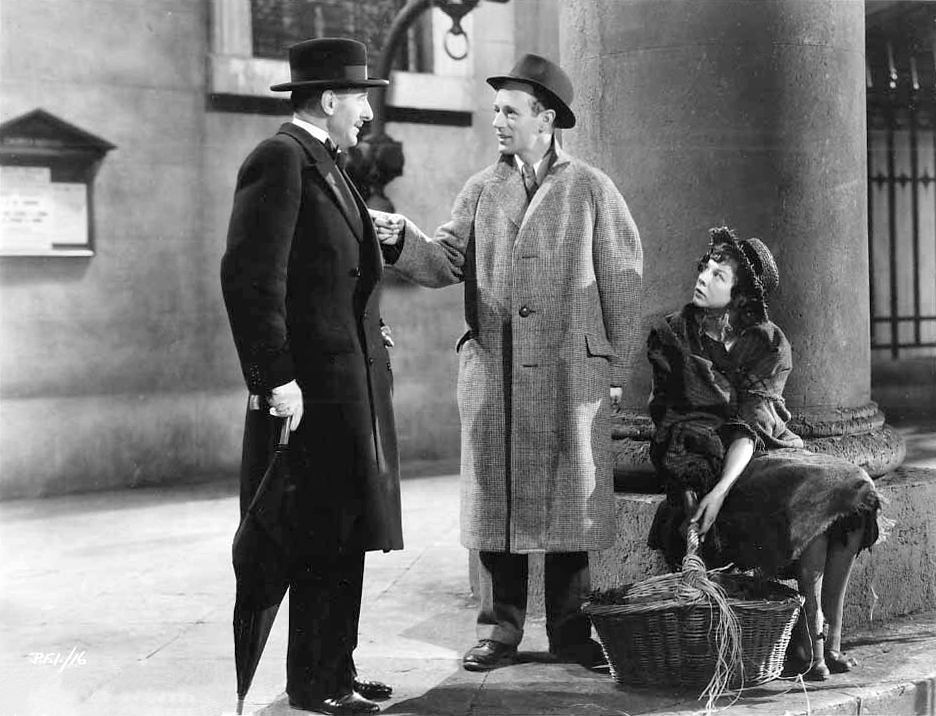
Scott Sunderland, Leslie Howard and Wendy Hiller in Pygmalion (1938)

Year	Title	Role	Notes
1938	Pygmalion	Colonel George Pickering	Film debut
1939	Goodbye, Mr. Chips	Sir John Colley	Final film
