= Julius Beerbohm =

British engineer and explorer (1854–1906)

Beerbohm in a painting by Anders Zorn

Julius Beerbohm (26 September 1854 – 21 April 1906) was a Victorian travel-writer, engineer and explorer.

He was the son of Julius Ewald Edward Beerbohm (1811–1892), of Dutch, Lithuanian, and German origin, who had come to England in about 1830 and set up as a corn merchant. He married an Englishwoman, Constantia Draper, and the couple had four children. Beerbohm's older brother was the actor-manager Herbert Beerbohm Tree; his sister was author Constance Beerbohm. A younger half-brother was the caricaturist and parodist Max Beerbohm. His half-sister Agnes Mary Beerbohm (1865–1949), who became Mrs Ralph Neville in 1884, was a friend of the artist Walter Sickert and modelled for him in his 1906 painting Fancy Dress. His nieces were Viola, Felicity and Iris Tree.

== Travels in Patagonia ==
A European engineer, Beerbohm travelled to Patagonia in 1877 as part of a group sent to survey the land between Port Desire and Santa Cruz. His 1881 book Wanderings in Patagonia; or, Life among the Ostrich Hunters is the account of the time he spent there. In the book he describes the natural history and geography of the country that he labelled "the last of nature's works".

Beerbohm travelled across deserts and through jungles with the native Indians, the people Ferdinand Magellan had come upon in 1520 when he discovered the country. Beerbohm details a trek through the hostile terrain and overcomes snowstorms and mutiny, survives a flood and encounters ostrich hunters, puma, and swans. Beerbohm had no previous knowledge of the land, its flora and fauna. For the most part of the journey he travelled with several old hands at ostrich hunting: the memorable Isidro, the Frenchman Guillaume, and the Austrian Maximo.

In several chapters of the book the group is stuck on the north side of the Rio Gallegos which was experiencing a severe flood. The group split up, with Beerbohm and Guillaume venturing a dangerous crossing that almost drowned Beerbohm. When they finally arrived in Sandy Point, the local prison, along with its military guard, mutinied, got drunk, and took over the town, killing many of its citizens.

Beerbohm's Patagonia sketches provided the basis for the illustrations for Lady Florence Dixie's Across Patagonia (1881).

== Character ==
In a volume of reminiscences collected on the death of Herbert Beerbohm Tree by Max Beerbohm, Herbert's widow Helen Maud Tree recalled Julius:

It was in the autumn of 1882 that I first met Julius, (Herbert's younger brother Max, their half-brother was then a little boy of ten). Julius was a brilliant creature, exquisite and elusive: a poet and a dreamer. His poetry was of the soul: his dreams, alas! were of the earth. He was a potential millionaire, and from time to time, one would have said, an actual one. But, over and over again, some bright El Dorado would fade before his vision. Fortunes came quickly, and as quickly were engulfed in new and glittering enterprises. Throughout his eager, hunted life triumph and disaster followed one another in quick succession; but I never saw him – even when misfortunes were huddling on his back – otherwise than calm, perfectly accoutred and equipped, fastidious, fantastic, fascinating and debonair. When I first knew him he was either engaged to that graceful and gracious being, Mrs Younghusband, or they were just married. He brought her, Evelyn, to see us at Old Burlington Street. She had (has to this day) great beauty, charm and distinction, a lovely way of speaking, lovely manners, and a gentle and rare disposition.

After their marriage, they lived in great splendour at Almond's Hotel, and I remember dinner parties where not the decoration but the tablecloth itself was fashioned of Parma violets, and where food and wine were of the nature of a Sybarite's feast. After such Lucullus' feasts, we would sometimes repair to our rooms, where Julius would make me sing "Crépuscule," and where he would also sing, read us his poems or tell us stories of his travels. His was an enchanting personality, and Herbert's pride and joy in him were immense. In their stern and cruel school-days Herbert had been the stronger of the two, the most able to endure; therefore his had been the task to temper hardships to his little brother; and who would accomplish this task so tenderly or with such love and understanding as Herbert? Both brothers, while remembering with delight the beauty of the Thuringian land in spring and summer, recalled with shuddering dislike the iron system of their German school.

With his wife he had two children: Clarence Evelyn Beerbohm (1885–1917), a musical comedy actor and soldier who married Elizabeth H. Anderson in 1909 and who was killed in action during World War I; and Marie Marguerite Beerbohm (born 1890), who married Ernest Alexander Stuart Watt (1874 - 1954) on 22 February 1912 at the register office, Hanover Square. The marriage was dissolved in 1913.

Beerbohm spent much of his time travelling around Europe losing all his money at casino after casino. Every now and then he would try to recoup his lost money by thinking up some project, such as an idea to dredge the River Nile to attempt to find the lost jewels of the Pharaohs, or setting up a luxury hotel at Marienbad. This latter was a short-lived venture for after paying the deposit on the hotel Beerbohm left Germany and totally forgot about the entire enterprise until reminded of it by his creditors. He soon lost all of his money and much of his wife's also, and could only continue to live to the standard to which he had become accustomed by borrowing from others. Although facing financial ruin, he continued to keep cabs waiting for him all day at his door, and to attend supper parties where he would entertain the company by reciting one of his poems. He wrote the words to a song, Blue-Eyes, Berceuse, which was set to music by Lord Duppin. He had his linen sent from his London home to Paris to be washed.

As he lay dying in April 1906, "exhausted by a life of adventure and failure", Beerbohm managed to maintain the strict standards of his dandyism. His brother Herbert Beerbohm Tree came to see him dressed in a reddish-brown suit that offended Julius's taste. "Ginger!" he said disgustedly, and turned his face to the wall.

== See also ==
- Beerbohm family
