= Iris Tree =

English poet, actress, and art model (1897–1968)

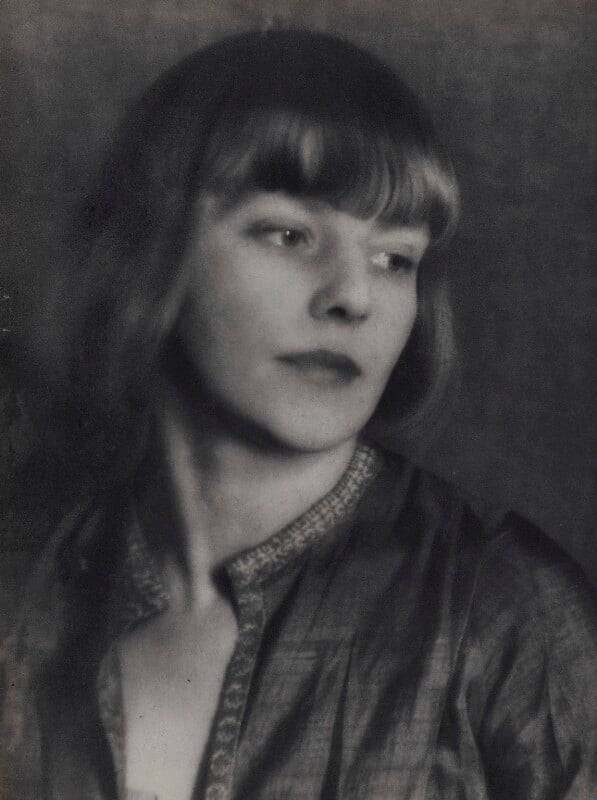
Iris Tree in 1923

Iris Tree (27 January 1897 – 13 April 1968) was an English poet, actress, and art model, described as a bohemian, an eccentric, a wit, and an adventurer.

== Biography ==
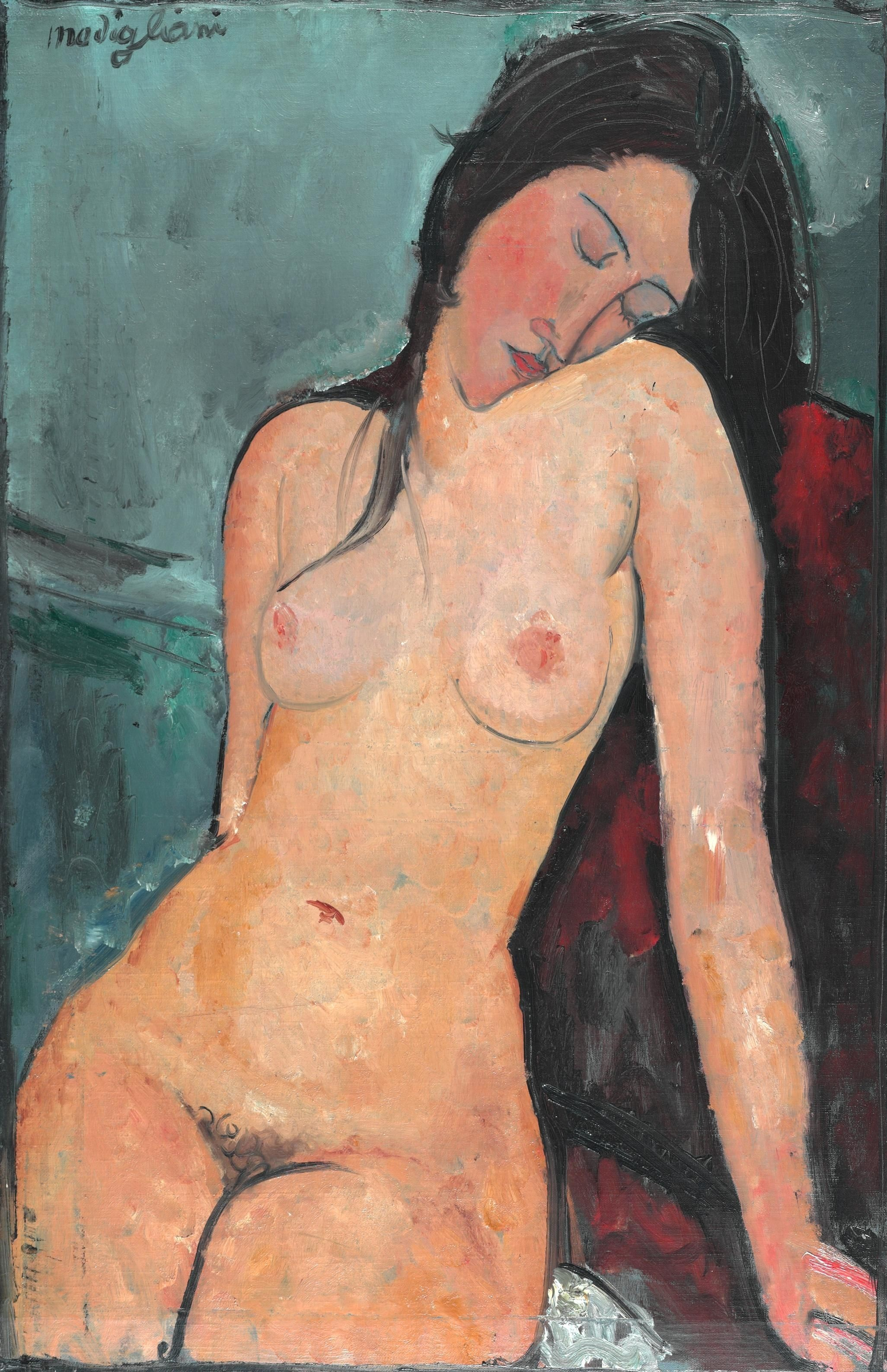
Tree was the model for this c. 1916 painting by Amedeo Modigliani.

Iris Tree's parents were actors Sir Herbert Beerbohm Tree and Helen Maud, Lady Tree. Her sisters were actresses Felicity and Viola Tree. An aunt was author Constance Beerbohm, and her uncles were explorer and author Julius Beerbohm and caricaturist and parodist Max Beerbohm.

Iris was sought after as an art model while a young woman, being painted by Augustus John, simultaneously by Duncan Grant, Vanessa Bell, and Roger Fry, and sculpted by Jacob Epstein, showing her bobbed hair (she was said to have cut off the rest and left it on a train) that, along with other behaviour, caused much scandal. The Epstein sculpture as of 2000 was displayed at the Tate Britain. She was often photographed by Man Ray, was friends with Nancy Cunard for a time, and acted alongside Diana Cooper in the mid-1920s.

Iris studied at the Slade School of Art. She contributed verse to the 1917 Sitwell anthology Wheels; her published collections were Poems (1919), The Traveller and other Poems (1927), and The Marsh Picnic (1966).

Iris married twice. Her first marriage was to Curtis Moffat, a New York artist; Ivan Moffat, the screenwriter, was their son. She came to America to act in Karl Vollmöller's play The Miracle in 1925, and there met her second husband, the actor and ex-officer of the Austrian cavalry, Count Friedrich von Ledebur. The two roamed around California with their son before moving back to Europe, where they were involved in the Chekhov Theatre Studio. After their divorce, they both appeared in the 1956 film version of Moby Dick. She also appeared as a poet, essentially as herself, in Federico Fellini's La Dolce Vita (1960).

== See also ==
- Beerbohm family
