= Curtis Moffat =

American abstract photographer, painter and modernist interior designer

Edwin Curtis Moffat (October 11, 1887 – 1949) was a London-based American abstract photographer, painter and modernist interior designer.

Moffat studied painting in New York and in Paris before exhibiting his work in New York during World War I. He married the actress and poet Iris Tree, and the couple moved to London after the war, where Moffat took up abstract photography. He collaborated with Man Ray and Cecil Beaton on numerous occasions throughout his career. He opened a photographic studio in London in 1925. Four years later, he opened an interior design showroom and gallery, displaying a combination of modern, antique and African tribal furnishings. His home became a popular salon for artists, intellectuals and gourmands.

He moved back to America in 1939 with his second wife, settling on Martha's Vineyard, where he continued to paint.

== Early years ==
Moffat was born in Brooklyn in 1887 into a wealthy New York City family, the son of Edwin Curtis Moffat Sr. (1853–1931) and Aline Adelaide Graves. Moffat moved to Brittany, France with his parents at an early age before being educated at St. Mark's School in the U.S.

After a brief diplomatic career early in the new century, he studied painting in New York and was part of a group of artists including George Bellows, Robert Henri and John French Sloan. In 1913–1914, he studied at the Beaux arts in Paris. One man shows of his work were held in New York in 1916 and 1919. In 1916, he married actress-poet Iris Tree, the daughter of actor-manager Sir Herbert Beerbohm Tree, in New York. A son, Ivan, born in Cuba in 1918, became a screenwriter.

After World War I ended, Moffat and his wife settled in London, and he became interested in photography. In 1923 he went to Paris where he was involved with the Surrealists and the Dada movement. He collaborated with Man Ray, with whom he developed "painting with light" 'Rayogram' compositions and other experimental techniques. In 1925 he opened a photographic studio with Olivia Wyndham in London called the "M Studio". His large and striking black and white portraits of friends such as the Sitwells, Lady Diana Cooper, Augustus John and Nancy Cunard influenced Cecil Beaton, among others. Two exhibitions of his photographs were held in London in 1925 and 1926.

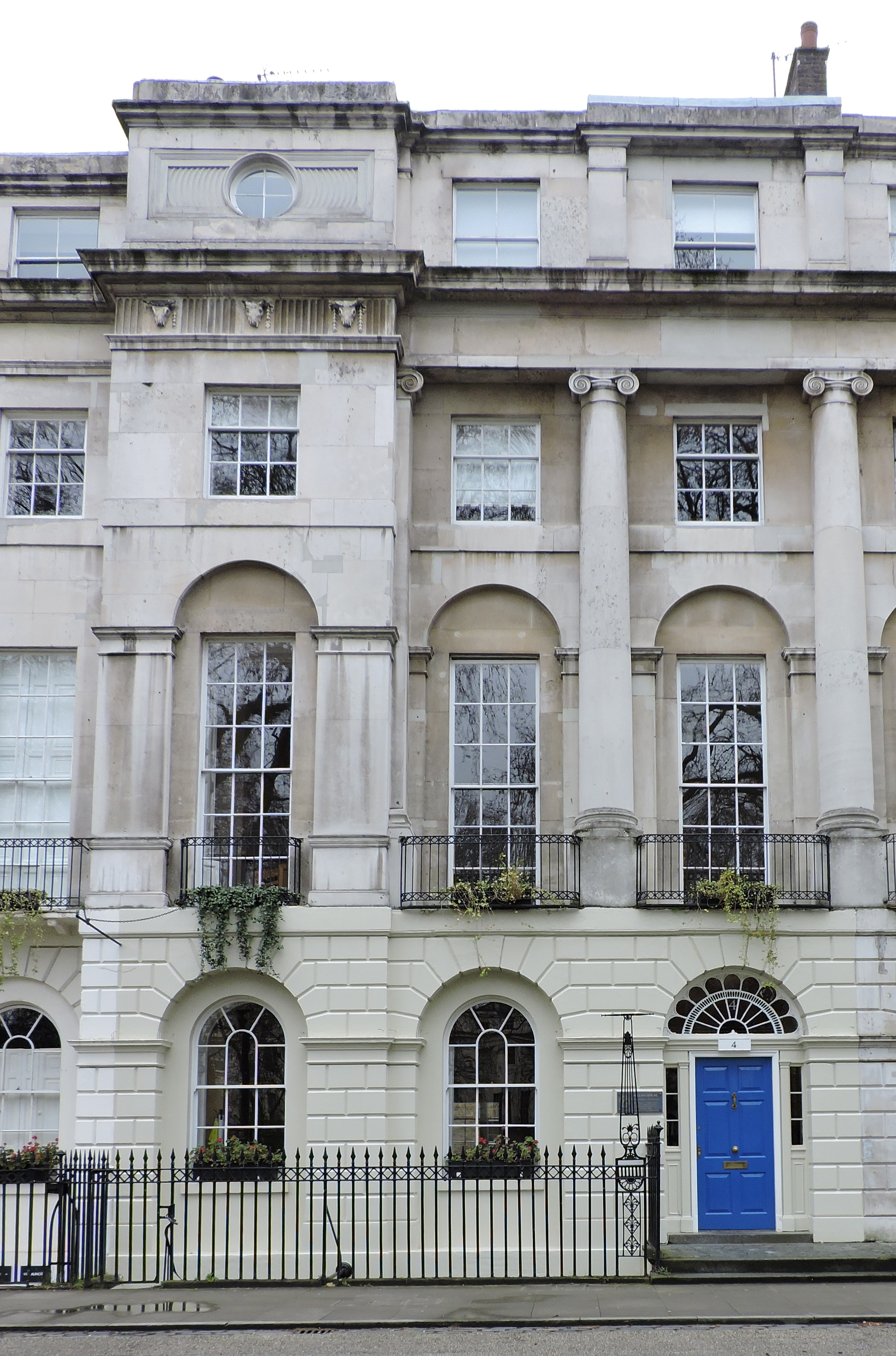
No 4 Fitzroy Square, London (2015), Formerly the gallery of Curtis Moffat Ltd.

== Interior design ==
In 1929, financed by the American millionaire Jock Whitney, he opened a gallery, Curtis Moffat Ltd., at 4 Fitzroy Square in London. Two adjoining houses were converted into showrooms with a flat above designed by the architect Frederick Etchells. The showrooms combined modern interior design and lighting with one of the first major collections of African tribal sculpture in London. Objects for sale ranged from 16th century antiques to rugs by Edward McKnight Kauffer and Marion Dorn, and modern china, silver and glass. The insides of the cupboard doors were painted by Francis Wyndham.

Moffat undertook interior design commissions, often collaborating with John Duncan Miller. In 1930 one of the rooms was converted to a picture gallery and run by Freddie Mayor. Opening with a show of work by Augustus John, Vanessa Bell and Duncan Grant among others, its last show, "Since Cezanne", featured artists such as Picasso, Matisse and Modigliani. In 1933, due to the Great Depression, financial backing was withdrawn and the gallery closed.

== Later years ==
Moffat continued to live and work at Fitzroy Square. He and Iris Tree had been divorced in 1932. He returned to portrait photography and also undertook commercial colour photography. He began experimenting with the complex and delicate carbro three colour process. A one-man show of his colour photographs, "Still Lifes and Compositions with Light", was held at the Mayor Gallery in 1925. His work was included in the Museum of Modern Art exhibition "Photography 1839–1937". On 16 April 1936 in London, he married Kathleen Allan, who had worked with him for some years in his studio. The couple had a daughter, Penelope, in 1938.

Moffat's original and eclectic taste in art and design also extended into the area of gastronomy. He was an early member of the Wine and Food Society and the Saintsbury Club, and a close friend of André Simon. His table was famous for its wine and food, the choice of the latter being governed by his selection of the former, according to his son, Ivan. His large house in Fitzroy Square, perhaps the first and most original of the so-called modern interiors of the late Twenties and early Thirties, was the meeting place for many of the celebrated painters, writers, critics and designers of the day.

Early in 1939, Moffat returned to New York where he held a one-man show of his paintings. He and his family then settled on Martha's Vineyard in 1940, where he continued to paint until he died in 1949 in Edgartown, Massachusetts, on the Vineyard. His photographic archive and papers relating to his gallery, Curtis Moffat Ltd., are held and exhibited in the Victoria and Albert Museum in London. A book, edited by Martin Barnes with essays by Mark Haworth-Booth and James Stevenson, Curtis Moffat: Silver Society. Experimental Photography and Design, 1923–1935, was published by the V&A and Steidl Publishers, in 2016.
