= Viola Tree =

British actress and singer (1884–1938)

Viola Tree (17 July 1884 – 15 November 1938) was an English actress, singer, playwright and author. Daughter of the actor Herbert Beerbohm Tree, she made many of her early appearances with his company at His Majesty's Theatre. Later she appeared in opera, variety, straight theatre and film.

Tree made her London debut in 1904 as Viola in Twelfth Night, and for the next four years she appeared in her father's productions at His Majesty's Theatre, often in Shakespeare roles. She yearned to have an operatic career, and studied in Milan, but sang only two opera roles; she then resumed her career in plays and in variety. In 1919, she became manager of the Aldwych Theatre, while continuing her acting career.

In 1930–31 she played on Broadway and on tour in drama and appeared in the Ziegfeld Follies. In London in the 1930s, she played in comedies and tried her hand at directing. Her last West End role was in The Melody that Got Lost in 1938. She also appeared in four films between 1920 and 1938, wrote two plays and several books, including a novel and a book of etiquette.

== Biography ==
Tree was born in London, the eldest of three daughters of Herbert Beerbohm Tree and his wife, the actress Helen Maud Tree, née Holt. Her aunt was author Constance Beerbohm and an uncle was Max Beerbohm. She was educated privately in London and in Europe. Her sisters were Felicity Tree and Iris Tree. She also had seven illegitimate half-siblings, the products of her father's many infidelities, among them the director Carol Reed and Peter Reed, whose son became the actor Oliver Reed.

=== Stage and film career ===
Originally, Tree planned a career as a singer, but entered the family profession in 1904. She made a very successful London debut in March 1904 as Viola in Twelfth Night. For the next four years she appeared in her father's productions at His Majesty's Theatre. Her other Shakespeare roles included Hero in Much Ado about Nothing, the Queen in Richard II, Ariel in The Tempest, Anne Page in The Merry Wives of Windsor, Ophelia in Hamlet and Perdita in The Winter's Tale, in which Ellen Terry played Hermione.

1907 drawing by John Singer Sargent

Tree continued to plan an operatic career, and after making a success in the title role of Iphigénie en Tauride and as Euridice in Orfeo ed Euridice at the Savoy Theatre in 1910, she went to Milan to study. On her return, however, she did not pursue her operatic ambitions, except for playing Euridice again in 1912. Instead, she continued to build her stage career in plays and in variety. In 1912, Tree married a drama critic, Alan Leonard Romaine Parsons, who died in 1933, aged 44. They had two sons, actor David Tree and Denys Parsons, father of musician Alan Parsons, and a daughter Virginia Penelope Parsons (1917–2003), wife of David Tennant and then the 6th Marquess of Bath.

In 1919, Tree took over the management of the Aldwych Theatre, scoring particular success with the works of Sacha Guitry. Her last Shakespeare role was Helena in A Midsummer Night's Dream in 1923. In 1930–31 she was in the US, appearing on Broadway and on tour in drama and also appeared in the Ziegfeld Follies. Through the 1930s, Tree continually played in light comedies in the West End, varied with occasional unorthodox undertakings. In 1930 she directed an Italian play, La Piccola by Massimo Bontempelli, in the original Italian, and in 1934 she directed Jean-Philippe Rameau's opera Castor et Pollux for the Oxford University Opera Club. In 1931 she starred in the play with music For the Love of Mike, and starred in the works' film adaptation in 1932.

Tree's last West End appearance was in The Melody that Got Lost, "a comedy with music", in January 1938. She was an early and strong supporter of the foundation of a National Theatre.

Tree also played in four films between 1920 and 1938, the last of which, Pygmalion, by George Bernard Shaw (1938), completed three generations of the Tree family's connection with premieres of versions of the play: Tree's father created the role of Henry Higgins in the London stage première in 1914; Viola Tree revived the play in 1920; and she played a cameo role in the film, in which her son David Tree played Freddy.

=== Writing ===
In 1923 The Dancers, a play written by Tree in collaboration with the actor-manager Gerald du Maurier under the joint pen name of Hubert Parsons, opened at Wyndham's Theatre, starring Tallulah Bankhead in her London début. It ran for 349 performances and subsequently transferred to the Broadhurst Theatre on Broadway, where it lasted for 133 performances. She wrote a second play, The Swallow, about decent people coping with the rise of Italian Fascism, produced in London in 1925. Tree published several books: her memoirs, Castles in the Air (1926); a book of etiquette advice, Can I Help You? (1937); a novel; a biography of her husband; and an anthology, Alan Parsons' Book (1937).

Tree died of pleurisy in London, aged 54.

== Filmography ==
| Year | Title | Role | Notes |
|---|---|---|---|
| 1917 | Masks and Faces | Member of Rich's Company #4 | |
| 1920 | Unmarried | | |
| 1932 | For the Love of Mike | Emma Miller | |
| 1935 | Heart's Desire | Lady Bennington | |
| 1938 | Pygmalion | Perfide Social Reporter | (final film role) |

== See also ==
- Beerbohm family

== Sources ==
- Wearing, J. P. The London Stage 1920–1929: A Calendar of Productions, Performers, and Personnel. Rowman & Littlefield (2014).
