= Bierbaum =

Bierbaum is a German surname. Notable people with the surname include:

- Otto Julius Bierbaum (1865–1910), German writer
- Rosina Bierbaum (born 1952), dean of the University of Michigan School of Natural Resources and Environment
- Tom and Mary Bierbaum (born 1956, 1955, respectively), married couple known for their work in Legion of Super-Heroes
- Veronica M. Bierbaum, American chemist

== See also ==
- Bierbaum am Auersbach, municipal district in Austria
