= Felicity Tree =

English baronetess and socialite (1894–1978)

Felicity Tree at her wedding to Sir Geoffrey Cory-Wright in 1915

Felicity Constance Tree, Lady Cory-Wright, (7 December 1894 – 15 September 1978) was an English baronetess and high society figure. A daughter of the actors Sir Herbert Beerbohm Tree and Helen Maud Holt, she appeared regularly in news of the time starting from infancy.

== Early life ==
Born in Chelsea, London, in 1894, Tree was the middle daughter of the actor Sir Herbert Beerbohm Tree and his wife, the actress Helen Maud Holt. She was the sister of Viola Tree and Iris Tree, and the niece of the author Constance Beerbohm, the caricaturist and parodist Max Beerbohm, and the engineer and explorer Julius Beerbohm. Her grandson is Richard Cory-Wright, 4th Baronet Cory-Wright.

Tree was involved in the theatre and society at an early age. In 1908, she was praised in The Bystander for her leading role in a play by Mrs. Walter Cave, The Three Wishes, opposite the daughter of the British Prime Minister, H. H. Asquith. She was later pictured in The Sketch wearing her costume; the paper reported that the performances benefited the National Society for the Prevention of Cruelty to Children. At the Shakespeare Ball in London in 1911, The New York Times noted that she appeared with her family and dressed as Juliet from Romeo and Juliet. In 1912, The Evening News reported that Tree sold programmes at the Keats-Shelley Memorial matinees at the Haymarket Theatre.

She was presented at the court by Margot Asquith in 1913, and she wore a white satin gown with a rose pink train made of tulle and lace. From as far away as California, the press commented on her attendance, with her sister Iris, at a fancy dress costume ball in 1913. The same year, she went in ancient Greek-style dress to the Picture Ball at Royal Albert Hall. In 1914 she sang a role in the cantata La Damoiselle élue at the French embassy in London. The same year, she attended the Picture Ball at Albert Hall and was profiled in the Kingston Gleaner, which wrote that "she has inherited a great sense of humour from her famous father." Later in 1914 she trained as a nurse at St Bartholomew's Hospital, having been a life saver from 1908, when she passed the tests provided by the Royal Life Saving Society in 1908.

== Marriage and later years ==
Tree married Sir Geoffrey Cory-Wright, 3rd Baronet Cory-Wright, son of Sir Arthur Cory-Wright, 2nd Bt, and Elizabeth Olive Clothier, on 10 November 1915. Because of the celebrity of her father, the World War I wedding was filmed, showing the bride leaving with Sir Herbert Beerbohm Tree from the parental home and arriving at the church, and the bride and groom leaving the church. The couple had five sons: Anthony (1916–1944); Michael Cory-Wright (1920–1997); David (1925–2009); Jonathan (1925–1945) and Mark (1930–2004). Two of them, Captain Anthony John Julian Cory-Wright and Lieutenant Jonathan Francis Cory-Wright, were killed in action during World War II. Anthony's son, Richard, inherited the Baronetcy.

Tree was a member of the Ladies Stage Golfing Society, founded in 1921, and won the inaugural contest. Through golf she met the future Labour Party leader Hugh Gaitskell, whose first love she became.

She died at her home in Brancaster, Norfolk, at the age of eighty-three.

A volume of correspondence by or to Tree's mother Maud, including by family members, was edited and published by Susana Cory-Wright (nee Prats), the wife of Tree's grandson, Anthony Jonathan Cory-Wright, titled Lady Tree: A Theatrical Life in Letters (2012).

== See also ==
- Beerbohm family

== Sources ==
- Brivati, Brian (1996). Hugh Gaitskell. London: Richard Cohen. ISBN 978-1-86066-073-3.
- Cory-Wright, Susana (2012). Lady Tree: A Theatrical Life in Letters. Raleigh, NC: Lulu. ISBN 978-1-291-09670-5.
