= Herbert Beerbohm Tree =

English actor and theatre manager (1852–1917)

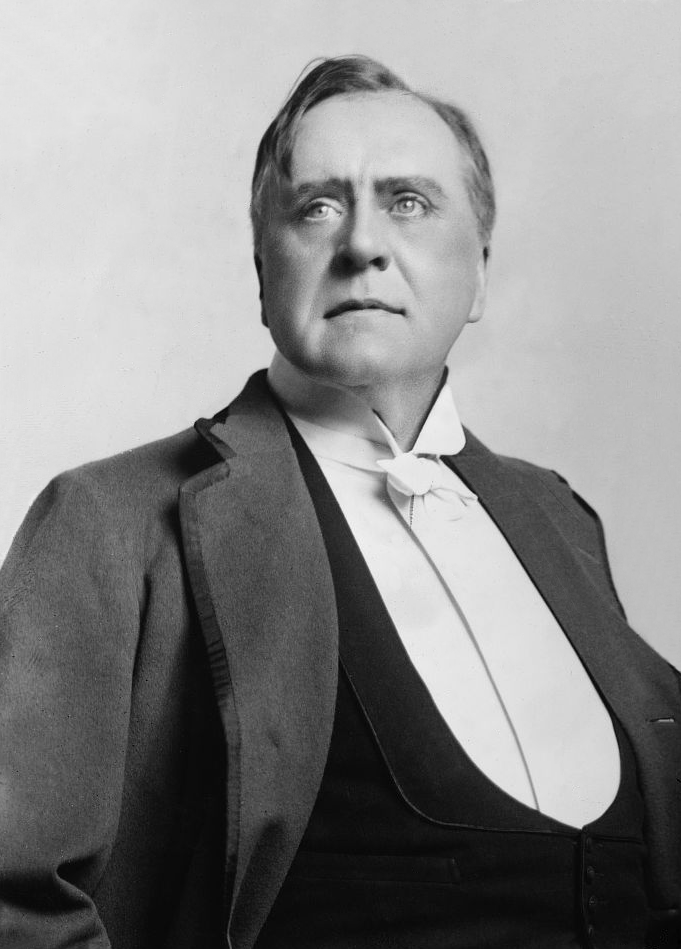
Herbert Beerbohm Tree

Sir Herbert Beerbohm Tree (17 December 1852 – 2 July 1917) was an English actor-manager of the late Victorian and Edwardian eras.

Tree began performing in the 1870s. By 1887, he was managing the Haymarket Theatre in the West End, winning praise for adventurous programming and lavish productions, and starring in many of its productions. In 1899, he helped fund the rebuilding, and became manager, of His Majesty's Theatre. Again, he promoted a mix of Shakespeare and classic plays with new works and adaptations of popular novels, giving them spectacular productions in this large house, and often playing leading roles. His wife, actress Helen Maud Holt, often played opposite him and assisted him with management of the theatres.

Although Tree was regarded as a versatile and skilled actor, particularly in character roles, by his later years his technique was seen as mannered and old-fashioned. He founded the Royal Academy of Dramatic Art in 1904 and was knighted for his contributions to theatre in 1909. His famous family includes his siblings, explorer Julius Beerbohm, author Constance Beerbohm and half-brother caricaturist Max Beerbohm. His daughters were Viola, an actress, Felicity, a socialite and Iris, a poet.

== Early life and career ==
Born in Kensington, London as Herbert Draper Beerbohm, Tree was the second son and second child of Julius Ewald Edward Beerbohm (1810–1892) and his wife Constantia (née Draper) Beerbohm. The senior Beerbohm was of Lithuanian origin; (Note: Although the Beerbohms were supposed by some to be of Jewish descent, on looking into the question in his later years, Max Beerbohm told a biographer, "I should be delighted to know that we Beerbohms have that very admirable and engaging thing, Jewish blood. But there seems to be no reason for supposing that we have. Our family records go back as far as 1668, and there is nothing in them compatible with Judaism".) he had come to the United Kingdom in about 1830 and set up and prospered as a cereal merchant. Draper was an Englishwoman. They had four children. Tree's younger brother was the author and explorer Julius Beerbohm, and his sister was author Constance Beerbohm. A younger half-brother was the parodist and caricaturist Max Beerbohm, born from their father's second marriage. Max jokingly claimed that Herbert added the "Tree" to his name because it was easier for audiences than shouting "Beerbohm! Beerbohm!" at curtain calls. The latter part of his surname, "bohm", is north German dialect for "tree".

Tree's early education included Mrs Adams's Preparatory School at Frant, East Sussex, Dr Stone's school in King's Square, Bristol, and Westbourne Collegiate School in Westbourne Grove, London. After these, he attended the Salzmann Schnepfenthal School in Thuringia, Germany, where his father had been educated. Upon his return to England, he began performing with amateur troupes, eventually using the name Herbert Beerbohm Tree, while working in his father's business.

== Actor ==
In 1878, Tree played Grimaldi in Dion Boucicault's The Life of an Actress at the Globe Theatre; shortly after, he began his professional career. For the next six years, he performed mainly on tour in the British provinces, playing character roles. He made his London debut late in 1878 at the Olympic Theatre under the management of Henry Neville. His first real success was as the elderly Marquis de Pontsablé in Madame Favart, in which he toured towards the end of 1879. Another London engagement was as Prince Maleotti in a revival of Forget-me-Not at the Prince of Wales's Theatre in 1880.

His first London success came in 1884 as the Rev. Robert Spalding in Charles Hawtrey's adaptation of The Private Secretary. Tree embellished the comic elements of the role, which added to the popularity of the play. His next role was Paolo Marcari in Called Back by Hugh Conway. The contrast between this dashing Italian spy and his timid parson in Hawtrey's play, showed his versatility as a character actor. Other appearances over the next two years included roles in revivals of A. W. Pinero's The Magistrate and W. S. Gilbert's Engaged. In 1886, he played Iago in Othello and Sir Peter Teazle in The School for Scandal with F. R. Benson's company at Bournemouth. The same year, in London, he made a success at the Haymarket Theatre, in the character role of Baron Harzfeld in Jim the Penman by Charles Young.

== Theatre manager and leading roles ==
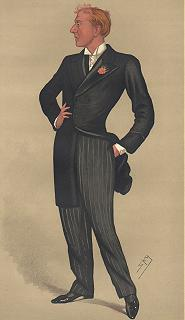
Tree, as depicted in the pages of Vanity Fair (1890)

In 1887, at age thirty-four, Tree took over the management of the Comedy Theatre in the West End of London. His first production was a successful run of the Russian revolutionary play The Red Lamp by W. Outram Tristram, in which Tree took the role of Demetrius.

Later in the year, he became the manager of the prestigious Haymarket Theatre. Since the departure of the Bancrofts in 1885, that theatre's reputation had suffered. Tree restored it during his tenure. He produced and appeared on stage in some thirty plays during the following decade. While popular farces and melodramas like Trilby anchored the repertoire (the production ran for an extraordinary 260 performances), Tree also encouraged the new drama, staging Maeterlinck's The Intruder (1890), Ibsen's An Enemy of the People (1893) and Wilde's A Woman of No Importance (1893), among others. He supported new playwrights by producing special "Monday night" performances of their new plays.

Tree also mounted critically acclaimed productions of Hamlet (1892), Henry IV, Part 1 (1896) and The Merry Wives of Windsor (1889), establishing himself as a Shakespearean leading man. The Times thought his Hamlet a "notable success", but not everyone agreed: W. S. Gilbert said of it, "I never saw anything so funny in my life, and yet it was not in the least vulgar." (Note: The Manchester Guardian (obituary notice) attributed the joke to Tree's half-brother Max Beerbohm. Bernard Shaw believed that Tree had made up the joke himself and fathered it on Gilbert.) His Haymarket seasons were broken by visits to the United States in January 1895 and November 1896, and occasional visits to the provinces.

With the profits he had accumulated at the Haymarket, Tree helped finance the rebuilding of Her Majesty's Theatre in grand Louis XV style. He owned and managed it. He lived in the theatre for two decades following its completion in 1897 until his death in 1917. For his personal use, he had a banqueting hall and living room installed in the massive, central, square French-style dome. The theatre historian W. J. MacQueen-Pope, wrote of the theatre,

Simply to go to His Majesty's was a thrill. As soon as you entered it, you sensed the atmosphere ... In Tree's time it was graced by footmen in powdered wigs and liveries ... Everything was in tone, nothing cheap, nothing vulgar.

Tree opened his theatre in 1897 during Queen Victoria's Diamond Jubilee year, associating the new structure with an imperial celebration.

Over the next two decades, Tree staged approximately sixty plays there, programming a repertory at least as varied as he had at the Haymarket. His first production at Her Majesty's was a dramatisation of Gilbert Parker's The Seats of the Mighty. Tree mounted new plays by prominent British playwrights, such as Carnac Sahib (1899) by Henry Arthur Jones. His productions were exceptionally profitable; they were famous, most of all, for their elaborate and often spectacular scenery and effects. Unlike some other famous actor-managers, Tree engaged the best actors available to join his company and hired the best designers and composers for the plays with incidental music. His productions starred such noted actors as Constance Collier, Ellen Terry, Madge Kendal, Winifred Emery, Julia Neilson, Violet Vanbrugh, Oscar Asche, Arthur Bourchier, and Lewis Waller.

Tree often starred in the theatre's dramatisations of popular nineteenth-century novels, such as Sydney Grundy's adaptation of Dumas's Musketeers (1898); Tolstoy's Resurrection (1903); Dickens's Oliver Twist (1905), The Mystery of Edwin Drood (1908) and David Copperfield (1914); and Morton's dramatisation of Thackeray's The Newcomes, called Colonel Newcome (1906), among others. Tree staged many contemporary verse dramas by Stephen Phillips and others, including Herod (1900), Ulysses (1902), Nero (1906) and Faust (1908). Adaptations of classic foreign plays included Beethoven by Louis Parker, an adaptation of the play by René Fauchois (1909); A Russian Tragedy, an English version by Henry Hamilton of the play by Adolph Glass (1909); and The Perfect Gentleman by W. Somerset Maugham, an adaptation of the classic Molière play, Le bourgeois gentilhomme (1913). The classical repertory included such works as The School for Scandal (1909). Tree also programmed popular melodramas, farces, romantic comedies and premieres, such as Bernard Shaw's Pygmalion, in 1914. Tree played Henry Higgins opposite the Eliza of Mrs Patrick Campbell. The actor John Gielgud wrote, "Rehearsing Pygmalion with Tree she must have been impossible. They were both such eccentrics. They kept ordering each other out of the theatre with Shaw in the middle, trying to cope with them." Tree also took his productions on tour to the United States many times. In 1907 he visited Berlin's Royal Opera House at the invitation of Kaiser Wilhelm II. Gilbert remarked that Tree had been invited by the Kaiser "with the malignant motive of showing the Germans what impostors we all are."

== Shakespeare ==
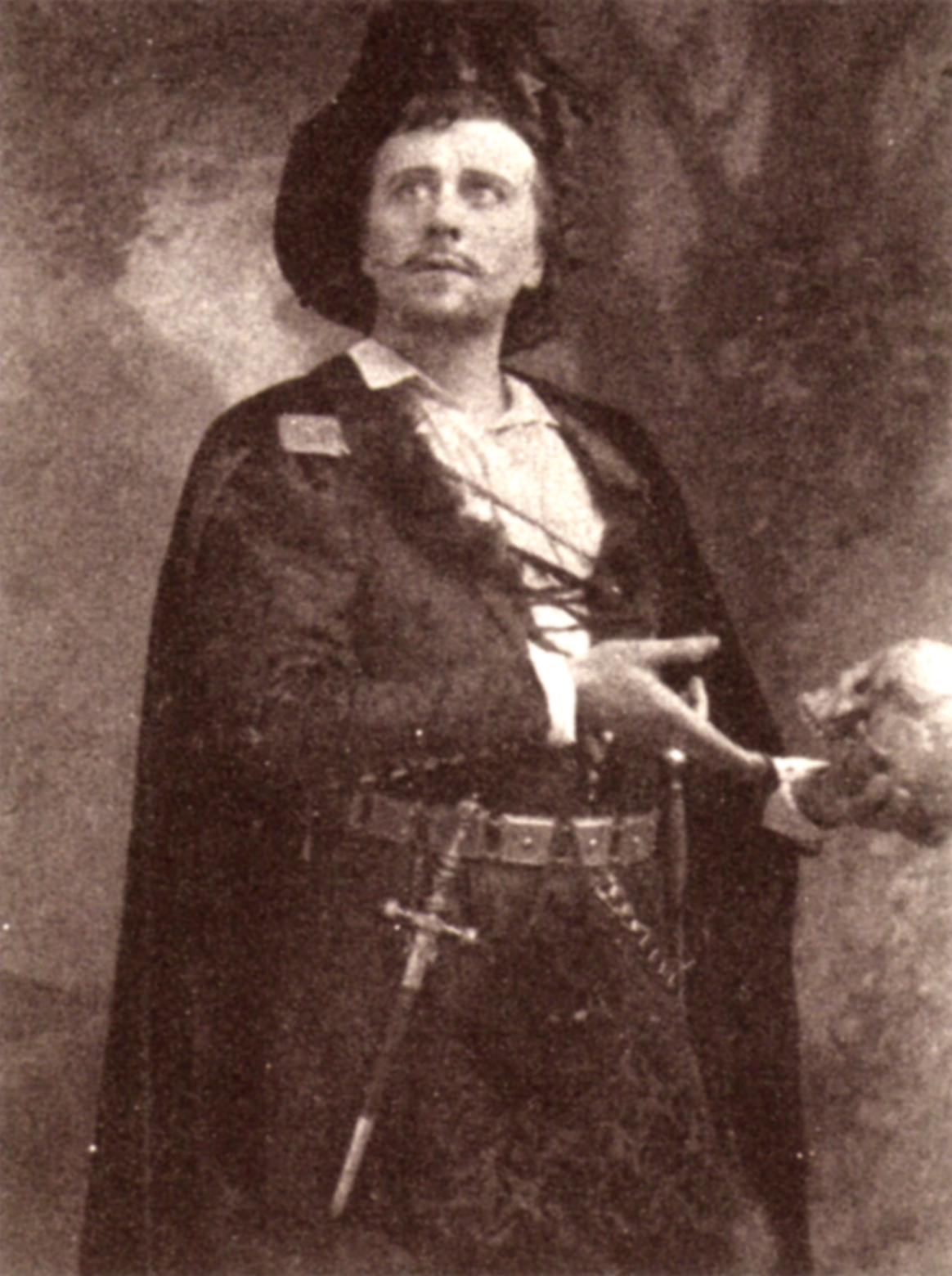
Tree as Hamlet in 1892.

Under Tree, however, Her (later His) Majesty's Theatre was most famous for its work with Shakespeare, building an international reputation as the premier British playhouse for his works during the Edwardian era, which had for so long belonged to Henry Irving at the Lyceum Theatre during the Victorian period. Tree worked untiringly to make Shakespeare popular with the theatregoing public. He mounted sixteen Shakespeare productions, many of which earned enough success to justify revivals during subsequent seasons. He also established an annual Shakespeare festival from 1905 to 1913 that showcased a total of over two hundred performances by his company and other acting troupes. Tree overturned the popular wisdom at the time that Shakespeare productions would lose money, creating stagings that appealed widely to patrons. In fact, the theatre's first Shakespearian play, Julius Caesar, was its first commercial success in 1898, running for 165 consecutive performances and selling 242,000 tickets. The next two years saw two more hits, King John and A Midsummer Night's Dream. Tree's longest-running revival, Henry VIII, ran for a sensational 254 consecutive performances from 1 September 1910 to 8 April 1911. Many of the others were similar hits.

Tree staged the Shakespeare plays, in particular, to appeal to the broad public taste for realistic scenery and scenic effects and lavish spectacle, mirroring the Edwardian fashion for luxury and extravagance. For example, in The Winter's Tale (1906), there was a woodland glade with a shepherd's cottage and babbling brook; in The Tempest (1904), a replica of a sixteenth-century vessel was tossed in a storm; in The Merchant of Venice (1908), he recreated an authentic Renaissance ghetto. Tree expounded his views on staging in 1897:

Everything that tends to aid illusion, to stimulate the imagination of an audience, is legitimate on the stage. Everything that detracts from illusion is illegitimate. We hear a great deal of cant talked by those who insist that the ideal stage setting should be a green baize, whose decoration should consist of placards inscribed, "This is a street," "This is a house," "This is heaven." In all this there seems to me something of affectation. If Shakespeare's poetry could be better or more reverently illustrated by such means, I would say: "Take away those baubles of scenery, of costume, and of archaeological accessories!"

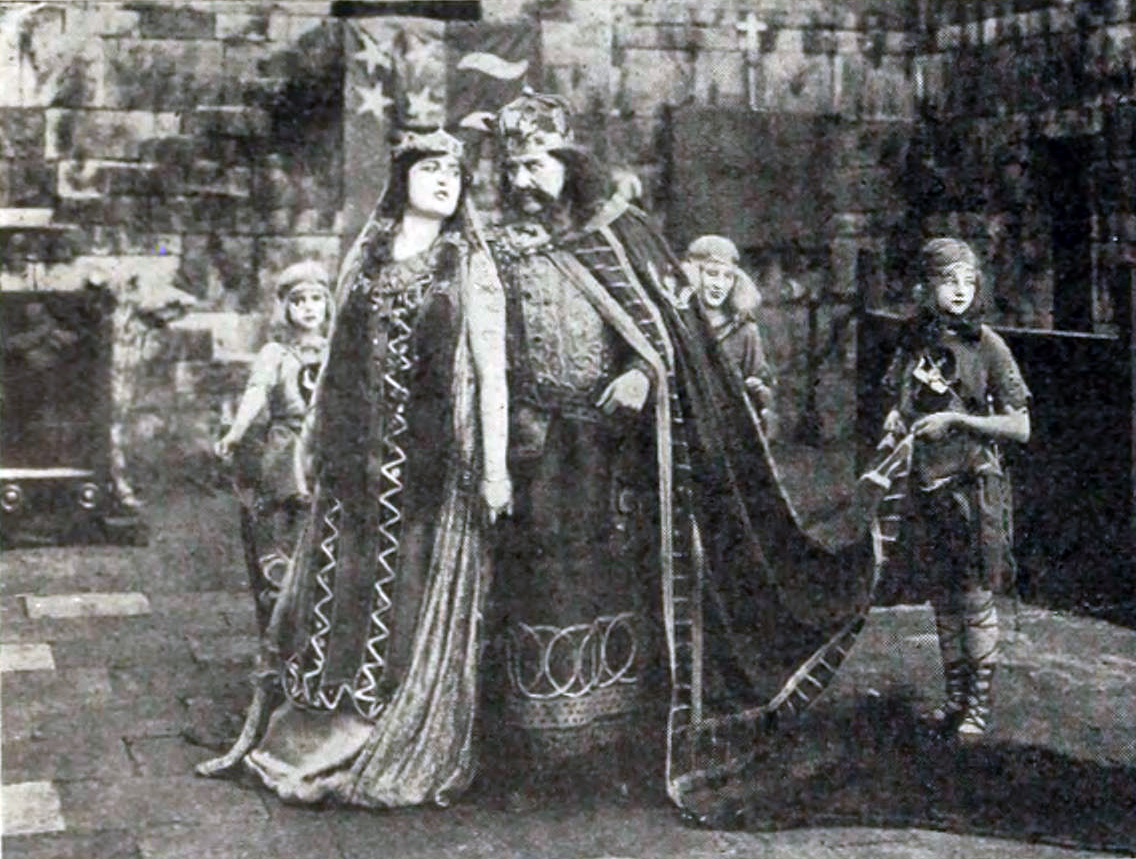
Macbeth (1916)

Tree sometimes interpolated scenes of famous historical events into the plays to provide even more spectacle, such as King John's granting of Magna Carta or Anne Boleyn's coronation in Westminster Abbey.

Tree also pursued four Shakespeare film projects during his career at Her Majesty's. Of great historical interest is the filming, in 1899, of three brief segments from his production of King John, in which he starred and directed. This is the first film record of a Shakespeare play. Charles Urban filmed the opening shipwreck from the 1904 revival of The Tempest at the theatre in 1905; Tree, whose role in the production was Caliban, did not appear in this scene. Tree played Cardinal Wolsey in a 1911 studio film by William Barker of a five-scene version of Henry VIII, based on the theatre's 1910 production. Tree was paid the unprecedented sum of £1,000 lest the film prove unsatisfactory, or damage ticket sales of the theatre presentation. Filming took place at studios in Ealing, west London and took only one day, thanks to careful preparation beforehand. The film was presented to the public on 27 February 1911 in various theatres in London and in the provinces, and was a huge success. The Moving Picture World wrote, "The picture is without doubt the greatest that has even been attempted in this country, and I am almost tempted to say in any other ... the acting passes anything ever seen in moving pictures before.... The effect on the moving picture industry here will be enormous." In California in 1916, Tree played the title role in a film of Macbeth, by D. W. Griffith (considered a lost film).

== Reputation and last years ==
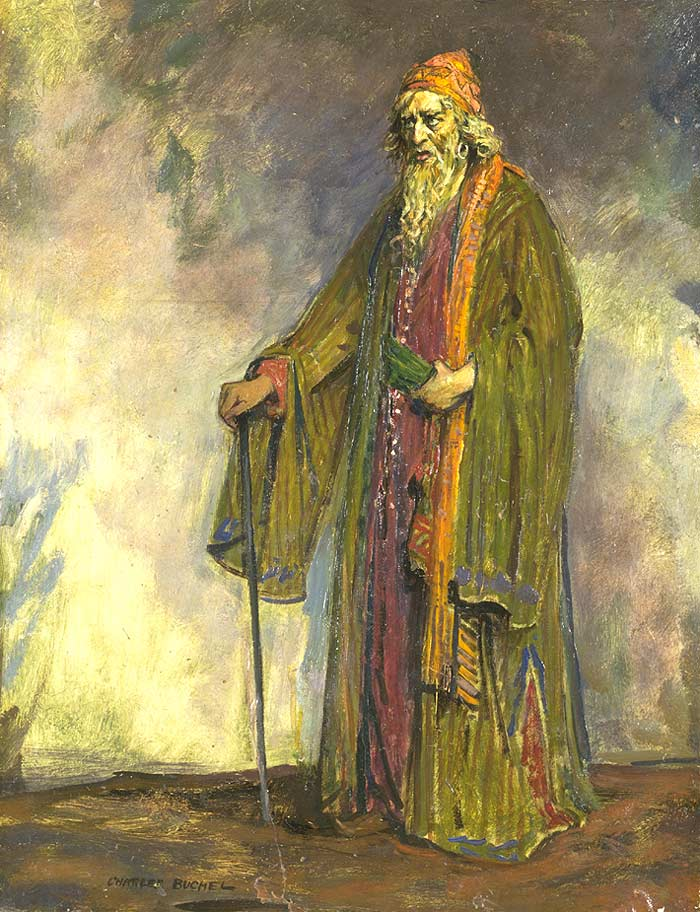
Tree as Shylock, painted by Charles Buchel.

According to Tree's biographers, critics and audiences considered Tree to be the best character actor of his day. He himself detested the term "character actor", saying:

All acting should be character acting. What is Shylock? A character part. What are Macbeth and Richard III but character parts? What are Hamlet, Iago, or Othello but character parts? What are Brutus, Mark Antony and Cassius? Such characters as Romeo of course require the appearance of youth and those graces of person which will alone commend the Mantuan lover to his Juliet. But even here, an audience will be more moved by the intellectual suggestion of a Jean de Reszke, than by the inadequate posturings of a youthful nincompoop.

He was an exceptional mime and demonstrated unrivalled versatility in creating individual characterisations. He was particularly praised for his vivid characters with eccentric and idiosyncratic and habits, including Fagin, Falstaff and Svengali. His diligent preparation and attention to detail in make-up, gesture, body position and facial expression allowed him to inhabit these roles. He used his expressive eyes to project such varied emotions as "the dreamy languor of Hamlet during his moments of reflection and the baleful hatred of Shylock towards his persecutors to the nervous fear of Richard II during his surrender at Flint Castle. His Malvolio was a swaggering and conceited fool, King John a superstitious and deceitful coward, and Macbeth a neurotic and self-torturing monarch." The literary critic Desmond MacCarthy wrote of Tree: "He could make himself look like Falstaff. He understood and revelled in the character of Falstaff, but his performance lacked fundamental force. Hence the contradiction in his acting: his performance as a whole often fell short of high excellence, yet these same impersonations were lit by insight and masterly strokes of interpretation, which made the spectator feel that he was watching the performance of the most imaginative of living actors."

In the great tragic Shakespearean roles, however, Tree was overshadowed by earlier actors such as Henry Irving. During performance, Tree allowed inspiration to suggest to him appropriate stage business, which sometimes lead to inconsistent interpretations in his portrayals of a role. The Manchester Guardian wrote, "The wonderful thing about him was his amazing versatility, and there was an intellectual virility, an untiring earnestness about the man, which was irresistibly stimulating." Tree's versatility, however, was a two edged sword: he quickly tired of characters after a brief run and sought to add business and details to the part to sustain his interest, which led to further character inconsistencies in long runs. Tree's voice was described as thin, and he was sometimes criticised for struggling to project it in a manner that made his performance seem unnatural. In the last decade of his career, Tree's technique was seen as mannered and old fashioned. His spectacles, too, in comparison with the experimental methods of Poel and other producers, seemed outdated, although Tree responded to his critics by noting that his productions remained profitable and well attended.

== Personal life ==
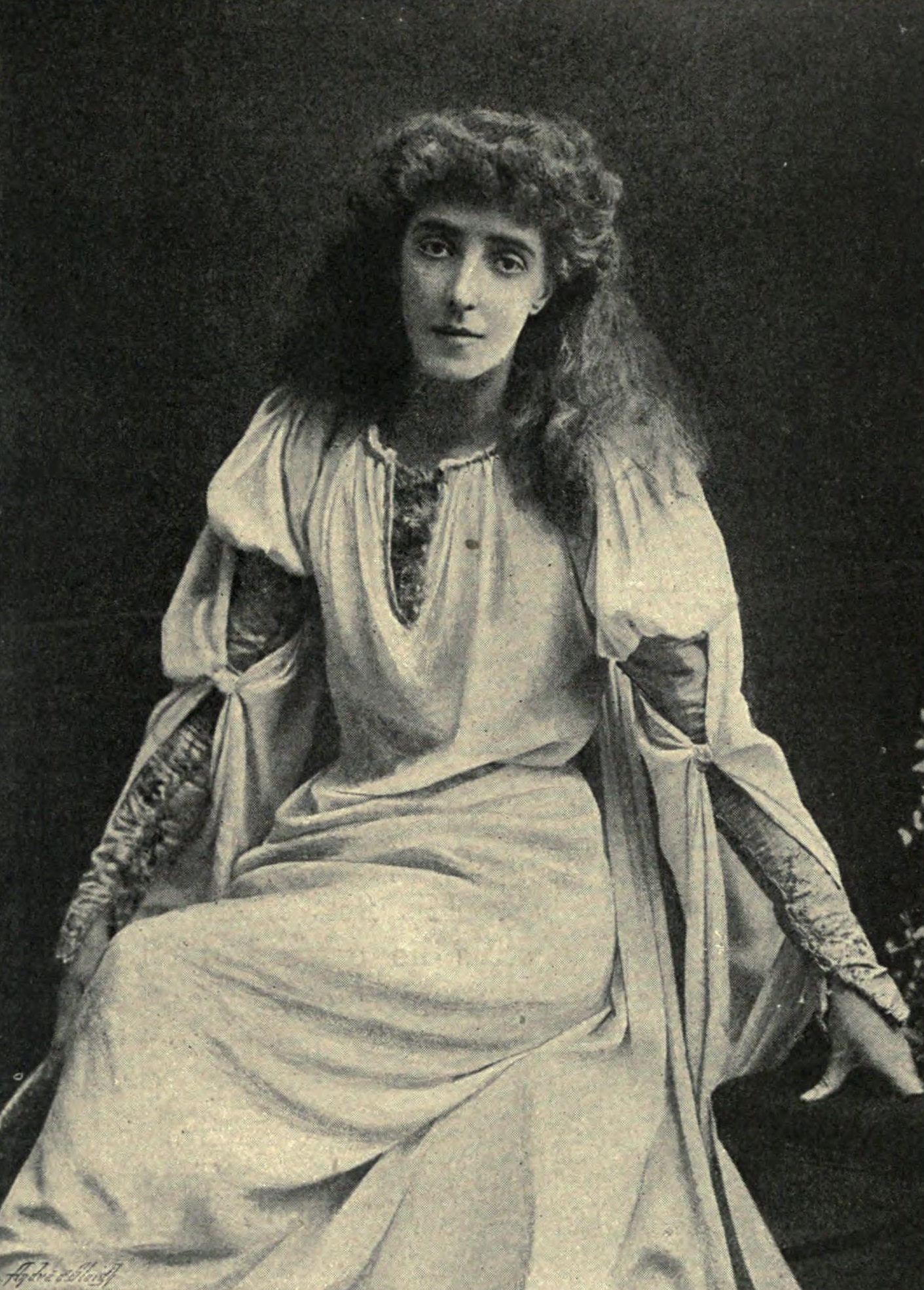
Tree's wife, Helen, as Ophelia in Hamlet

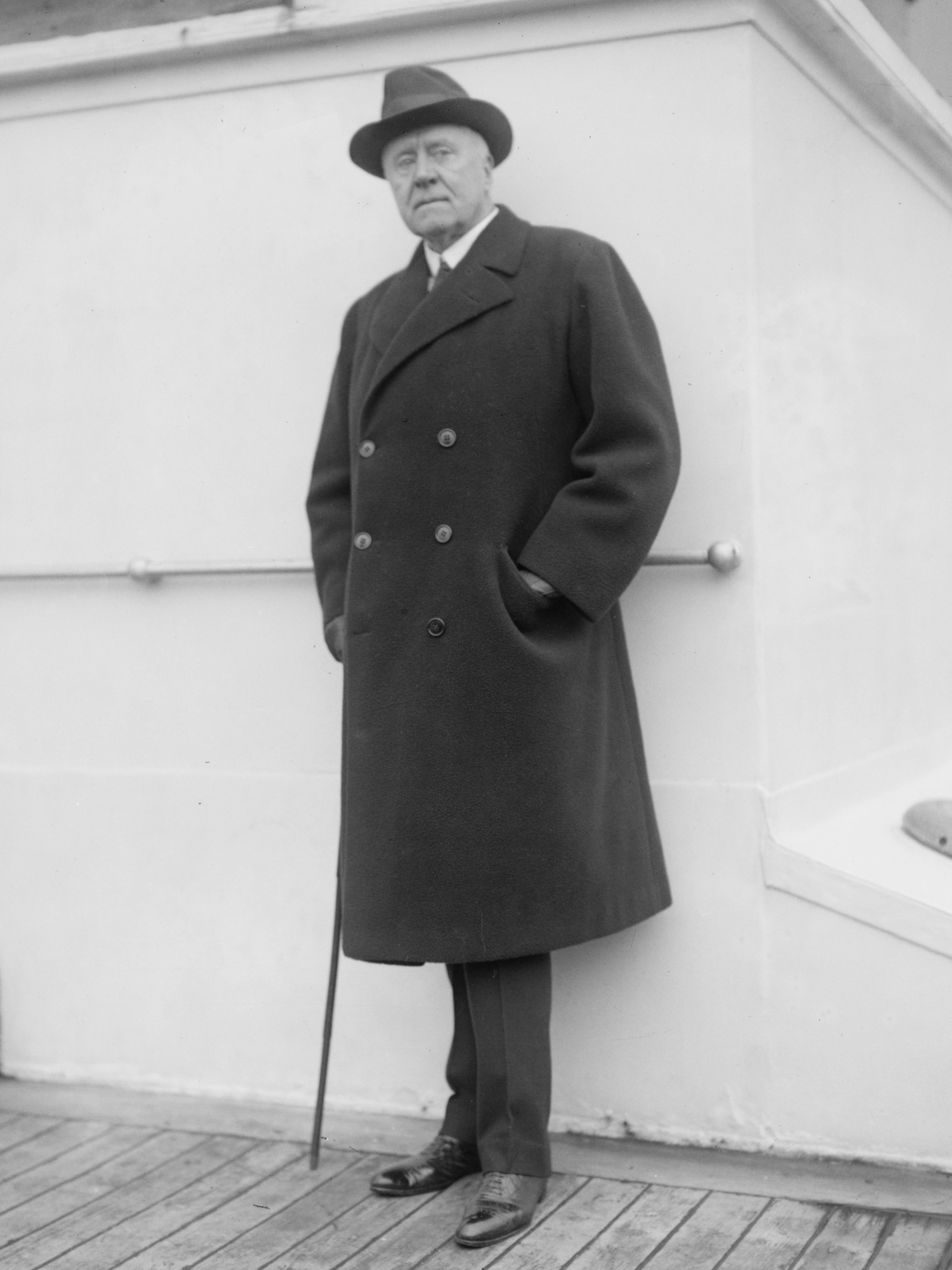
Tree in 1915 aboard a passenger liner

Tree married actress Helen Maud Holt (1863–1937) in 1882; she often played opposite him and assisted him with management of the theatres. Her charm also assisted the couple's entry into prominent social and élite artistic and intellectual circles. Their daughters were actresses Viola Tree (who married drama critic Alan Leonard Romaine Parsons and whose grandson is the musician Alan Parsons), Felicity Tree (who married Sir Geoffrey Cory-Wright, third baronet) and poet Iris Tree (who married Curtis Moffat, becoming Countess Ledebur). Tree also fathered several illegitimate children (six with Beatrice May Pinney), including film director Carol Reed and Peter Reed, father of the British actor Oliver Reed. He was also the grandfather of Hollywood screenwriter and producer Ivan Moffat.

Tree founded the Royal Academy of Dramatic Art (RADA) in 1904. He also served as president of the Theatrical Managers' Association and assisted the Actors' Benevolent Fund and the Actors' Association. For his contributions to theatre, he was knighted in 1909. During World War I, Tree contributed his celebrity by delivering patriotic addresses. He wrote several books discussing the importance of the theatre and the arts in modern society.

Tree's last professional undertaking was a visit to Los Angeles in 1915 fulfilling a contract with a film company. He was in America for the greater part of 1915 and 1916. He returned to England in 1917 and died, aged 64, from pulmonary blood clots. According to writer Vera Brittain, he died suddenly in the arms of her friend, the novelist Winifred Holtby, then aged 19 and working as a nursing assistant at a fashionable London nursing home where Tree was recuperating from surgery to repair a broken leg. His remains were cremated, and his ashes are buried at the additional burial ground of St John-at-Hampstead church.

== Discography ==
Tree recorded five 10" records for the Gramophone Company (afterwards His Master's Voice, couplings as E numbers) in 1906.

- 1312 Hamlet's Soliloquy on Death: "To be, or not to be" – Hamlet (Shakespeare) (3554/E162). (See external link)
- 1313 Svengali mesmerises Trilby: "The roof of your mouth is like the dome of the Pantheon" – Trilby (Paul M. Potter, after G. du Maurier) (3751/E162).
- 1314 Mark Antony's lament over the body of Julius Caesar: "Oh pardon me, thou bleeding piece of earth" – Julius Caesar (Shakespeare) (3557/E161).
- 1315 Richard II's Soliloquy on the death of kings: "No matter where – of comfort no man speak" – Richard II (Shakespeare) (3556/E163).
- 1316 Falstaff's speech on Honour: "Hal, if thou see me down in battle / 'Tis not due yet..." – Henry IV, Part 1 (Shakespeare) (3555/E161).

== In popular culture ==
The songwriter Maude Valérie White dedicated her setting of Byron's song "So we'll go no more a-roving" to Tree, "in grateful remembrance of 13 July 1888". In the musical Cats, Jellylorum says of Gus, "He has acted with Irving, he's acted with Tree." In the Frasier episode "Daphne's Room", the plot involves Frasier's retrieval of a book from Daphne’s room called The Life and Times of Sir Herbert Beerbohm Tree.

== See also ==
- Beerbohm family

== Notes, references and sources ==
=== Sources ===
- Gielgud, John. An Actor and His Time, Sidgwick and Jackson, London (1979), ISBN 0-283-98573-9
- Macqueen-Pope, W. Carriages at eleven: the story of the Edwardian theatre (1947) Carriages at Eleven
- Pearson, Hesketh. Gilbert and Sullivan, Penguin Books, Harmondsworth (1950)
- Chisholm, Hugh, ed. (1911). "Tree, Sir Herbert Beerbohm" . Encyclopædia Britannica. Vol. 27 (11th ed.). Cambridge University Press. p. 234.
- Chisholm, Hugh, ed. (1922). "Tree, Sir Herbert Beerbohm" . Encyclopædia Britannica. Vol. 32 (12th ed.). London & New York: The Encyclopædia Britannica Company. p. 772.
