= Constance Beerbohm =

British writer (1856–1939)

Constance Mary Beerbohm (1856–8 January 1939) was the oldest daughter of Julius Ewald Edward Beerbohm (1811–92), of Dutch, Lithuanian, and German origin, who had come to England in about 1830 and set up as a prosperous corn merchant. He married an Englishwoman, Constantia Draper; and the couple had four children. Constance Beerbohm's brother was the renowned actor-manager Herbert Beerbohm Tree; another brother was the engineer, author and explorer Julius Beerbohm; a younger half-brother was the caricaturist and parodist Max Beerbohm.

Constance was the only female member of Julius Beerbohm's first family. She was described as plain, unselfish and very tender-hearted. Eliza Beerbohm, who was her stepmother as well as her aunt, made it quite clear that she preferred her own daughters; and, to Constance's dismay when she had grown up, she had to leave the family home and set up on her own. One afternoon, she called on her family, hiding a parcel containing her belongings in the bushes in the drive. Staying until nearly supper-time, her stepmother said, "You had better stay to supper". After supper, Constance lingered until nearly bedtime: "You had better stay the night", said her stepmother. Constance fetched her parcel from the bushes and stayed for the rest of her life, taking on the practical management of the household and helping to bring up her five younger half-siblings, including Max Beerbohm.

Constance added to the family's income by writing comedies for amateur acting societies and articles for the humbler kind of women's journals on subjects like cooking, of which she knew little, and on the Royal Family, about which she knew even less. As a writer Beerbohm contributed articles to Strand Magazine, The Woman at Home, and Cassell's Magazine among others. Her book, A Little Book of Plays for Professional and Amateur Actors, was published in 1897.

As a member of the famous Beerbohm family of actors and writers, she corresponded with many of the eminent men of her day, including Clement Scott and William Rothenstein.

== Publications ==
- Beerbohm, Constance A Little Book of Plays for Professional and Amateur Actors, George Newnes (London) (1897)

== See also ==
- Beerbohm family
