= Hubert Conway Rees =

British army officer (1882–1948)

Brigadier-General Hubert Conway Rees CMG DSO
- Born: 26 March 1882; Conway, Wales
- Died: 3 January 1948 (aged 66); Tenbury Wells, England
- Military career
- Allegiance: United Kingdom
- Branch: British Army
- Service years: 1900–1922
- Rank: Brigadier-General (honorary rank); Lieutenant-Colonel (substantive rank)
- Commands: 2nd Battalion, Welsh Regiment (1914–1915); 94th Infantry Brigade (1916); 11th Infantry Brigade (1916); 13th Reserve Brigade (1917); 149th (Northumberland) Brigade (1917); 150th (York and Durham) Brigade (1918); 6th battalion, Welch Regiment (1919)
- Conflicts: Second Boer War; First World War
- Awards: Companion of the Order of St Michael and St George; Distinguished Service Order

Hubert Conway Rees (26 March 1882 – 3 January 1948) was a British Army officer. The only son of a Church of England clergyman, Rees was born in Conway, Carnarvonshire. After an education at Charterhouse School in Surrey, Rees joined the 3rd (Militia) Battalion of the East Surrey Regiment in 1900 and served in the Second Boer War. In 1903 he transferred to the regular army, joining the Welsh Regiment as a second lieutenant. By the start of the First World War in 1914 he had risen in rank to captain. Rees served with the regiment's 2nd Battalion during the Retreat from Mons and the First Battle of the Aisne and was awarded the Distinguished Service Order for his actions in assisting a neighbouring battalion during the First Battle of Ypres. Rees was one of the few survivors of his battalion after a 31 October action at Gheluvelt Chateau and assumed command of the unit until January 1915. He afterwards served in Britain at the Royal Military College, Sandhurst and as a divisional staff officer.

Rees was appointed to command the 94th Infantry Brigade on 15 June 1916 and led them in action weeks later on the first day on the Somme. He has been praised for recalling two of his battalions after the initial wave failed to make progress. Later that year Rees commanded the 11th Infantry Brigade and 13th Reserve Brigade. In 1917 he led the 149th (Northumberland) Brigade in the Battle of Arras. In early 1918 Rees took command of the 150th (York and Durham) Brigade. He led them in a defence against the German spring offensive but the brigade was over-run during the Third Battle of the Aisne and Rees was captured. Shortly afterwards he was interviewed by the German Kaiser, Wilhelm II. Rees remained a prisoner for the rest of the war. On his return to Britain he was appointed a Companion of the Order of St Michael and St George. Rees went on to command the 6th battalion of his regiment and serve as a general staff officer before retiring in 1922.

== Early life and career ==
Hubert Conway Rees was born on 26 March 1882 at the vicarage in Conway, Wales. He was the only son of Henry Rees, the honorary canon and precentor of the Church of England's Bangor Cathedral, and his wife Harriet Rees. Rees was educated at Charterhouse School, Surrey, before joining the 3rd (Militia) Battalion of the East Surrey Regiment in December 1900. As he was 6 feet 4 inches (1.93 m) in height he was known to his comrades as "Long 'un" (long one). Rees served in the Second Boer War in the Cape and Orange River provinces between July 1901 and May 1902 and was awarded the Queen's South Africa Medal with four clasps for his service.

Rees became a lieutenant in his militia battalion but transferred to the regular army on 28 January 1903, taking a lower ranking commission as a second lieutenant in the Welsh Regiment on 28 January 1903. He was promoted to lieutenant on 9 September 1906 and to captain on 12 June 1912. In 1914 Rees married Katharine Adelaide Loring with whom he had one daughter, Mary Katherine.

== First World War ==
Rees was serving with the 2nd Battalion of the Welsh Regiment by 12 August 1914, when it was sent to France shortly after the outbreak of the First World War. Rees and the unit fought in the Retreat from Mons and in the Chivy Valley during the First Battle of the Aisne. The battalion fought off several German assaults at Langemarck during the First Battle of Ypres on 21 October 1914. During this action Rees led a company of his battalion, under heavy fire, to support a unit of the South Wales Borderers which had come under German attack. Rees was awarded the Distinguished Service Order on 9 November for his actions in this engagement.

On 31 October Rees and 600 men of his battalion were at the Gheluvelt Chateau when they came under sustained German attack. Although the attacks were repelled some 95% of the 1,200 men on the British side in that action were killed or wounded. Rees witnessed the death of the battalion commander, Lieutenant-Colonel C. B. Morland, brother of General Sir Thomas Morland, in a shell explosion. Rees later reported that a bullet had struck his rifle stock and another cut the strap of his water bottle. By the end of the day Rees' battalion had been reduced by casualties to just two officers (including Rees) and 25 other ranks. Despite having been the second-most junior captain in the battalion Rees assumed command of the unit, as well as the remnants of the 1st Battalion, Queen's Royal Regiment (West Surrey). Rees retained command of his battalion until 19 January 1915. On 1 December he was granted the temporary rank of major, whilst in this role.

When a new commander was posted Rees requested a transfer to Britain, considering that his position under the new officer would be difficult as he was closely acquainted with the men and had built the unit up almost from nothing after the action at Gheluvelt Chateau. Rees was appointed to the brevet rank of major on 18 February 1915 in recognition of his service in the field and on 15 March he was seconded to the Royal Military College, Sandhurst. In April Rees was appointed as a staff officer to the 43rd (Wessex) Division and then, on 21 April, the 38th (Welsh) Division.

=== Brigadier-general ===
On 15 June 1916 Rees was appointed to the temporary rank of brigadier general and became general officer commanding (GOC) of the 94th Infantry Brigade after its commander, George Carter-Campbell had fallen ill. Rees commanded the brigade, a Kitchener's Army unit made up from pals battalions, in its attack on Serre-lès-Puisieux on 1 July 1916, the first day on the Somme. The brigade suffered heavy casualties; Rees saved lives by taking the decision to recall the 1st and 2nd Barnsley Pals (the 13th and 14th battalions of the York and Lancaster Regiment) from a stalled assault. The battalions had made their attacks in support of the first wave of Accrington Pals and the Sheffield City Battalion who had suffered heavy losses. Rees noted in his memoirs that "I have never seen a finer display of individual and collective bravery than the advance of that brigade ... I knew that no troops could hope to get through such a fire".

Rees was appointed to command the 11th Infantry Brigade on 4 July 1916, its commander Charles Bertie Prowse had died of wounds on the first day on the Somme. Rees was promoted to the brevet rank of lieutenant-colonel on 1 January 1917, for his service in the field, and afterwards commanded the 13th Reserve Brigade on the Home Front. In March he was appointed to command the 149th (Northumberland) Brigade and served with them in the April–May Battle of Arras. Rees fell ill and was hospitalised in July and his appointment as commander of the 149th ended in September.

From 27 February 1918 Rees commanded the 150th (York and Durham) Brigade. The unit fought defensive actions against the German Operation Michael in March and Operation Georgette in April, but suffered heavy casualties and was redeployed to Chemin des Dames, considered a quiet part of the line, to recover. The German Blücher-Yorck offensive hit this sector of the Aisne, the same area in which Rees had fought in 1914. Seeing that the German advance could not be halted Rees decided on a withdrawal from a position known as the Plateau de Californie (near Craonne) to PC Terasse (south of Craonnelle). Upon arriving at his headquarters Rees found that the 1/4th Battalion, Yorkshire Regiment (Green Howards), had been overrun and German troops were already approaching PC Terrasse. The headquarters had to be dispersed because of shelling and Rees was captured when he became too exhausted to continue to retreat towards the Aisne.

In German captivity Rees was brought to meet German Kaiser Wilhelm II on the Plateau de Californie. Wilhelm restricted his questions to Rees to those of a personal nature rather than military matters. Wilhelm stated that he thought Britain and Germany should be friends and noted his appreciation for the fighting abilities of British troops. Rees, who was photographed with Wilhelm during the meeting, stated he was "furious" about it and had felt "humiliated". Rees remained in German captivity until after the armistice of 11 November 1918 and returned to Britain in December.

== Later life and death ==
In the 1919 New Year Honours Rees was appointed a Companion of the Order of St Michael and St George. In his substantive rank of major he commanded the 6th Battalion of the Welsh Regiment from 3 April to 7 July 1919. Rees was appointed a 2nd grade general staff officer on 11 February 1921. He retired on 22 February 1922, being granted the substantive rank of lieutenant-colonel and the honorary rank of brigadier-general. Rees died on 3 January 1948 at Kyrewood House, Tenbury Wells, Worcestershire.
