= 94th Infantry Brigade (United Kingdom) =

94th Brigade 94th (Yeomanry) Brigade
- Active: 19 November 1914–10 April 1915; 27 April 1915–17 February 1918; 30 May 1918–20 May 1919
- Allegiance: United Kingdom
- Branch: New Army
- Type: Infantry
- Size: Brigade
- Part of: 31st Division
- Engagements: Battle of the Somme; Battle of Arras; Capture of Oppy Wood; Hundred Days Offensive

The 94th Brigade was an infantry formation of the British Army during World War I. It was raised as part of 'Kitchener's Army' and was assigned to the 31st Division. After the original formation was converted into a reserve brigade, the number was transferred to a brigade of 'Pals battalions' from Northern England. It was sent to Egypt at the end of 1915 but was recalled to France shortly afterwards and then served on the Western Front for the rest of the war. The brigade was shattered on the First day on the Somme, but later saw action at Arras and distinguished itself at the Capture of Oppy Wood. It was temporarily disbanded in early 1918 but was reconstituted from dismounted Yeomanry regiments in time to take part in the final battles of the war.

== Original 94th Brigade ==
Alfred Leete's recruitment poster for Kitchener's Army.

On 6 August 1914, less than 48 hours after Britain's declaration of war, Parliament sanctioned an increase of 500,000 men for the Regular British Army. The newly-appointed Secretary of State for War, Earl Kitchener of Khartoum, issued his famous call to arms: 'Your King and Country Need You', urging the first 100,000 volunteers to come forward. This group of six divisions with supporting arms became known as Kitchener's First New Army, or 'K1'. The K2 and K3 battalions, brigades and divisions followed soon afterwards. So far, the battalions had all been formed at the depots of their parent regiments, but recruits had also been flooding in to the Special Reserve (SR) battalions (the former Militia). These were deployed at their war stations in coastal defence where they were training and equipping reservists to provide reinforcement drafts to the Regular Army fighting overseas. The SR battalions were soon well above their establishment strength and on 8 October 1914 the War Office (WO) ordered each SR battalion to use the surplus to form a service battalion of the 4th New Army ('K4'). In November K4 battalions were organised into 18 brigades numbered from 89 to 106 and formed into the 30th–35th Divisions.

Accordingly the battalions of the Special Reserve Brigade in the Harwich Garrison each split off two recruit companies to form the nucleus of the new service battalions, and on 5 November these became 94th Brigade in 31st Division:

- 10th (Service) Battalion, Norfolk Regiment
- 10th (Service) Battalion, Suffolk Regiment
- 9th (Service) Battalion, Bedfordshire Regiment
- 12th (Service) Battalion, Essex Regiment – to 106th Bde, 35th Division, 28 November 1914
- 11th (Service) Battalion, Loyal North Lancashire Regiment – replaced 12th Essex 28 November 1914

On 28 November Brigadier-General J.R.M. Dalrymple-Hay was appointed to command the brigade. Initially the men of 94th Bde had to drill and provide working parties for the coast defences in old red coats with dummy rifles until uniforms and equipment arrived. In early 1915 an outbreak of Cerebrospinal meningitis in the brigade caused the battalions to be scattered, the Suffolks to their regimental depot at Bury St Edmunds, the Bedfords to Mill Hill in Middlesex and the Loyals to White City, London. Training for active service was held up for all the K4 units by the lack of equipment and instructors, and by April 1915 their training was still at an elementary stage. On 10 April 1915 the WO decided to convert the K4 battalions into reserve units, to provide drafts for the K1–K3 battalions in the same way that the SR was doing for the Regular battalions. The K4 divisions were broken up and the brigades were renumbered: 94th Brigade became 6th Reserve Brigade, which re-assembled at Colchester in May 1915.

== New 94th Brigade ==
The first pattern of formation sign worn by 31st Division until 1917.

Meanwhile, the K5 units had been forming since late 1914. These were largely raised by local initiative rather than at regimental depots, and were known as 'Pals battalions'. The first six K5 divisions (37–42) and their constituent brigades were given the numbers of the disbanded K4 formations on 27 April 1915. Thus 115th Brigade of 38th Division became the new 94th Brigade in 31st Division. This brigade, formed on 10 December 1914, consisted of battalions raised in Northern England:

- 10th (Service) Battalion, Lincolnshire Regiment (Grimsby) – raised by the Mayor and Town of Grimsby on 9 September 1914; did not transfer to 94th Bde
- 11th (Service) Battalion, East Lancaster Regiment (Accrington) – raised by the Mayor and Town of Accrington & District on 7 September 1914; transferred to 94th Bde from 'old' 112th Bde
- 12th (Service) Battalion, York and Lancaster Regiment (Sheffield) – raised by the Lord Mayor and City of Sheffield on 5 September 1914
- 13th (Service) Battalion, York and Lancaster Regiment (1st Barnsley) – raised by the Mayor and Town of Barnsley on 17 September 1914
- 14th (Service) Battalion, York and Lancaster Regiment (2nd Barnsley) – raised by the Mayor and Town of Barnsley on 30 November 1914

The battalions underwent their initial training close to their homes – the Sheffield City Battalion at Bramall Lane cricket and football ground and in Norfolk Park, and the 1st Barnsley Pals at Queen's Ground. In December the battalions went into hutted camps outside their towns, the Sheffield City at Redmires Camp and the two Barnsley battalions at New Hall, Silkstone. After the brigades were renumbered, the new 94th Bde concentrated in May at Penkridge Camp on Cannock Chase, Staffordshire, where it was joined by the Accrington Pals in place of the Grimsby Chums. The 31st Division concentrated at South Camp, Ripon, in July 1915, then in September it moved to Hurdcott Camp where it carried out final intensive battle training in the Salisbury Plain Training Area.

=== Egypt ===
On 29 November 1915 the division received warning orders to join the British Expeditionary Force (BEF) in France, and advance parties set out for the embarkation ports of Folkestone and Southampton. At the last minute, the destination was changed to Egypt, the advance parties were recalled, and on 7 December the troops embarked at Devonport. The division reached Port Said between 24 December and 23 January 1916 and went into the Suez Canal defences at Qantara. On 26 February orders arrived to reverse the process and on 1 March the division began re-embarking at Port Said. It unloaded at Marseille between 6 and 16 March and then concentrated in the Somme area as part of the BEF. It remained on the Western Front for the rest of the war.

Soon after its arrival in France 94th Brigade was joined by its support troops:

- 94th Trench Mortar Battery (TMB) – formed as 93/1 and 93/2 TMBs by 12 April, and combined into a single battery by 14 June
- 94th Brigade Machine Gun (MG) Company – formed at Grantham, disembarked at Le Havre on 17 May and joined on 21 May

=== First day of the Somme ===
31st Division was part of the concentration of troops in the Somme sector preparing for that summer's 'Big Push', the Battle of the Somme. Despite all the preparation and high hopes, the First day on the Somme (1 July) was a disaster for 31st Division. Its task was to take the village of Serre and form a defensive flank for the rest of Fourth Army. 94th Brigade attacked on a two-battalion front with the 11th East Lancs and 12th Y&L leading, followed by a company of the divisional pioneer battalion, the 12th King's Own Yorkshire Light Infantry. The troops left their trenches at 07.20, 10 minutes before Zero, when the nearby Hawthorn Ridge mine was exploded and the final intense bombardment of the German positions began. 94th Trench Mortar Battery fired 1150 rounds during the 10 minutes. Thus alerted, the enemy put down a heavy artillery barrage on the British line and their machine gun teams came out of their dugouts. When the leading waves set off across No man's land at 07.30, they were almost annihilated by German fire: 94th Bde (particularly the 12th Y&L) was hit in its left flank from German trenches that were not being attacked, and which had not been adequately screened by a planned smokescreen. Nevertheless the right hand company of the 11th East Lancs succeeded in getting into the German frontline trench. Observation posts reported about 08.30 that this company had emerged from a trench and disappeared into Serre; some men of 12th Y&L may also have reached the village. If this was the case nothing was ever heard from them again, but later in the war bodies of men from the 12th Y&L were recovered from this area. The 14th Y&L were to advance behind the 12th Y&L, establishing a trench line to join the captured German trenches with their own jumping off trenches. They too suffered heavy casualties in No man's land. The leading companies of the 13th Y&L were also badly mauled in trying to reach the 11th East Lancs in the German trenches. With heavy shellfire falling on the chaotic jumping-off trenches, the attack was suspended. By noon the sector was quiet apart from occasional shelling and sniping at the men pinned down in No man's land. Although a fresh attack was ordered for the afternoon, the divisional commander and the commanders of 93rd and 94th Bdes (Brig-Gen H.C. Rees temporarily commanding 94th Bde in the absence of Brig-Gen Carter-Campbell) concluded that neither brigade was fit for any further offensive operation. 94th Brigades's losses had been 705 killed, 848 wounded, 39 missing and 7 prisoners, of which the Accrington Pals lost 585 and the Sheffield City Battalion 512, with another 75 only slightly wounded. Those men in No man's land who could slipped back after dark; for a time next day, the Germans allowed stretcher-bearers to remove casualties from No man's land.

=== Ancre ===
The shattered division was then pulled out and sent to the quiet Neuve-Chapelle sector for rest and refit. Some battalions were temporarily amalgamated until reinforcement drafts arrived. The Somme Offensive was still continuing at the end of October when 31st Division returned to the sector for the Battle of the Ancre, which was to be the last big operation of the year. The division made another attempt to capture Serre on 13 November, but 94th Bde was still not fit for active operations and although standing by it was not employed except to provide carrying parties and to rescue the wounded. The battalions continued to hold the trenches in front of Serre during the winter, carrying out occasional trench raids.

In late February 1917 the Germans began a withdrawal to the Hindenburg Line (Operation Alberich). They disappeared from the Ancre Front on 24 February and 31st Division was ordered to send out strong patrols next day to regain touch with them. On 26 February the division made the biggest advance in the sector, 94th Bde passing through Serre, and over following days it advanced, skirmishing with German rearguards and dealing with booby-traps. This continued until the 31st Division was squeezed out between 9 and 12 March as British units converged on the shorter Hindenburg Line.

Oppy Wood, 1917. Evening by John Nash.

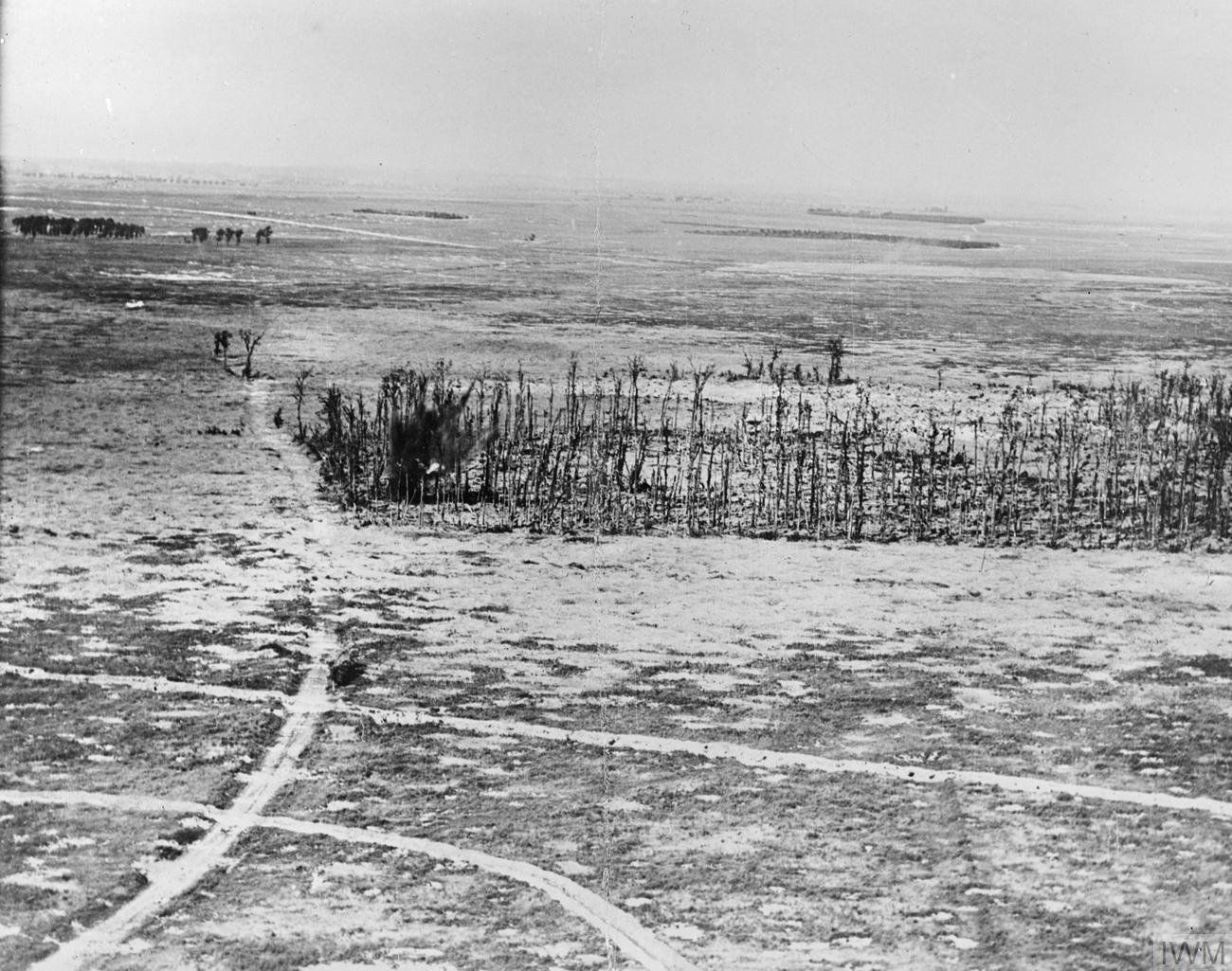
Oppy Wood from the air

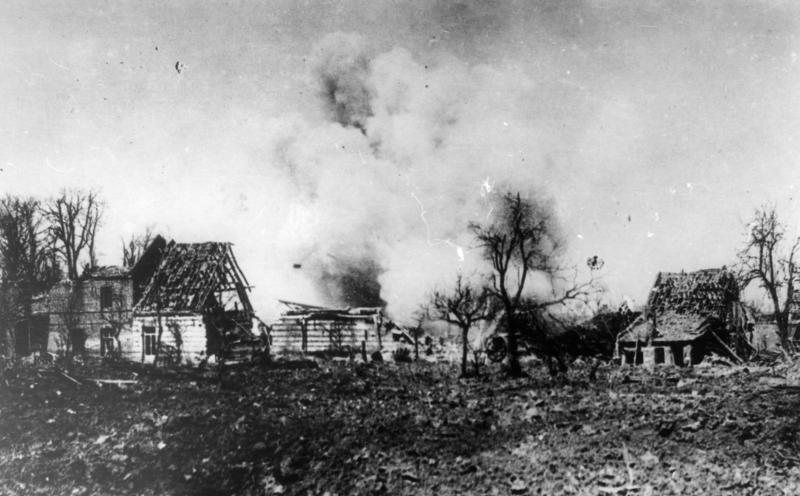
Oppy under shellfire, May 1917.

=== Oppy Wood ===
On 8 April 1917, the division left the Ancre and moved to the Arras sector for the Arras Offensive. On 9 April First Army captured Vimy Ridge, and next day 31st Division moved up in case it was required for exploitation as the offensive developed. However it was not brought into the line until 1 May. The division then attacked on 3 May (the Third Battle of the Scarpe) with 92nd and 93rd Bdes in line. 94th Brigade was not involved, though 12th Y&L was detached in support of 93rd Bde. The assault was launched under a setting moon, and the three leading battalions of 93rd Bde made good progress towards Oppy Wood. 92nd Brigade's attack, however, failed, leaving 93rd Bde's flank exposed. Its three battalions were driven back and 12th Y&L was brought forward amidst alarming reports of enemy counter-attacks, though it was not engaged. Over the following weeks 94th Bde's units defended the key position of Gavrelle Windmill under heavy artillery fire. At first its positions were in shellholes, but these were gradually linked by trenches. The rear trenches were almost obliterated by the enemy artillery, and the defenders were frequently attacked by German aircraft. The task of getting supplies, particularly water, to the front line involved a great deal of dangerous work. The Arras Offensive ended on 17 May, but the tasks of trench holding and repair continued.

Late in June First Army began a series of feint attacks to draw attention away from the Ypres Salient where the BEF was planning a new offensive. First Army gave the impression of preparing for large-scale attacks on Hill 70 and Oppy. In fact the attack on Oppy and Gavrelle, carried out by 94th Bde and 15th Bde of 5th Division on 28 June was in the nature of a carefully-planned large-scale raid, though with the intention of retaining the limited objectives set for it. As a feint it was important that the enemy should be expecting the attack, and they bombarded the packed jumping-off trenches at 17.30. Despite the 200 casualties they had suffered, the two brigades waited until the British barrage came down suddenly at Zero (19.10) then advanced so quickly across No man's land that the German defensive barrage fell behind them. The British covering artillery was so powerful that the assaulting troops met little resistance, taking Gavrelle Mill and Oppy Wood with very few casualties. The Capture of Oppy Wood was a major success, carried out for minimal casualties and giving good observation over the German positions to the north and east.

Afterwards, 31st Division went to rest north of Arras, behind Vimy Ridge. Manpower shortages were now becoming apparent, and some battalions had to be reorganised from four to only three fighting companies. When Canadian Corps moved away, XIII Corps took over defence of the ridge, and 31st Division spent the rest of 1917 defending this sector, constantly working to improve the defences and carrying out raids. Its units suffered serious casualties from German Mustard gas bombardments. 31st Division was not committed to the Third Ypres Offensive, which culminated in the dreadful Battle of Passchendaele, possibly because it was not considered to have recovered from its ordeal on the Somme a year before. In December the division was under orders to move to join the Battle of Cambrai, but the fighting there died down and the order was cancelled.

=== Reorganisation ===
By the end of 1917 the BEF was suffering a severe manpower crisis. In February 1918 all brigades were reorganised on a three-battalion basis, with the surplus men being drafted to bring other units up to strength. 31st Division underwent a major reorganisation, which resulted in 94th Bde being disbanded on 17 February and replaced by 4th Guards Brigade:

- 11th East Lancs (Accrington) – transferred to 92nd Bde 11 February 1918
- 12th Y&L (Sheffield) – disbanded 17 February 1918 (15 officers and 300 other ranks to 13th Y&L)
- 13th Y&L (1st Barnsley) – transferred to 93rd Bde
- 14th Y&L (2nd Barnsley) – disbanded 16 February 1918 (some men to 13th Y&L)
- 94th MG Company – attached to 4th Gds Bde until 3 March, when it joined No 31 Bn, Machine Gun Corps
- 94th TMB – attached to 4th Gds Bde until 19 March, when it handed over its mortars to 4th Gds TMB and was disbanded

94th Brigade was reformed on 30 May 1918 and rejoined 31st Division the next day, with the following organisation for a short while:

- 2nd Loyal North Lancashire Regiment – joined from Palestine 4 June; transferred to 34th Division 22 June
- 2nd Royal Munster Fusiliers (RMF) – Training cadre only; absorbed 6th RMF from Palestine 6 June; transferred to Lines of Communication 16 June
- 2nd Royal Dublin Fusiliers (RDF) – Training cadre only; absorbed 7th RDF from Palestine 6 June; transferred to Lines of Communication 16 June
- 94th TMB – reformed 7 June with personnel from the three infantry battalions, but broken up on 16 June and the men rejoined their units

== 94th (Yeomanry) Brigade ==
Among the reinforcements from Palestine was the 74th (Yeomanry) Division composed of dismounted Yeomanry Cavalry regiments. On arrival in France it was reorganised on the same basis as the infantry divisions of the BEF, with only three battalions per brigade. This released three battalions that were assigned to 94th Bde, redesignated on 21 June as 94th (Yeomanry) Brigade:

- 12th (Norfolk Yeomanry) Battalion, Norfolk Regiment
- 12th (Ayr and Lanark Yeomanry) Battalion, Royal Scots Fusiliers
- 24th (Denbighshire Yeomanry) Battalion, Royal Welch Fusiliers
- 94th TMB – reformed 29 June with personnel from the three dismounted yeomanry battalions

=== La Becque ===
31st and 5th Divisions took part in Operation Borderland, a limited attack on La Becque and other fortified farms in front of the Forest of Nieppe on 28 June (the anniversary of the capture of Oppy Wood by the two divisions). The forest screened the assembly of troops and material, and the German positions were taken with only light casualties and quickly consolidated. The newly-formed 94th (Y) Brigade was in support for this operation and then took over the line on 30 June.

Individual units continued to make small advances through aggressive patrolling and seizing strongpoints (so-called 'peaceful penetration') and this accelerated when the Allies launched a coordinated offensive on 8 August. By now 31st Division was with Second Army. At 17.00 on 18 August 94th (Y) Bde and its neighbour 86th Bde of 29th Division launched an attack on Vieux-Berquin. Each brigade used a single battalion (12th Norfolks from 94th, 2nd Royal Fusiliers from 86th) preceded by a barrage fired by the whole of the divisional artillery. The two battalions gained all of the objectives within an hour and a half, taking outlying villages and reaching the vital Vieux-Berquin–Outtersteene road. This threatened the envelopment of the Germans' position in the Merville salient, and they pulled out on the night of 19/20 August. 31st Division pushed forward until running into serious opposition south of Ploegsteert on 21 August, where fighting continued into September.

=== Hundred Days Offensive ===
Second Army carried out a formal attack on the morning of 28 September (the Fifth Battle of Ypres) and 31st Division was ordered to watch for opportunities and take advantage of enemy weakening. At 11.00 the division was ordered to attack at 15.00, and the operation was rushed: 94th (Y) Bde had only left Hazebrouck that morning and had only reached Bailleul. The attack was held up by delayed orders and road congestion, and did not go in until after dark, nevertheless, 92nd Bde gained 2 miles (3.2 km) to reach the Warneton–Comines road by morning, while 93rd Bde was pushing through the western edge of Ploegsteert Wood. At 10.30 on 29 September the head of 94th (Y) Bde's column had reached Tilleul Fram, 2,000 yards (1,800 m) behind the other brigades. In the afternoon 31st Division was ordered to move up to the line of the River Lys, but 93rd Bde was judged to be too tired. That night 92nd and 94th (Y) Bdes occupied a line from le Quatre Rois Cabaret to Ultimo Crater, on the east side of Ploegsteert Wood which had been cleared during the afternoon. Next morning 94th (Y) Bde set off at 04.00, supporting the left of 92nd Bde. The brigade met no opposition until 06.00 when it reached the ridge overlooking the Lys and was halted by machine gun fire. However, the fired died away at 17.30 and the advance was continued to the river. By the end of 2 October the whole of the division was along the Lys and preparing to bridge the river. 12th Royal Scots Fusiluers took iup position on Hill63.

Patrols from 92nd Bde slipped across the Lys by raft during the night of 14/15 October and established posts on the far bank. The division crossed behind them and continued the advance from 16 October, facing no opposition until the morning of 19 October, but by the end of the day it was on the Tournai–Mouscron railway, with scouts well out in front, and in touch with Fifth Army to the south. While 93rd continued the advance, the rest of 31st Division was squeezed out between the two converging armies.

The division was back in the lead from 27 October, but the enemy 'did not appear disposed to give ground'. The superior German artillery was very active and deluged the area with shell and gas. All 92nd Bde could do was push a line of posts forward about 700 yards (640 m) in an attempt to suppress enemy machine gun fire. 94th (Y) Brigade then took over for a set-piece attack at Tieghem on 31 October. Three divisions attacked, each with one brigade in line, 94th (Y) with two battalions in the front line and one in support. German retaliation to the British barrage was weak, but machine gun teams in the farms and villages scattered across the country put up considerable fight. Following the barrage, the troops reached the first objective of Anseghem on schedule at 06.45. The divisions waited until after dark before advancing again. Patrols went forward and found the countryside clear, so the artillery barrages scheduled for the following morning were cancelled and 94th (Y) Bde with its right flank close to the River Schelde was ordered to advance northeastwards, clearing the ground between the river and the railway. The Germans had retired across the Schelde, and 94th (Y) Bde's patrols encountered no opposition, Having made contact with neighbouring French troops, 31st Division was withdrawn into reserve.

The division returned to the line on the night of 6/7 November. On 8 November Second Army issued orders for forcing a passage of the Schelde on 11 November. However, the Germans began to pull out on 8 November and by dawn British patrols had established posts across the river. Once the engineers had bridged the river, the pursuit began. When the Armistice with Germany came into force on 11 November, scouts from 31st Division were reporting that there were no enemy in front.

== Disbandment ==
The division began to pull back on 13 November, and by the end of the month was established in camps south of St-Omer and engaged in road repair. Demobilisation (chiefly of coal miners) began on 11 December and proceeded at a steadily increasing rate during early 1919. By April the battalions had been reduced to cadres.The division ceased to exist on 20 May and the cadres left for England on 22 May. They were then disbanded, the 12th RSF and 24th RWF on 28 May, and the 12th Norfolkl at Norwich on 3 June.

During the war the division's casualties amounted to 30,091 killed, wounded, and missing, of which the battalions of 94th Bde had suffered the following fatal casualties (other ranks only):

- 11th East Lancs: 732 (including later service with 92nd Bde)
- 12th Y&L: 427
- 13th Y&L: 475 (including later service with 93rd Bde)
- 14th Y&L: 324

94th (Y) Bde (from June 1918)

- 12th Norfolk: 97
- 12th RSF: 106
- 24th RWF: 80

94th Brigade was not reformed in World War II.

== Commanders ==
The following commanded 94th Bde:

- Brigadier-General J.R.M. Dalrymple-Hay, appointed to original 94th Bde 28 November 1914
- Brig-Gen H. Bowles, appointed to 115th Bde 28 December 1914
- Brig-Gen George Carter-Campbell, from 22 September 1915, sick 23 May 1916, returned 2 July 1916 until brigade broken up 17 February 1918
- Lt-Col A.W. Rickman, acting from 23 May 1916
- Brig-Gen Hubert Conway Rees, 15 June–2 July 1916
- Lt-Col G.B. Waudhope, acting 30 January–17 February 1918
- Brig-Gen A. Symons, appointed 1 June 1918, sick 3 November 1918
- Lt-Col John Sherwood-Kelly, VC, acting 3 November 1918
- Brig-Gen Hon Lesley James Probyn Butler, from 12 November 1918

== Insignia ==
The first pattern of formation sign worn by 31st Division is shown above. In 1917 it adopted a new sign incorporating the Red Rose of Lancaster and the White Rose of York with green stems on a black background; in Yorkshire units the white rose overlapped the red, for Lancashire units the red overlapped the white. The division also employed a system of 'battle patches' to identify brigades and units. In 1917 the sign for 94th Bde was a horizontally bisected square, red above white, worn by all ranks on the back, just below the collar. All ranks of 94th Bde wore coloured circles at the top of both sleeves to indicate their unit:

94th Brigade's Battle Patches

- 11th East Lancs: red
- 12th Y&L: green
- 13th Y&L: yellow
- 14th Y&L: blue
- 94th MG Company: black
- 94th TMB: white
