= 4th Guards Brigade =

4th Guards Brigade may refer to:

== German ==
- 4th Guards Cavalry Brigade (German Empire)
- 4th Guards Artillery Brigade (German Empire)
- 4th Guards Infantry Brigade (German Empire)

== Others ==
- 4th Guards Brigade (Croatia)
- 4th (Guards) Brigade designation for the British 4th Infantry Brigade at the outbreak of World War I
- 4th Guards Brigade (United Kingdom)
