= Will Streets =

English soldier and WWI poet (1886–1916)

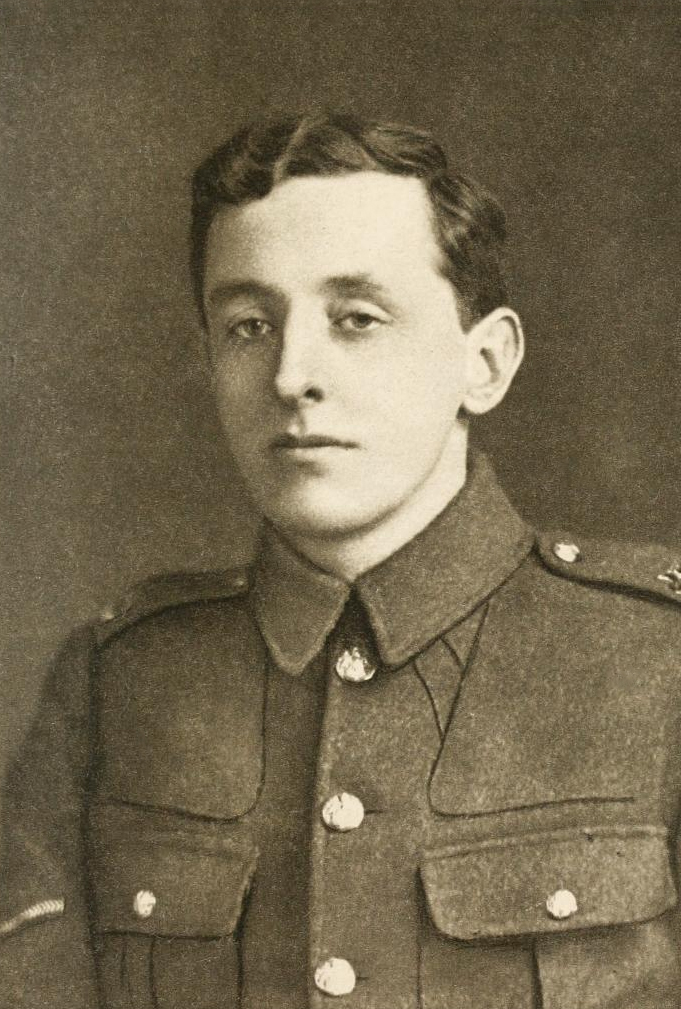
- Picture of Streets from For remembrance, soldier poets who have fallen in the war
- Born: John William Streets; 24 March 1886; Whitwell, Derbyshire, England
- Died: 1 July 1916 (aged 30); Somme, France
- Cause of death: Killed in action
- Occupations: Soldier, poet

John William Streets (24 March 1886 – 1 July 1916) was an English soldier and poet of the First World War.

Streets was born in Whitwell, Derbyshire, the son of William and Clara Streets, and was the eldest of twelve children. Although academically and artistically gifted, he began work as a miner at the age of fourteen, continuing to educate himself in his spare time.

In August 1914, Streets joined the Sheffield City Battalion (Sheffield Pals). In late 1915 and early 1916 he served in Egypt. The battalion was subsequently transferred to the Western Front. Streets, by this time a sergeant, was wounded on the first day of the Battle of the Somme, and subsequently went missing. His body was eventually recovered exactly ten months later, on 1 May 1917, and he is buried at Euston Road Cemetery, Colincamps, France. His poems were posthumously published in the same year under the title The Undying Splendour.

== See also ==
- List of solved missing person cases
