= Lesley Butler =

British Army general

Brigadier-General Lesley Butler CMG DSO DL
- Born: 22 April 1876
- Died: 31 December 1955 (aged 79)
- Military career
- Allegiance: United Kingdom
- Branch: British Army
- Service years: 1899–1922
- Rank: Brigadier-General
- Unit: Irish Guards
- Commands: 94th (Yeomanry) Brigade (1918); 4th Guards Brigade (1918); 60th Brigade (1915–1916); 2nd Battalion, Irish Guards (1915)
- Conflicts: Second Boer War; First World War
- Awards: Companion of the Order of St Michael and St George; Distinguished Service Order; Mentioned in Despatches (6)

Brigadier-General Lesley James Probyn Butler, CMG, DSO, DL (22 April 1876 – 31 December 1955) was an officer of the Irish Guards.

== Military career ==
Butler was born on 22 April 1876, the son of the 26th Baron Dunboyne.

He was commissioned a second lieutenant in the 3rd (Militia) Battalion of the Durham Light Infantry on 1 December 1899. After the outbreak of the Second Boer War earlier that year, a number of militia battalions were called up for active service. Butler went to South Africa, and on 28 March 1900 was transferred to a commission with a regular battalion in the regiment. For his service in the war, he was awarded the Queen's South Africa Medal with four clasps. He later transferred to the Irish Guards.

On 27 January 1913 he was seconded from his regiment and appointed as a brigade major.

Butler served in the First World War from 1914 to 1918, being mentioned in despatches six times and receiving the brevet rank of lieutenant colonel, the Distinguished Service Order in 1916 and being appointed a Companion of the Order of St Michael and St George in the 1917 Birthday Honours.

He retired from the army in 1922.

== Personal life ==
Butler was married in 1907 to Mary Christal, youngest daughter of Sir John Heathcoat-Amory, 1st Baronet; they had one son and two daughters. She died in 1951. He lived at Calverleigh Cottage, Tiverton, Devon, and was a deputy lieutenant for the county. He died on 31 December 1955.

Military offices
Preceded by John William Gascoigne Roy	Commander, 60th Brigade; 1915–1916	Succeeded by Francis John Duncan
Preceded by Lord Ardee	Commander, 4th Guards Brigade; 1918	Brigade disbanded
Preceded by Adolphe Symons	Commander, 94th (Yeomanry) Brigade; 1918	Brigade disbanded
