= Preston Pals =

English volunteer fighters for France in WWI

The Preston Pals — officially 'D' Company, 7th (Service) Battalion, Loyal North Lancashire Regiment — were a group of men from the town of Preston in Lancashire, England, who volunteered to fight in France during World War I, and took part in the Battle of the Somme.

== Formation ==
The Pals parade in Preston Flagged Market

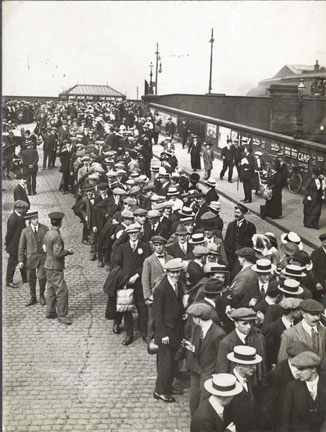
The Pals outside Preston railway station

Soon after the outbreak of war between Great Britain and Germany on 4 August 1914, Earl Kitchener, the War Minister, laid plans to raise a "New Army" of volunteer recruits. To aid this scheme, he encouraged local councils to establish what became known as Pals battalions, made up of groups of friends and neighbours who were keen to fight alongside each other, rather than being individually assigned to regular army regiments.

The raising of the Preston Pals was first proposed by Mr Cyril Cartmell, son of the Mayor of Preston, Councillor (later Sir) Harry Cartmell. On 31 August 1914, Cyril Cartmell placed the following advertisement in The Lancashire Daily Post:

"It is proposed to form a Company of young businessmen, clerks, etc, to be drawn from Preston and the surrounding districts, and be attached, if practicable, to a battalion of the Loyal North Lancashire Regiment. Will those who would like to join apply here any afternoon or evening this week – the earlier the better."

Within two days, 250 local men had volunteered for service, and the "Preston Businessmen and Clerks' Company" — officially 'D' Company, 7th (Service) Battalion, Loyal North Lancashire Regiment —, was formed. Three other companies making up the 7th (Service) Battalion were filled by Pals from Blackpool, Kirkham, and Chorley. The men were medically examined at the Public Hall, and on 7 September 1914, the Pals paraded before an enthusiastic and patriotic crowd in the Market Place before marching along Fishergate to the railway station and leaving the town for their training.

The 'Pals Battalions' required extensive training before they could be allowed onto the battlefield. The Preston Pals did their training at Tidworth Camp, Bulford and Swindon before crossing over to Boulogne on 17 July 1915, together with the rest of the 19th (Western) Division, of which the battalion was a part. Once in France, training for trench warfare and gas attacks continued for a further two months.

== War service ==
=== Battle of Loos 1915 ===
In September 1915, exactly twelve months after their formation, the Preston Pals took a minor part in the Battle of Loos, and received their first casualties. The losses were reported by the Preston Guardian and the Lancashire Daily Post, with each soldier's obituary accompanied by details of his school and church associations, the firm he worked for before enlistment, and the football or cricket teams he had played with. The fact that the men had fought under the particular identity of the town meant their deaths were mourned not only by their families, but by the community as a whole.

=== Battle of the Somme 1916 ===
The 7th Battalion of the Loyal North Lancashire Regiment was in the order of battle for the first day of the Battle of the Somme, on 1 July 1916. The battalion was to take part in an assault against the German lines in late afternoon, but by this time, it was apparent that the initial assault had been a catastrophic failure, which brought about a cancellation of further attacks. Thus, the Preston Pals escaped the heavy losses that were suffered by many other Pals battalions that day.

The Preston Pals were engaged in the Somme battle for the whole of July 1916, and they took part in the desperate fighting around High Wood, Delville Wood, Fricourt, and Guillemont. By mid-July, only 480 riflemen out of an original strength of 900 remained. During August and September 1916, the Battalion served in the Flanders sector, only to return to the Somme again as the battle entered its final phase.

By the time the Battle of the Somme ended, in mid-November 1916, the 7th Battalion of the Loyals retained little of its former identity. Many of the original Pals had joined other units, and casualties had been replaced by new drafts from the UK.

=== Flanders 1917 ===
Following further heavy casualties in the Flanders campaigns of 1917, the 7th Battalion of the Loyals was officially disbanded in February 1918.

== Notable recruits ==
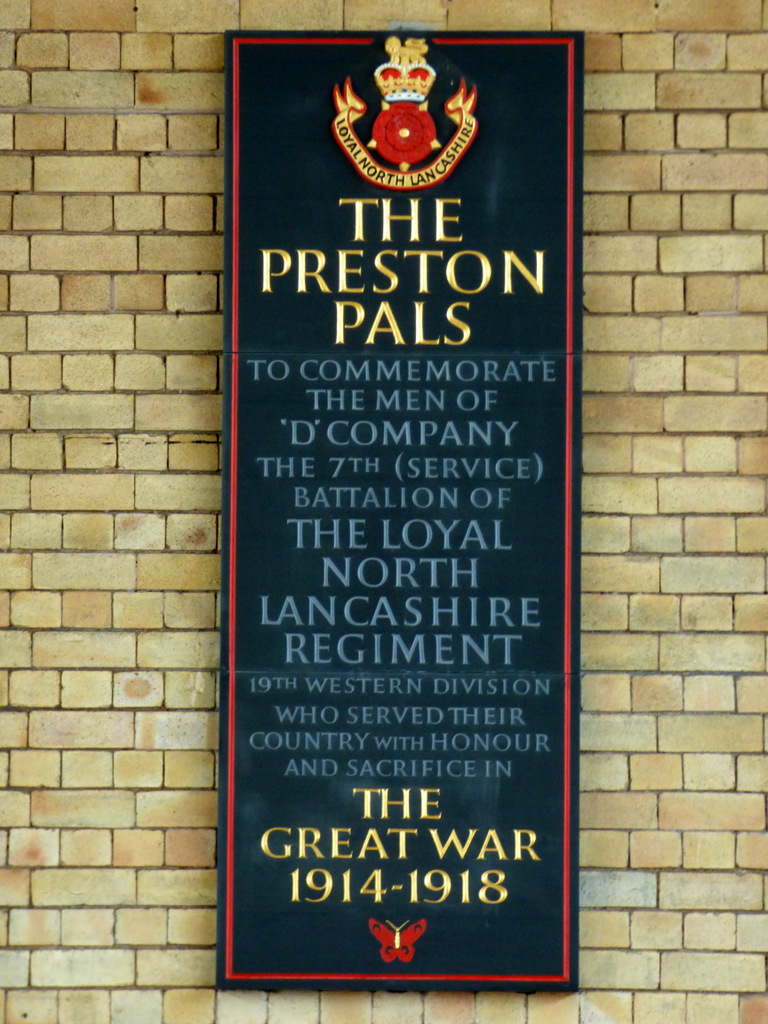
Memorial tablet to the Preston Pals at Preston railway station

The first officer of the Preston Pals to be killed in action, in February 1916, was Lieutenant Maurice Bannister, son of the vicar of St George's Church. Another recruit was Private Hugh Carnegie Rain, the son of Will Onda (Hugh Rain), a former stage acrobat and performer who was a film maker, distributor and cinema proprietor in Preston. Corporal Frank Wood, of Connaught Road, Broadgate, was the first member of Orchard Methodist Church to become a casualty in the war. He had formerly worked for Merigold Brothers in the Old Vicarage.

Lieutenant Harold Fazackerly, of Ashton, won the Military Cross and Bar before being killed in action in August 1916. Lieutenant Horace J. Lancaster, of Penwortham, also won the Military Cross.

One of the last surviving members of the Preston Pals who served in France was James Collier Nickeas. He died in 1986, in a Barrow hospital, aged 93. His father once ran the Alexandra ballroom and cinema in Walker Street, Preston.

== Commemoration ==
=== Preston Pals Memorial ===
The Preston Pals are commemorated by a memorial tablet at Preston railway station, from where they left Preston for training on 7 September 1914.

=== Preston War Memorial ===
A war memorial was raised up in 1926 to commemorate Preston's dead in the Great War. It overlooks the spot in Market Place where the Preston Pals first paraded before heading for Preston railway station.

== See also ==
- Recruitment to the British army during WW I
- List of Pals battalions
