= 4th Guards Brigade (United Kingdom) =

- Active: 8 February – 17 November 1918
- Country: United Kingdom
- Branch: British Army
- Type: Infantry
- Size: Brigade
- Part of: 31st Division
- Engagements: World War I: German spring offensive: Battle of Bapaume; First Battle of Arras; Battle of the Lys: Defence of Nieppe Forest

Commanders
- Notable commanders: Lord Ardee; Hon Harold Alexander; Hon L.J.P. Butler

The 4th Guards Brigade was an infantry formation of the British Army during World War I. It was formed from battalions withdrawn from the Guards Division and served with the 31st Division on the Western Front during the last year of the war. It fought during the German spring offensive, distinguishing itself at the Defence of Nieppe Forest. Taken out of the line after its heavy casualties, the brigade spent the last months of the war as General Headquarters Troops, including a period as a motorised column, before being broken up in the Guards Division after the Armistice.

== Origin ==
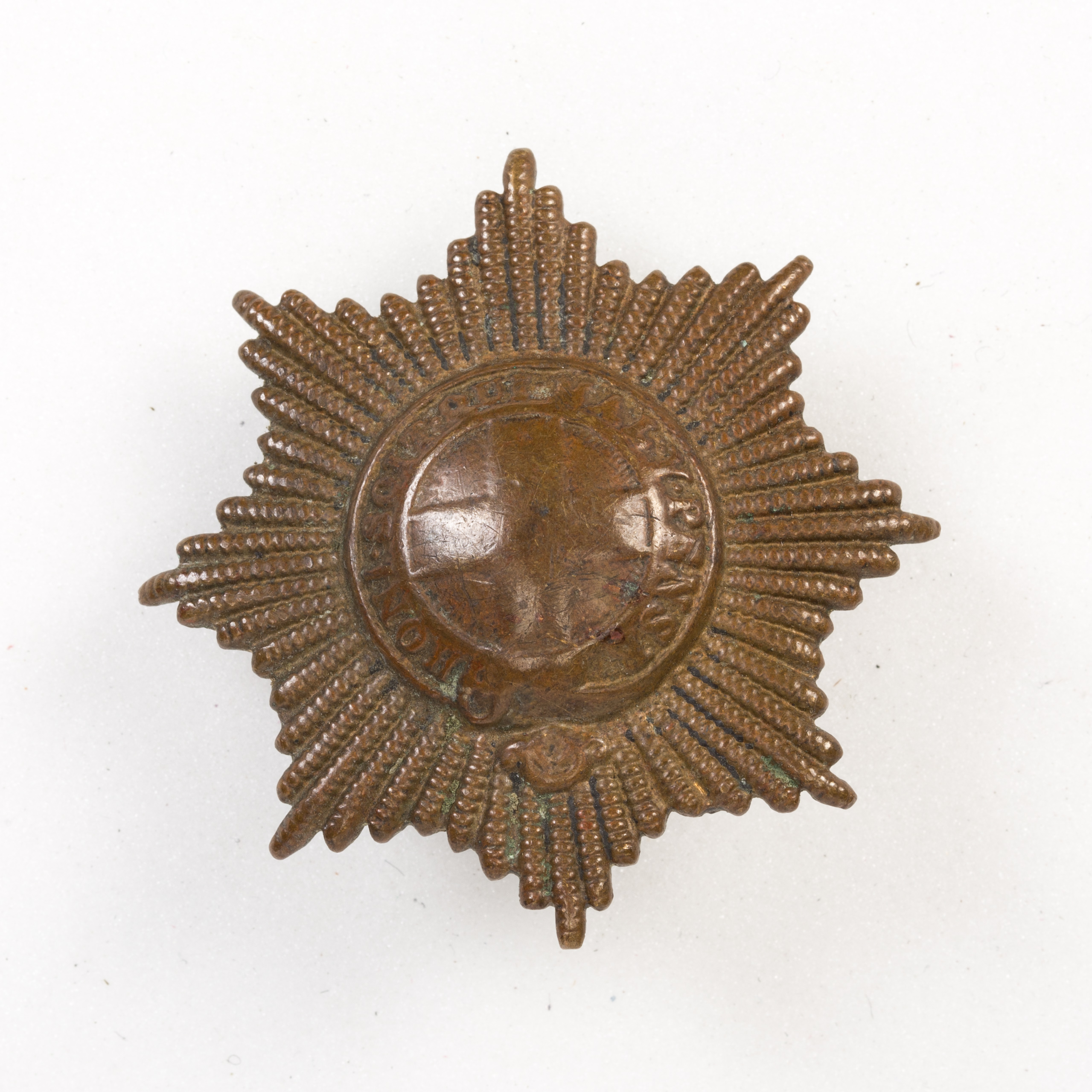
Cap badge of the Coldstream Guards

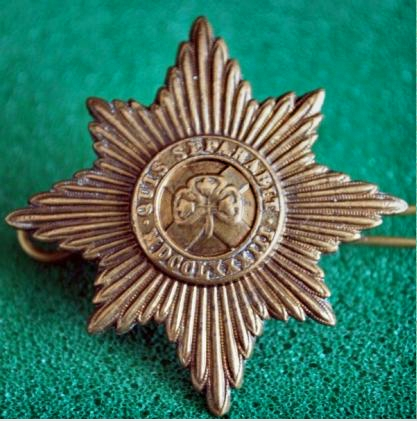
Cap badge of the Irish Guards

The Guards Division was formed in France in August 1915, bringing together all 12 frontline battalions of the British Army's Foot guards, organised into three brigades. (Note: The new 1st Guards Brigade had previously been designated 4th (Guards) Brigade) It saw action at the Battles of Loos, the Somme, Third Ypres and Cambrai. In February 1918, in response to a manpower shortage on the Western Front, the British Expeditionary Force (BEF) reduced all its British infantry brigades (Note: As distinct from the Australian, Canadian and New Zealand brigades and those serving in other theatres, which remained on a four-battalion basis.) from four to three battalions. Many of the war-formed battalions thus released were broken up for reinforcements, but the three Guards battalions were assembled into a new 4th Guards Brigade. This was formed on 8 February 1918 under the command of Brigadier-General Lord Ardee and at noon on the same day was assigned to replace 94th Brigade in 31st Division. This was a 'Kitchener's Army' formation that had suffered terrible casualties on the Somme. The new brigade had the following organisation:

- 4th Battalion, Grenadier Guards
- 3rd Battalion, Coldstream Guards
- 2nd Battalion, Irish Guards
- 94th Signal Section, Royal Engineers – joined Brigade Headquarters (HQ) 11 February 1918
- 94th Company, Machine Gun Corps (MGC) – attached until 3 March 1918, when it joined No 31 Battalion, MGC, as C Company
- 94th Brigade Trench Mortar Battery (TMB) – attached until 19 March 1918, when it handed over its Stokes mortars to 4th Guards Brigade TMB and was disbanded'
- 4th Guards Brigade TMB – formed on 18 March 1918

A number of the personnel for Lord Ardee's brigade HQ came from the disbanded 12th (Service) Battalion, York and Lancaster Regiment (Sheffield) of 94th Bde, some men of which had also been drafted to the Grenadier Guards.

== War service ==
Between 8 and 11 February the three battalions marched from Arras to join 31st Division in the Bailleul–Willerval sector of the British line. After a few days' training, the brigade went up into the line on the night of 17 February. Two nights later the Germans raided the line in an attempt to obtain prisoners or other identification of the new formation that had appeared opposite them. The raid failed as the 4th Grenadiers in the front line 'dealt rudely' with the intruders, but the couple of hours of fighting with artillery support was a good rehearsal of the new 'defence in depth' policy. However, by the time the German spring offensive opened on 21 March 1918, 31st Division was in GHQ reserve, with 4th Gds Bde in the area of Tincques, east of St Pol.

=== Battle of Bapaume ===
At 01.00 on 22 March 4th Gds Bde was moved to reinforce Third Army. The troops were taken by ex-London buses and on the night of 22/23 March 31st Division carried out a partial relief of 34th Division. 34th Division had been forced back to the rear of its Battle Zone, but there was little activity on 23 March, 4th Gds Bde holding a line astride the Sensée river under intermittent shellfire and using rifle fire to prevent enemy parties from massing in front or penetrating round the flanks. Heavier fighting had been going on further south round Mory, and during the night of 23/24 March 31st Division sideslipped about 1,000 yards (910 m) in that direction. The trenches were part of the 'Army Line' or 'Green Line', but had only been dug to a depth of about 3 feet (1 m). On 24 March the enemy massed to make their main effort against the village of Ervillers, standing on the Mory spur, the capture of which would render the Green Line untenable. 4th Guards Bde formed a defensive flank facing southeast to guard the Sensée valley and enfilade any attack on Ervillers. The battalions (particularly 2nd Irish Guards) held their fire until the German troops had pushed well forward, and then overwhelmed them with rifles and machine guns positioned on the forward slope of the Ervillers spur. The attack faded away. 93rd Brigade of 31st Division was also heavily attacked north of the Sensée, and in the afternoon there were reports that the Germans had broken through here and were in rear of 4th Gds Bde, but these were false. However, the divisions further south were being forced back, and during the night 4th Gds Bde was ordered to sideslip again during the night, to relieve 119th Bde of 40th Division and form a pivot for these formations. 2nd Irish Guards moved round behind 4th Gds Bde to take over trenches that had already been dug by 3rd Coldstream Guards. However, the Germans attacked at 22.00, just as 119th Bde was withdrawing, and they entered the trenches at the same time as the Guards. Hand to hand fighting followed, and some Germans got through to Ervillers, but with the help of 40th Division's reserve, 4th Gds Bde was able to restore the line. By morning, 4th Gds and the weak units of 119th Bde, much mixed up and all under the command of Lord Ardee, held a defensive flank along the Ervillers–Saint-Léger road. They were in touch with 31st Division's reserve, 92nd Bde, which had come up to fill the gap to the south. For hours afterwards lost groups of Germans were wandering around or hiding amongst the positions and had to be rounded up. Although German artillery and aircraft were active, there was no attack on this front during 25 March, though the Guards Division half a mile (800 m) to the north was attacked. This attack was destroyed by British artillery fire, and the watching troops of 4th Gds Bde complained that they were not given a fair chance to use their rifles against this target.

However, although the Ervillers pivot was still firmly held, Third Army had been forced back both north and south, Bapaume had been evacuated, and during the night of 25/26 March 31st and Guards Divisions swung back in conformity. Their new line ran from Ablainzevelle through Moyenneville to the Boisleux-Saint-Marc ridge, with 92nd Bde on the right, 93rd on the left next to Guards Division, and 4th Gds Bde in reserve around Ayette. 3rd Grenadier Guards was stationed on the high ground south west of the village, 4th Grenadier Guards in its rear, and 2nd Irish Guards on the hilly spur to the north east. Ayette itself was not occupied, the crossfire from the spurs behind being relied on for its defence. All three battalions began digging in. However, in falling back a gap had opened up between the two divisions, and at daybreak Moyenneville was found to be unoccupied. The Germans quickly seized it, but 15th/17th West Yorkshire Regiment of 93rd Bde put in a surprise counter-attack and regained the village. A much stronger German attack in the afternoon, with artillery support, drove the West Yorkshires out again, but reinforced by a company of 2nd Irish Guards, they clung onto a position round the village. Lord Ardee received a report that the Germans had broken through to south, so he moved 4th Grenadier Guards to the threatened flank wheres they fortified Quesnoy Farm and got into contact with the neighbouring 40th Division (the report was exaggerated). Soon afterwards, communications between the brigades and Divisional HQ broke down, and Ardee found himself commanding all three brigades for a while. Later orders came through from Divisional HQ to extend the defensive flank to the south even further, but Ardee considered it out of the question with the troops he had; soon afterwards the report of the German breakthrough was contradicted.

=== Battle of Arras ===
Next day, 27 March, the early German advances were held off by artillery fire, but soon after 11.00 German infantry came 'dribbling' forward (Stormtrooper tactics rather than mass attacks) and maintained a continuous attack on 31st Division's front for five hours. 92nd Brigade held on at Ayette with support from two companies of 4th Grenadier Guards. By now the Germans had established themselves on both flanks, and at dusk the 92nd and 93rd brigades withdrew through 4th Gds Bde, which was holding good trenches 2,000 yards (1,800 m) in their rear. A large German force formed up on an airfield near Ayette, with the intention of following up, but it was dispersed by artillery fire. After that the attacks stopped and nothing more needed to be done other than fill gaps in the line. Ardee was gassed during the afternoon and had to be evacuated, Lt-Col the Hon Harold Alexander of 2nd Irish Guards taking temporary command of the brigade. Next morning the Germans persisted in attacking what was now a strongly-held position. 4th Guards Bde was in front with a battalion of 93rd Bde, and 97th Bde of 32nd Division, just arrived, was in support. The German infantry attacked at 07.30, driving in the outposts, but was forced back with heavy casualties by the Guards' fire and then a counter-attack. Another failed attempt was made at 09.00, and a third at 10.30 after an hour's artillery bombardment, which got close to 3rd Grenadier Guards' positions, but all failed. Masses of infantry in marching order were observed crossing the skyline and were shot down in large numbers before they reached the line. Afterwards figures could be seen running in every direction. 31st Division's commander even sent up his pioneer battalion (12th King's Own Yorkshire Light Infantry (KOYLI)) ready to make a counter-attack. Another German attack in the afternoon was broken up solely by British field artillery fire, and a final unsuccessful attempt was made to break through at Ayette at 18.45. Although sniping and patrolling continued, the German offensive had ended in this sector, and 31st Division was relieved on 31 March. 4th Guards Bde went back to Bienvillers, having lost 14 officers and 372 other ranks.

=== Defence of Nieppe Forest ===
31st Division was sent to rest billets in the Monchy-Breton area, with 4th Gds Bde in and around Chelers. Here, Brig-Gen the Hon Lesley Butler (Irish Guards) arrived to take command of the brigade, and reinforcement drafts for the shattered battalions joined from the UK. The rest period ended after the Germans launched the second phase of their spring offensive on 9 April. This came in against First Army, breaking through the Portuguese Expeditionary Corps, and was widened on 10 April (the Battle of Estaires). During the night of 10/11 April, 31st Division was ordered from GHQ Reserve to join First Army, but although 4th Gds Bde received its orders at midnight, the buses did not arrive until 09.00, and it was not until 12 hours later that the brigade reached Strazeele. The other two brigades of the division had already been in action all afternoon. However, as soon as the men of 4th Gds Bde, tired after their disrupted journey, had got into bivouacs, orders arrived to rouse them and send them to restore the position in front. No 2 Company Irish Guards was sent south down the Vieux-Berquin road to make contact with any friendly troops still in front and came under fire. By morning the brigade was in line, filling the gap between two brigades of 50th (Northumbrian) Division, with 3rd Coldstream Guards on the right and 4th Grenadier Guards on the left. The ground was flat, intersected by hedges and lanes, with the Nieppe Forest behind and to the right of the Guards.

At daylight the German artillery began bombarding the position, guided by observation balloons, in preparation to break through to Hazebrouck. 2nd Irish Guards in reserve came in for particular attention. At about 08.00 strong bodies of German infantry advanced, but they were driven back by rifle and machine gun fire before they could reach the trenches of the Grenadiers and Coldstream. The brigade was then ordered to advance to prevent the enemy using the Merville–Neuf-Berquin road. 3rd Coldstream Guards immediately came under heavy crossfire from a village that had been reported clear of the enemy. Nevertheless it advanced about 400 yards (370 m), while the right of 4th Grenadiers was stopped by German artillery and machine guns sweeping a stream crossing in front. The brigade now found itself with enemy troops pushing into the gaps on either flank. Two companies of 2nd Irish Guards extended the Grenadiers' line, while on the left the gap was blocked by 31st Division's pioneer, battalion, 12th KOYLI, which was placed under Butler's command. Although 12th KOYLI were pushed back a little, they formed a defensive flank and 4th Gds Bde held onto its positions until nightfall, though casualties were heavy. 95th Brigade from 5th Division in front of the forest was sent to relieve the Guards during the night, but could not complete the relief before daylight. After dark the Guards dug in where they could, assisted by 210th Field Company, Royal Engineers. The position covered 4,000 yards (3,700 m) of farm buildings and scraps of trench, 3rd Coldstream on the right, 4th Grenadiers in the centre, and 12th KOYLI on the left, with 2nd Irish Guards in reserve. On the morning of 13 April the enemy pushed forward under cover of morning mist. 2nd Irish Guards received a report that the enemy had broken through between the Coldstream and Grenadiers: No 3 Company was sent forward, but was never heard of again. It was presumably surrounded and wiped out as the enemy lapped round the brigade's left where other troops had retired. The enemy attacked in strength in the afternoon, and the line was broken into individual detachments, the 12th KOYLI being blown out of its trenches at Vieux-Berquin by enemy artillery. The right of the battalion fell back 500 yards (460 m) but the left held firm and its enfilade fire caused heavy losses on the Germans attempting to advance beyond the village. A German armoured car (captured from the Italians) appeared on a road opposite the right, but was driven off. A gap in the Irish Guards' line was filled with the men of the Trench Mortar Battery and a company of 1st Duke of Cornwall's Light Infantry from 95th Bde. Another gap in the line was blocked by the Irish Guards and the support company of 3rd Coldstream, only 30 strong. Captain Thomas Pryce reported that his left flank company of 4th Grenadiers was surrounded and fighting back to back; an Irish Guards company sent to assist was also surrounded, and reduced to one non-commissioned officer (NCO) and six men by the end of the day. Pryce and his company held on until ammunition ran out in the evening. They then made two bayonet charges in an attempt to break out: only one man got away. However, the last enemy thrust was successfully held off by 3rd Coldstream Guards and the battalion HQ of 4th Grenadiers. 1st Australian Division had now arrived by train at Hazebrouck, and coming forward made contact with 4th Gds Bde's left. The survivors of 4th Gds Bde fell back about a mile to the Australian outpost line, where they were collected together and remained in the line on the Australians' right. They spent all next morning firing at enemy troops manoeuvring in their front as the Germans tried to attack the Australians, but the Guards themselves were not troubled. That was the last attack in the sector: the enemy thrust on Hazebrouck had been halted. The brigade was relieved on the night of 14/15 April, having suffered casualties of 39 officers and 1244 other ranks between 12 and 14 April, leaving only 250 fit men. Field Marshal Sir Douglas Haig praised the brigade's defence and Capt Pryce was awarded a posthumous Victoria Cross for his gallant defence.

4th Guards Bde was taken back to billets behind the forest by buses – some of which were destroyed by enemy shellfire – and reorganised over the next few days. 4th Grenadiers and 3rd Coldstream could only muster two companies each and were temporarily amalgamated, while the pioneers of 12th KOYLI were temporarily retained as the third battalion. The back areas and forest were heavily shelled with mustard gas by the Germans, forcing the troops out into the fields. On 17–18 April 4th Gds and 92nd Bdes relieved an Australian brigade in the reserve line, where they worked on improving the defences of Hazebrouck. Then on 19 April they moved up through the forest into the support line along its fringe. Here they were repeatedly shelled with gas: the Brigade major and staff captain of 4th Gds were both affected and evacuated on 22 April, followed by Brig-Gen Butler two days later. Lieutenant-Col Alexander assumed temporary command once more. On the night of 23/24 April, 2 officers and 80 men of Nos 2 & 4 Companies 2nd Irish Guards, supported by an artillery, machine gun and trench mortar barrage, raided Beaulieu Farm taking some 25 prisoners and causing significant damage, for casualties of 7 slightly wounded. The brigade was then relieved and spent three weeks at Hondeghem, between Hazebrouck and Cassel, where it constructed defences and absorbed a few replacements.

=== GHQ Troops ===
On 20 May, 4th Gds Bde was transferred from 31st Division to GHQ Reserve, being replaced in the division by a new 94th Bde reconstructed from dismounted Yeomanry cavalry from the Palestine campaign. 4th Guards Bde was moved by bus and train to the Third Army area, where it was sent to work on the 'GHQ Line' of final defences in front of Barly Wood in case the Germans renewed their offensive in the Arras–Amiens sector. The battalions now began to be used to supply reinforcements to those in Guards Division and became progressively weaker. On 11–12 June the brigade was moved to the La Cauchie area to work on the defences there. Then on 6 July it moved to Criel-sur-Mer where it established a Young Officers' School under the brigade commander. 2nd Irish Guards was already acting as an NCO training unit.

In September, after the Allied counter-offensive had begun (the Hundred Days Offensive) 4th Grenadiers and 3rd Coldstream were placed under the orders of the Cavalry Corps and formed part of a mobile column known as 4th Guards Brigade Column. This was a force of all arms intended to advance in lorries and cars, entirely independent of horse transport:

- 4th Bn Grenadier Guards
- 3rd Bn Coldstream Guards
- 1st Bn Honourable Artillery Company
- A/58 Battery, Royal Field Artillery
- Bridging train

Before the end of September the column was moved up to Bray-sur-Somme with the possibility of it being sent into action with Le Cateau as its objective. Although the hoped-for cavalry breakthrough did not materialise on 8 October, and the column was bombed by German aircraft, it was employed next day. In conjunction with the Household Cavalry Machine Gun Battalion and the corps cyclists, it pushed forwards up the Montbrehain–Brancourt–Prémont road, coming under enemy artillery fire. The column reached Gouy-le-Catelet on 11 October, but took no part in the operations. It was broken up on 16 October, and the two Guards battalions returned to Criel.

=== Disbandment ===
Hostilities ended on 11 November when the Armistice with Germany entered into force. Three days later 4th Gds Bde entrained to join the Guards Division at Maubeuge on 17 November. There brigade HQ and the TMB were broken up, and the three battalions rejoined their original brigades. Guards Division then advanced to Cologne as part of the British Army of the Rhine.

== Commanders ==
The brigade had the following commanders:

From	Name	Notes
8 February 1918	Brigadier-General Lord Ardee	gassed, 27 March 1918
27 March 1918	Lieutenant-Colonel Hon. H.R.L.G. Alexander	acting
4 April 1918	Brigadier-General Hon. L.J.P. Butler	gassed, 24 April 1918
24 April 1918	Lieutenant-Colonel Hon. H.R.L.G. Alexander	acting
27 April 1918	Lieutenant-Colonel R.B.J. Crawfurd	acting
7 May 1918	Brigadier-General Hon. L.J.P. Butler	

== See also ==
- Guards Division

== Bibliography ==
- Maj A.F. Becke,History of the Great War: Order of Battle of Divisions, Part 1: The Regular British Divisions, London: HM Stationery Office, 1934/Uckfield: Naval & Military Press, 2007, ISBN 1-847347-38-X.
- Maj A.F. Becke,History of the Great War: Order of Battle of Divisions, Part 3b: New Army Divisions (30–41) and 63rd (R.N.) Division, London: HM Stationery Office, 1939/Uckfield: Naval & Military Press, 2007, ISBN 1-847347-41-X.
- Brig-Gen Sir James E. Edmonds, History of the Great War: Military Operations, France and Belgium 1918, Vol I, The German March Offensive and its Preliminaries, London: Macmillan, 1935/Imperial War Museum and Battery Press, 1995, ISBN 0-89839-219-5/Uckfield: Naval & Military Press, 2009, ISBN 978-1-84574-725-1.
- Brig-Gen Sir James E. Edmonds, History of the Great War: Military Operations, France and Belgium 1918, Vol II, March–April: Continuation of the German Offensives, London: Macmillan, 1937/Imperial War Museum and Battery Press, 1995, ISBN 1-87042394-1/Uckfield: Naval & Military Press, 2009, ISBN 978-1-84574-726-8.
- Brig-Gen Sir James E. Edmonds & Lt-Col R. Maxwell-Hyslop, History of the Great War: Military Operations, France and Belgium 1918, Vol V, 26th September–11th November, The Advance to Victory, London: HM Stationery Office, 1947/Imperial War Museum and Battery Press, 1993, ISBN 1-870423-06-2/Uckfield: Naval & Military Press, 2021, ISBN 978-1-78331-624-3.
- Lt-Col Cuthbert Headlam, History of the Guards Division in the Great War 1915–1918, Vol 2, London: John Murray, 1924/Uckfield: Naval & Military Press, 2001, ISBN 978-1-84342-322-5.
- Andrew Jackson, Accrington's Pals: The Full Story, Barnsley, Pen & Sword, 2013, ISBN 978-1-84884-469-8.
- Brig E.A. James, British Regiments 1914–18, London: Samson Books, 1978, ISBN 0-906304-03-2/Uckfield: Naval & Military Press, 2001, ISBN 978-1-84342-197-9.
- Rudyard Kipling, The Irish Guards in the Great War: The Second Battalion, London, 1923/Staplehurst: Spelmount, 1997, ISBN 1-873376-83-9.
- Laurie Milner, Leeds Pals: A History of the 15th (Service) Battalion (1st Leeds), The Prince of Wales's Own (West Yorkshire Regiment) 1914–1918, 2nd Edn, Barnsley: Pen & Sword, 2015, ISBN 978-1-47384-181-9.
- Richard A. Sparling, History of the 12th Service Battalion York & Lancaster Regiment, Sheffield: J.W. Northend, 1920/Uckfield: Naval & Military Press, 2009, ISBN 978-1-84734-978-1.
- Order of Battle of the British Armies in France, November 11th, 1918, France: General Staff, GHQ 1918.
