= Queens Cemetery, Puisieux =

Queens Cemetery
- Interactive map of Queens Cemetery

Details
- Established: 1917
- Location: Puisieux, Pas-de-Calais
- Country: France
- Coordinates: 50.10563°N 2.65811°E
- No. of graves: 311
- Find a Grave: Queens Cemetery

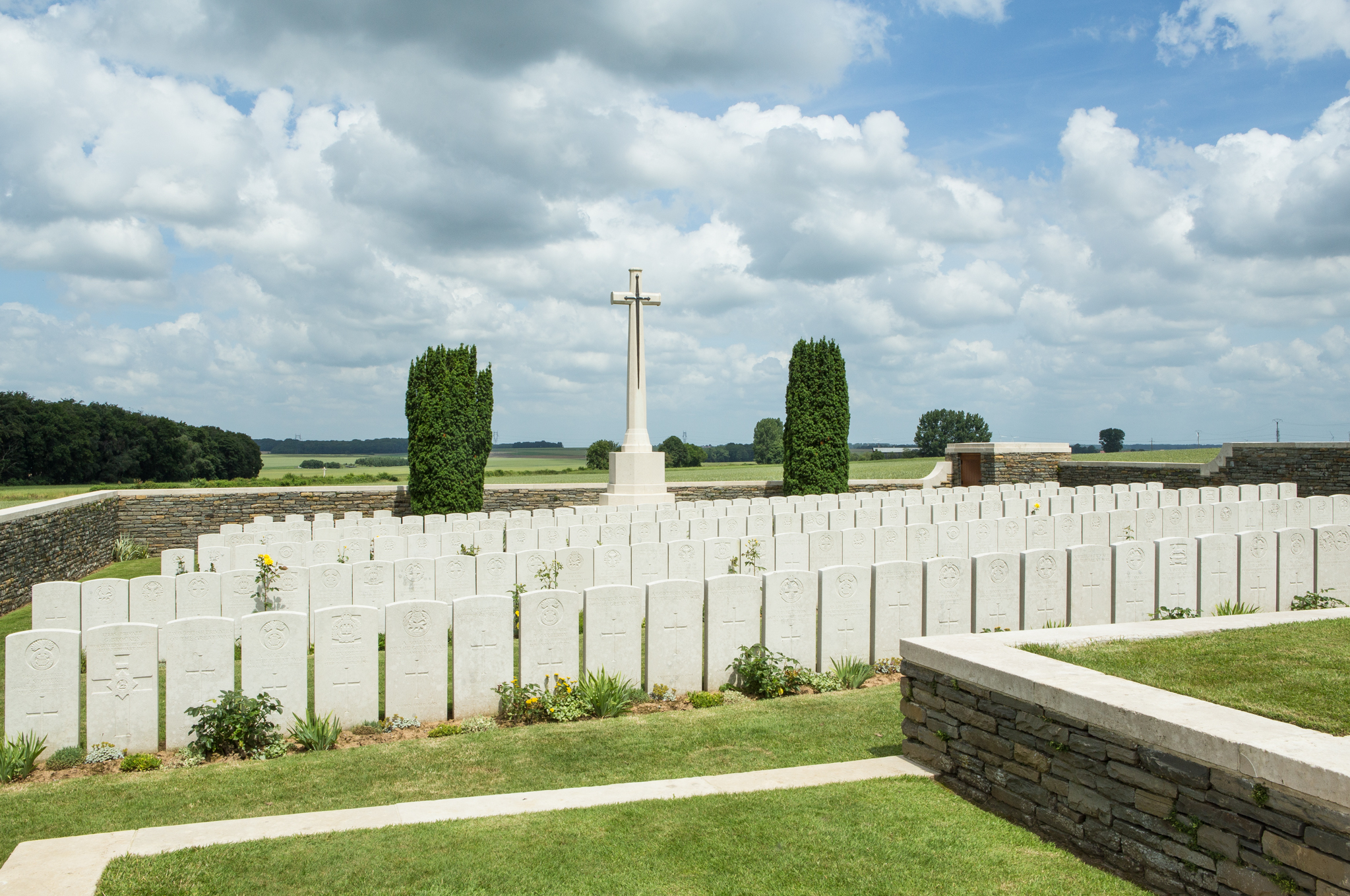
Queens Cemetery, Puisieux, Pas-de-Calais

Queens Cemetery (originally known as Queens V Corps Cemetery No 4) is a cemetery near the French commune of Puisieux, Pas-de-Calais, managed by the Commonwealth War Graves Commission.

It is located near to the Sheffield Memorial Park and a number of other small military cemeteries including the Luke Copse British Cemetery, Railway Hollow Cemetery and Serre Road Cemetery, No.3. It was designed Noel Ackroyd Rew.

The cemetery is located on what was the front line of the British forces during July 1916 at the Battle of the Somme. In early to mid 1917, the Somme and Ancre battlefields were cleared by V Corps and a number of new cemeteries were made including Queens Cemetery.

The First World War graves date from July 1916 through to February 1917 and are from the 31st, 3rd and 19th Divisions. There are 311 burials, with 181 having been identified as being from the United Kingdom and 130 are unidentified.
