= Sheffield City Battalion =

World War I British battalion

The Sheffield City Battalion 12th (Service) Battalion, York and Lancaster Regiment (Sheffield)
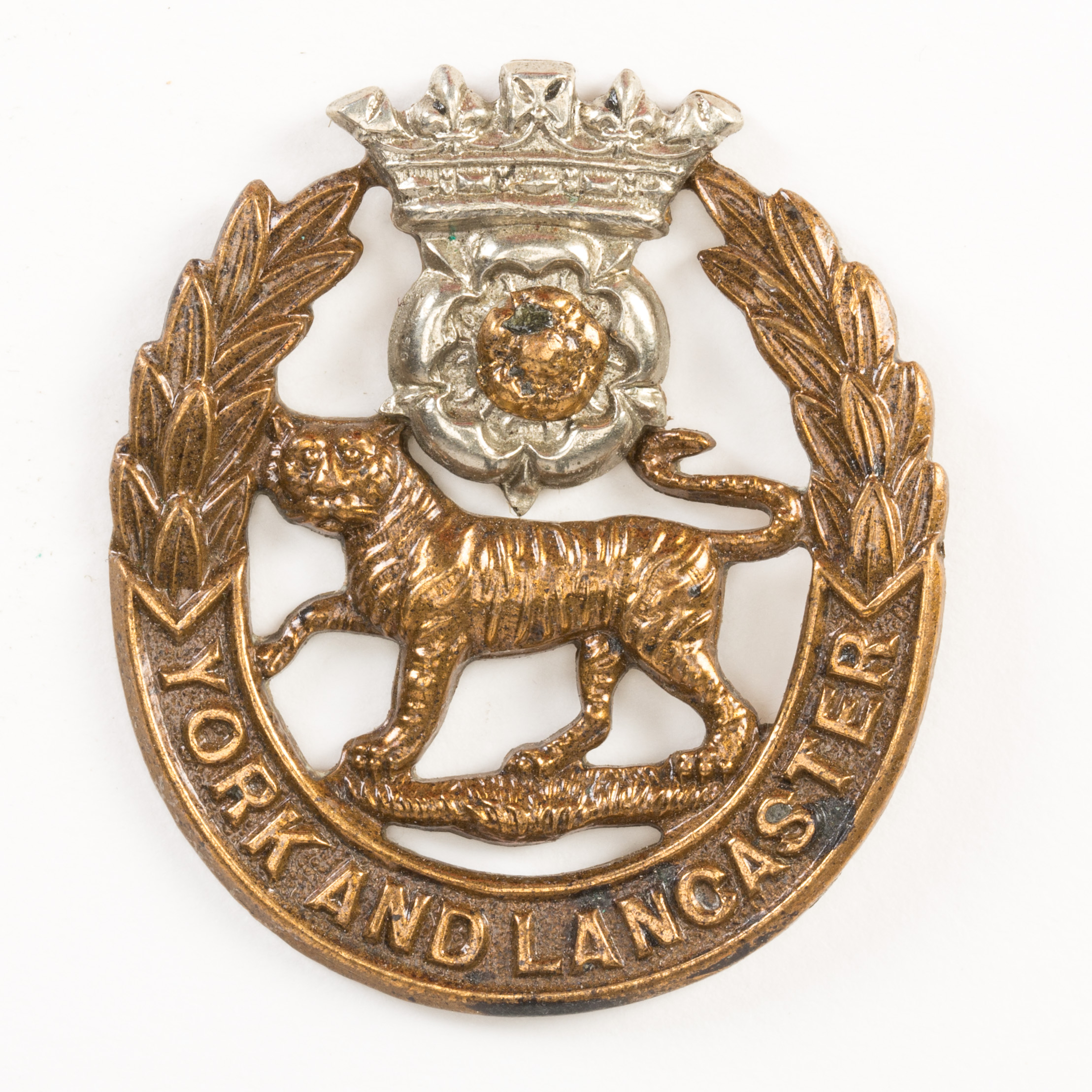
- Cap badge of the York & Lancaster Regiment
- Active: 5 September 1914–15 February 1918
- Allegiance: United Kingdom
- Branch: New Army
- Type: Pals battalion
- Role: Infantry
- Size: One Battalion
- Part of: 31st Division
- Garrison/HQ: Sheffield
- Patron: Lord Mayor and City of Sheffield
- March: Jock o' York
- Engagements: Battle of the Somme; Third Battle of the Scarpe; Capture of Oppy Wood

The Sheffield City Battalion was a 'Pals battalion' formed as part of 'Kitchener's Army' during World War I. Raised by local initiative in the City of Sheffield, it became the 12th (Service) Battalion of the local York and Lancaster Regiment ('12th Y&L'). After almost two years of training, it was virtually destroyed on the first day of the Battle of the Somme in a disastrous attack on the village of Serre. The battalion continued to serve on the Western Front, including the Arras offensive, but it was disbanded early in 1918.

== Recruitment ==
Alfred Leete's recruitment poster for Kitchener's Army.

On 6 August 1914, less than 48 hours after Britain's declaration of war, Parliament sanctioned an increase of 500,000 men for the Regular British Army, and the newly appointed Secretary of State for War, Earl Kitchener of Khartoum issued his famous call to arms: 'Your King and Country Need You', urging the first 100,000 volunteers to come forward to form the 1st New Army ('K1'). A flood of volunteers poured into the recruiting offices across the country and were formed into 'Service' battalions of the county regiments. However, these were soon joined by groups of men from particular localities or backgrounds who wished to serve together. Starting from Liverpool, Manchester and London, the phenomenon of 'Pals battalions' quickly spread across the country, as local recruiting committees offered complete units to the War Office. One such unit was raised by the Lord Mayor and City of Sheffield, following an initiative by the Duke of Norfolk, a former Lord Mayor of the city, and Sir George Franklin of the University of Sheffield. A meeting held on 1 September 1914 resolved to form the Sheffield University and City Special Battalion of the local York and Lancaster Regiment. The War Office accepted the proposal on 5 September, enrolment began at the Town Hall on 10 September and later at the Corn Exchange. Placards bearing the slogan 'To Berlin – via Corn Exchange' encouraged men to come forward. The first parade was held at Norfolk Barracks (the Sheffield Volunteer Artillery's Drill Hall on Clough Road) on 14 September, commanded by Colonel Herbert Hughes, former commanding officer (CO) of the volunteer Hallamshire Battalion of the York and Lancaster Regiment.

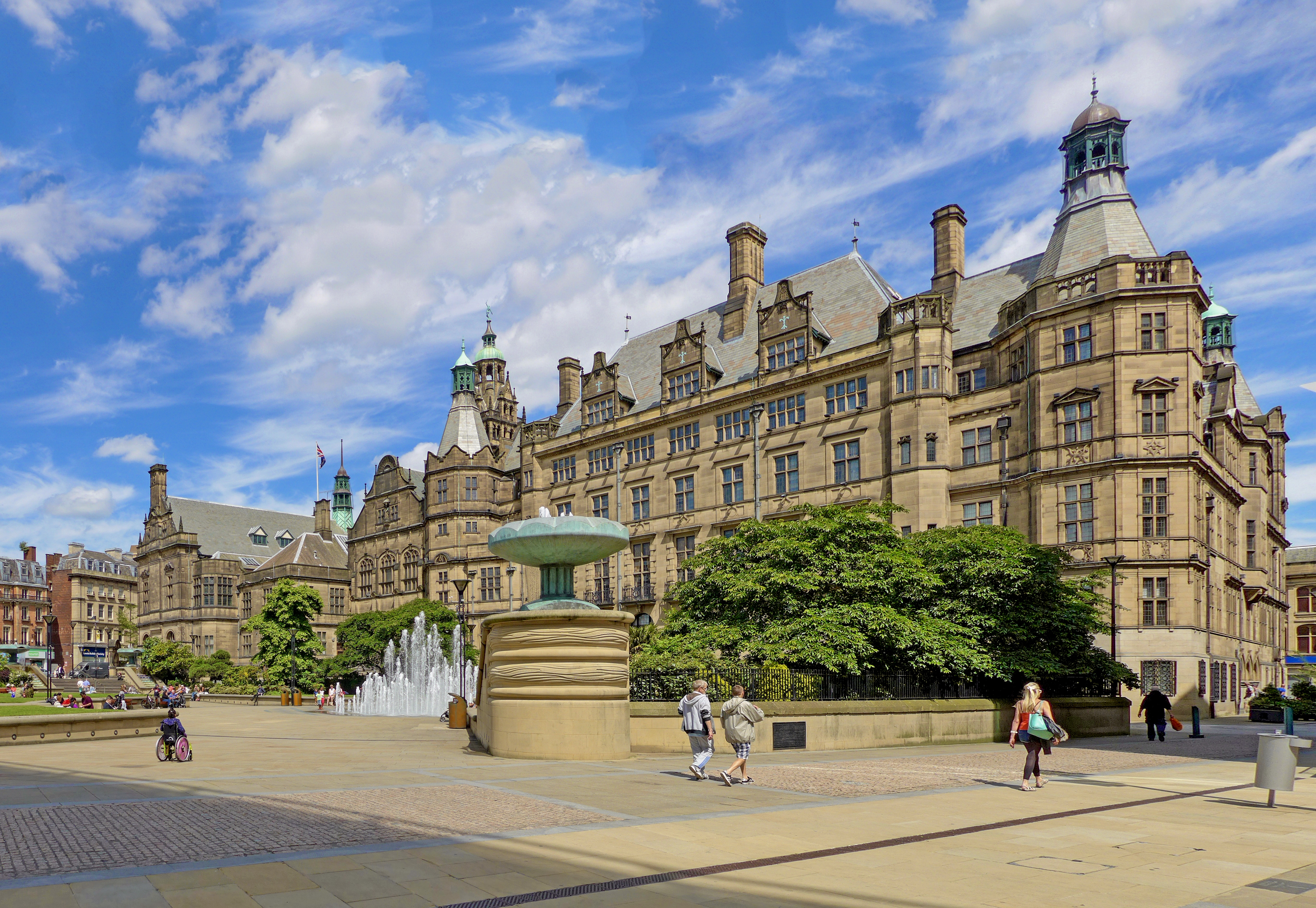
Sheffield Town Hall, where the Sheffield City Battalion was recruited.

At that parade, it was noted, were 'many men whom no other conceivable circumstances would have brought into the Army; £500 a year business men, stockbrokers, engineers, chemists, metallurgical experts, University and public school men, medical students, journalists, schoolmasters, craftsmen, shop assistants, secretaries, and all sorts of clerks'. The postwar music hall performer Stainless Stephen was a member.

== Training ==
The rush of Kitchener recruits had overwhelmed the Army's ability to absorb them, so the Pals Battalions (mainly in the Fifth New Army, 'K5') were left for some time in the hands of the recruiting committees. The men of the Sheffield City Battalion, soon to be officially the 12th (Service) Battalion, York and Lancaster Regiment (Sheffield), underwent their initial training at Bramall Lane cricket and football ground and in Norfolk Park. A number of retired Regular Army non-commissioned officers (NCOs) were taken on to drill the men. For nearly three months the men lived in their own homes or lodgings in Sheffield, and drilled in their civilian clothes until the recruiting committee obtained uniforms for them. With khaki cloth unobtainable, these were of dark blue-grey cloth, with a small field service cap with a red stripe. Vickers Limited supplied 23 rifles and loaned a machine gun, which allowed some instruction to take place. On 10 October Col C.V. Mainwaring of the Indian Army, was appointed the first permanent CO of the battalion. On 5 December the battalion went into huts erected by the City Architect at Redmires Camp, a former racecourse on the moors outside the city. At that point the battalion had reached its full establishment strength of 1131 men.

On 10 December the battalion was assigned to 115th Brigade of 38th Division, formed of Pals Battalions from across Northern England: 115th Bde consisted of the Grimsby Chums (10th (Service) Battalion, Lincolnshire Regiment), the Sheffield City Battalion, (12th(S) Bn, Y&L Regiment) and the 1st and 2nd Barnsley Pals (13th and 14th (S) Bns, Y&L Regiment). In April 1915 the Fourth New Army (K4) was converted into reserve units for K1–K3, and the K5 formations took over their numbers: thus 115th Bde became 94th Bde in 31st Division. Soon after it was renumbered, the new 94th Bde was concentrated in May at Penkridge Bank Camp on Cannock Chase, Staffordshire, where it was joined by the Accrington Pals (11th East Lancashire Regiment). in place of the Grimsby Chums. The other battalions were envious of the 12th's machine gun. and rifles supplied by Vickers, but it was only on 21 June that the battalion fully equipped with rifles. Even then, these were obsolete Magazine Lee–Metfords in bad condition; 80 modern Short Magazine Lee-Enfields (SMLEs) arrived for instruction on 17 June. The 31st Division concentrated at South Camp, Ripon, at the end of July 1915, then in September it moved to Hurdcott Camp where it carried out final intensive battle training on Salisbury Plain. Colonel Mainwaring was graded medically unfit for overseas service and gave up the command on 28 September, being replaced by Lieutenant-Colonel J.A. Crosthwaite from the Durham Light Infantry. The battalion finally received its full allocation of SMLE rifles at the end of November 1915.

=== 15th (Reserve) Battalion ===
Authorisation was received in early December 1914 for a fifth, reserve company (E Company), to be formed to provide reinforcements for the Sheffield City Battalion. Recruiting was carried out at Sheffield Town Hall in the third week of December and like the first volunteers the men were initially billeted in their own homes. Drills were carried out at Norfolk Park on fine days, or on wet days in a building in Hawley Street known as 'The Jungle', formerly a skating rink. E Company joined the battalion at Redmires Camp on 10 April and remained there when the battalion left for Cannock Chase, when authority was received for a second reserve company to be formed. On 9 June Northern Command ordered the depot companies of the regiments to be concentrated, so E and F Companies moved from Redmires to Silkstone outside Barnsley, to join those of the 1st and 2nd Barnsley Pals (13th and 14th Y&L). In July 1915 the depot companies of all three battalions were formed into 15th (Reserve) Battalion, York and Lancaster Regiment, through the battalions continued their own local recruiting. At the end of the year the 12th Bn took over Hyde Park Barracks (the Hallamshire Battalion's Drill Hall in St John's Road) as its recruiting depot until April 1916.

== Service ==
=== Egypt ===
On 29 November 1915, 31st Division received warning orders to join the British Expeditionary Force in France, and advance parties set out for the embarkation ports of Folkestone and Southampton. At the last minute, the destination was changed to Egypt, the advance parties were recalled, and on 7 December the troops embarked at Devonport, 12th Y&L aboard HM Transport Nestor of the Blue Funnel Line. The Nestor reached Alexandria on 1 January 1916 and the battalion then entrained for Port Said where 31st Division concentrated by 23 January. It took over No 3 Section of the Suez Canal defences at Qantara and El Ferdan, where the men underwent training as well as providing working parties for the defences. On 26 February orders arrived to reverse the process and the division began re-embarking at Port Said, 12th Y&L aboard HMT Briton on 10 March. It unloaded at Marseille on 15 March and then joined the division concentrating in the Somme area. It remained on the Western Front for the rest of the war.

31st Division was part of the BEF's concentration of troops in the Somme sector preparing for that summer's 'Big Push', the Battle of the Somme. On 27 March the battalion arrived at Vignacourt, from where a party of officers and NCOs went into the line for instruction on Trench warfare by 8th Bn Worcestershire Regiment. From 29 March the battalion was accommodated in canvas huts at Bertrancourt. It then spent four periods in April–June holding the line in front of Colincamps, suffering its first battle casualties from enemy shellfire and trench raids. Out of the line it provided working parties to repair damaged trenches and to dig new assembly and communication trenches for the forthcoming offensive. On 5 June the battalion moved to Gézaincourt for a week's training, including a practice assault by the whole brigade over a mock up of the German trenches.

=== First day of the Somme ===
Despite all the preparation and high hopes, the First day on the Somme (1 July) was a disaster for 31st Division. Its task was to take the village of Serre and form a defensive flank for the rest of Fourth Army. 94th Brigade moved into its assembly trenches in a line of copses (named 'Matthew', 'Mark', 'Luke' and 'John') in front of Colincamps on 30 June. Just beforehand, Lt-Col Crosthwaite was evacuated to hospital and Major A. Plackett was hurriedly recalled from commanding the divisional school to take command of 12th Y&L for next day's attack. 94th Brigade on the division's left was to attack on a two-battalion front with the 12th Y&L (left) and 11th East Lancs (right) leading, followed by a company of the divisional pioneer battalion, the 12th King's Own Yorkshire Light Infantry. The leading waves left their trenches at 07.20 when the nearby Hawthorn Ridge mine was exploded, 10 minutes before Zero. They then laid down in no man's land about 100 yards (91 m) in front of the trenches while the final intensive bombardment of the enemy positions was fired. The second wave moved out at 07.29 and lay down about 30 yards (27 m) further back. Thus alerted, the enemy put down their own heavy artillery barrage on the British line and their machine gun teams came out of their dugouts. When the two leading waves set off at 07.30, followed by the third and fourth emerging from the trenches, they were almost annihilated by German fire. The 12th Y&L was hit in its left flank from German trenches that were not being attacked, and which had not been adequately screened by a planned smokescreen. The left half of C Company was shot down before reaching the German barbed wire, and only a few of the right half and of A Company were able to get through the wire into the German frontline trench; most were soon killed or driven out.

Private A. Fretwell reported that 'When I got near the German trenches I could see some of them coming out with their hands up, but when they saw how many of us had been hit, they changed their minds and ran back again'.

The survivors from all four companies took what shelter they could in shellholes in no man's land. It was reported that some men of 12th Y&L may have reached Serre: if this was the case nothing was ever heard from them again, but later in the war bodies of men from the battalion were recovered from this area.

Corporal Outram, a signaller, recalled that 'as far as the eye could see, the last two men left standing on the battlefield were himself and another signaller, A. Brammer. They signalled to each other. Outram turned his head for a moment, and when he looked back Brammer had gone.'

The 14th Y&L were to advance behind the 12th Y&L, establishing a trench line to join the captured German trenches with their own jumping off trenches. They too suffered heavy casualties in no man's land. With heavy shellfire falling on the chaotic jumping-off trenches, the attack was suspended. By noon the sector was quiet apart from occasional shelling and sniping at the men pinned down in no man's land. Although a fresh attack was ordered for the afternoon, the divisional commander and the commanders of 93rd and 94th Bdes concluded that neither brigade was fit for any further offensive operation. Those men in no man's land who were able slipped back after dark; for a time next day, the Germans allowed stretcher-bearers to remove casualties from no man's land. The Sheffield City Battalion had lost 8 officers killed and 9 wounded (only four officers survived unscathed, including the adjutant and the medical officer). Among the other ranks (ORs), 45 were killed and 201 missing, later reported killed; 249 were wounded, of whom 12 later died, and 2 were prisoners of war. There were another 75 men who were only slightly wounded.

=== Neuve Chappelle ===
The shattered 31st Division was pulled out and sent to the quiet Neuve-Chapelle sector for rest and refit. Lieutenant-Col H.B. Fisher was promoted from Brigade major of 92nd Brigade to command the battalion, and Maj C.H. Gurney was transferred from 13th Y&L as second-in-command. On 10 September the battalion carried out a successful trench raid on the enemy positions. On 16 September the division moved into the Festubert sector, with 12th Y&R taking over a group of interconnected positions known as 'The Islands'. Here Lt-Col Fisher was killed by a German sniper on 3 October while visiting the Island posts. He was succeeded on 12 October by Lt-Col C.P. Riall of the East Yorkshire Regiment, who had been temporary second-in-command of 13th Y&L, and Maj Gurney left for the Senior Officers' School in the UK, later to command a battalion of the East Yorkshires.. Meanwhile, the battalion had been reinforced by drafts of 'Derby men', 100 from Northamptonshire on 2 October, 94 intended for the 1/6th Bn North Staffordshire Regiment on 15 October, 48 from South Lancashire on 17 October and 50 from the South of England on 23 October. Although the battalion was strengthened, the 'Sheffield Pals' element was diluted.

=== Ancre ===
The Somme Offensive was still continuing when 31st Division returned to the sector on 18 October. The battalion provided working parties until 27 October and then took over the Hébuterne sector of the line 31 October. The roads and communication trenches here were waterlogged in winter, and some of them could only be kept open by continuous labour. Even when out of the line at Sailly, the battalion came under fire from gas shells. For the Battle of the Ancre, which was to be the last big operation of the year, 31st Division made another attempt to capture Serre on 13 November, but 94th Bde was still not fit for active operations and although standing by it was not employed except to provide carrying parties and to rescue the wounded. The battalions continued to hold the trenches in front of Serre during the winter, carrying out occasional raids. Between October 1916 and April 1917 12th Y&L had 887 men evacuated to hospital, many suffering from Trench foot, of whom more than half rejoined later. In the same period the battalion received 764 men as drafts. It was temporarily commanded from 5 December to 11 January by Maj F.J. Courtenay Hood from the 14th Y&L. The division was rested from 12 January to 7 February 1917, and the troops underwent training.

In late February 1917 the Germans began a withdrawal to the Hindenburg Line (Operation Alberich). They disappeared from the Ancre Front on 24 February and 31st Division was ordered to send out strong patrols next day to regain touch with them. Next day patrols entered Serre, and over following days the division's advanced guards continued forwards, skirmishing with German rearguards and dealing with booby-traps. 12th Y&L was called forward from billets in Courcelles on the evening of 1 March and worked its way over the old Somme battlefield, reaching Puisieux on 9 March and remained patrolling in the devastated zone until 12 March, when 31st Division was squeezed out as British units converged on the shorter Hindenburg Line. It was then held in. readiness for an operation but was not called upon, and on 19 March the division began a six-day march to join First Army north of Arras.

=== Arras ===
From 25 March to 8 April 12 Y&L trained around Merville, particularly in open warfare, and received a draft of 100 men while sending four officers and 50 ORs to XIII Corps' Reinforcement Camp to help train fresh drafts from the UK. On 9 April First Army captured Vimy Ridge, and next day 31st Division moved up in case it was required for exploitation as the Arras Offensive developed. However it was not brought into the line until 1 May, 12th Y&L coming under the command of 93rd Bde. The division then attacked on 3 May (the Third Battle of the Scarpe) with 92nd and 93rd Bdes in line, 12th Y&L in support of 93rd. The assault was launched under a setting moon, which silhouetted the attackers to the enemy, and towards the darkness of Oppy Wood, in which the men could not see when their barrage lifted. Nevertheless, 93rd Bde made good progress at first, some companies reaching the final objective. 92nd Brigade, however, facing the main mass of the wood, failed, thereby leaving 93rd Bde's left flank exposed. A and C Companies of 12th Y&L were called forward at 06.10 in case of a counter-attack by the enemy, and the rest of the battalion followed them to Hill 80 an hour later. Information on the situation ahead was obscure, and at different times Lt-Col Riall was ordered to aid all four of 93rd Bde's battalions; the most alarming report came from the left flank of the brigade. However, each of these orders was cancelled, and in the end the battalion took up a reserve position. On 4 May it reverted to its old positions under 94th Bde once more. From 9 to 14 May and again from 18 to 20 May the battalion defended the key position of Gavrelle Windmill under heavy artillery fire. At first its positions were in shellholes, but these were gradually linked by trenches. The rear trenches were almost obliterated by the enemy artillery, and the defenders were frequently attacked by German aircraft. The task of getting supplies, particularly water, to the front line involved a great deal of dangerous work. The battalion's casualties in this period were 10 officers and 168 ORs, including Lt-Col Riall who had to be evacuated to hospital on 18 May. The second-in-command, Maj D.C. Allen, took over until 1 June when Maj Courtenay Hood returned from temporary command of 13th Y&L to be promoted to permanent command of 12th Y&L.

=== Oppy Wood ===
Oppy Wood, 1917. Evening, by John Nash.

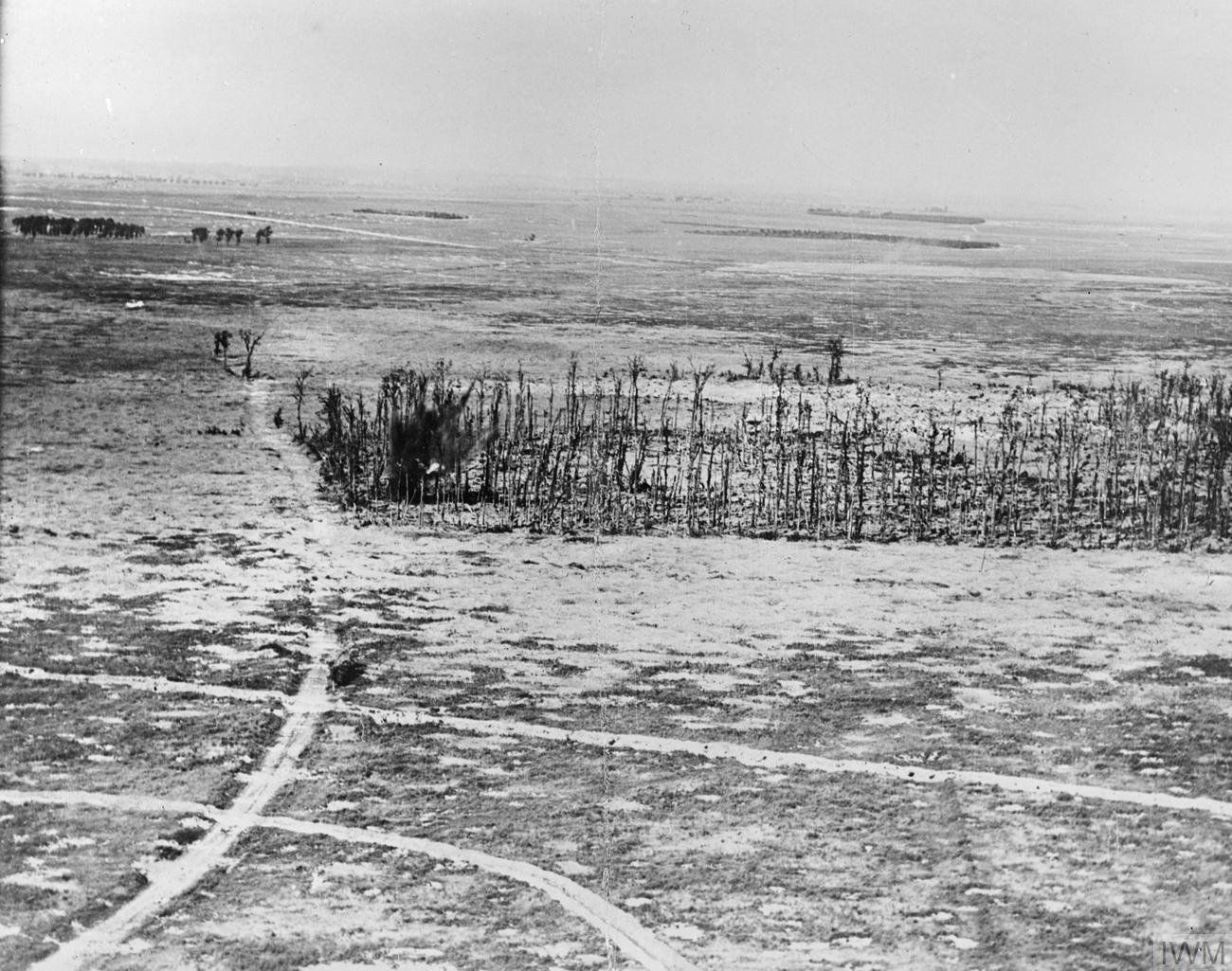
Oppy Wood, from the air.

31st Division remained in the area after the Arras offensive ended. Late in June First Army began a series of feint attacks to draw attention away from the Ypres Salient where the BEF was planning a new offensive. First Army gave the impression of preparing for large-scale attacks on Hill 70 and Oppy. In fact the attack on Oppy and Gavrelle, carried out by 94th Bde and 15th Bde of 5th Division on 28 June was in the nature of a carefully-planned large-scale raid, though with the intention of retaining the limited objectives set for it. As a feint it was important that the enemy should be expecting the attack, and they bombarded the packed jumping-off trenches at 17.30. Despite the 200 casualties they had suffered, the two brigades waited until the British barrage came down suddenly at Zero (19.10) then advanced so quickly across No man's land that the German defensive barrage fell behind them. The British covering artillery was so powerful that the assaulting troops met little resistance, taking Gavrelle Mill and Oppy Wood with very few casualties. Once it went 'over the top', the 12th Y&L suffered no casualties, and took its objective – Cadorna Trench – together with 50 prisoners, and immediately consolidated it for defence while the Germans fell back almost 1 mile (1.6 km), expecting a deeper penetration. Lieutenant-Col Courtenay Hood was later awarded the Distinguished Service Order (DSO) for his part in the Capture of Oppy Wood, and the York and Lancasters were later granted the Battle honour 'Oppy' for the work of the 12th, 13th and 14th battalions.

Afterwards, 31st Division went to rest, with 12th Y&L being stationed at Bray, near Écoivres, north of Arras, behind Vimy Ridge. Manpower shortages were now becoming apparent, and the battalion was informed that its strength would not exceed 700 in future. As a result, it was reorganised from four to only three fighting companies, with Battalion Headquarters organised as a separate company. When Canadian Corps moved away, XIII Corps took over defence of the ridge, and 12th Y&R spent the rest of its career taking turns defending this sector, constantly working to improve the defences when it was out of the line. The battalion lost heavily to two German Mustard gas bombardments, the first on the night of 5/6 August, which caused 120 casualties, the other on 30 September/1 October, with 109 casualties. Many of the latter were suffered by a raiding party training to carry out an operation. The raid was reorganised, but when it was launched on 5/6 October it failed when a Bangalore torpedo failed to explode and the wire could not be broken. In December the battalion was under orders to move to join the Battle of Cambrai, but the fighting there died down and the order was cancelled.

== Disbandment ==
By the beginning of 1918 the BEF was suffering a manpower crisis. Brigades were reduced from four to three battalions each, and the remainder were broken up to provide reinforcements for the others. In fact, in 31st Division 94th Bde was broken up entirely. As one of the weakest battalions, the 12th Y&R was selected for disbandment, and this was carried out between 11 and 17 February. Fifteen officers and 300 ORs joined the 13th Y&L (which also absorbed the 14th Y&L, and transferred to 93rd Bde), a further 13 officers and 280 ORs went to the 7th Y&R (the pioneer battalion of 17th (Northern) Division), some went to the Grenadier Guards (in 4th (Guards) Brigade, which replaced 94th Bde in 31st Division) and the remainder were posted to No 4 Entrenching Battalion. The battalion band transferred in its entirety to the 2/4th Y&R (the 2nd Hallamshire Bn in 62nd (2nd West Riding) Division). Many of these men became casualties a few weeks later during the German spring offensive. The battalion's commanding officer, Lt-Col Courtenay Hood, commanded 7th (Reserve) Bn, King's (Liverpool Regiment), in the UK for six months, then returned to France in late September 1918 as CO of 1/5th Bn King's Own Scottish Borderers in the final weeks of the war, when he was also a temporary brigade commander.

== Commanders ==
The following served as commanding officer of 12th York & Lancasters:

- Col Herbert Hughes, CB, CMG, (retired) acting from first raising
- Col C.V. Mainwaring (Indian Army), from 10 October 1914
- Lt-Col J.A. Crosthwaite (Durham Light Infantry) from 28 September 1915
- Maj A. Plackett, acting from 30 June, wounded 1 July 1916
- Capt N.L. Tunbridge, acting 1–4 July
- Capt, later Maj D.C. Allen, acting from 4 July 1916 and 18 May–1 June 1917
- Lt-Col H.B. Fisher (Wiltshire Regiment), from summer 1916, killed 3 October 1916
- Maj C.H. Gurney, acting 3–12 October 1916
- Lt-Col C.P. Riall (East Yorkshire Regiment), from 12 October 1916; sick 18 May 1917
- Maj, later Lt-Col F.J. Courtenay Hood, DSO, (Buffs (Royal East Kent Regiment)) acting 5 December 1916 to 11 January 1917; 1 June 1917 to disbandment

== Insignia ==
The first pattern of 31st Division's formation sign.

As well as the Y&L cap badge, with the Bengal tiger (for the original 65th Foot) surmounted by a Tudor rose (for both counties) and ducal coronet (for the Duchy of Lancaster), the battalion wore a unique brass title with 'Y.&L.' above a curved 'SHEFFIELD' on the shoulder straps. All ranks wore the cap badge stencilled on the front of their steel helmets. They also wore the 94th Brigade cloth sign of a square divided red-over-white, worn on the back beneath the collar, with a circle underneath (or possibly on each arm), which was green for 12th Bn. Specialists wore a coloured band on the left forearm and shoulder straps: snipers green, signallers blue and runners red. On 1 July 1916 each man wore an inverted tin triangle on the haversack on their back.

The original formation sign of 31st Division was a design with triangles and vertical lines (see picture). This was replaced in 1917 with overlapping York (white) and Lancaster (red) roses on right and left respectively; Yorkshire-based regiments such as the Y&L wore this with the white overlapping the red.

== Legacy ==
=== Memorials ===
The villages of Serre and Puisieux were adopted by the city of Sheffield after the war, and there is a memorial to the Sheffield City Battalion in Serre. Sheffield Memorial Park comprises the woodland of the 'Mark', 'Luke' and 'John' copses from which the 94th Bde 'jumped off' on 1 July 1916. First opened in 1936, it retains outlines of trenches and shellholes and includes a number of memorials, including a brick-built shelter dedicated to the fallen of the Sheffield City Battalion.

Surviving members of the City Battalion erected a memorial plaque to their fallen comrades in Sheffield Cathedral. Made from local Hopton Wood stone and Blue John fluorspar, it carries the bronze badge of the York & Lancaster Regiment and the coat of arms of Sheffield. It was unveiled by Col C.V. Mainwaring on 20 December 1919.

The York & Lancaster Regiment War Memorial is in Weston Park, Sheffield. It consists of a stone obelisk surmounted by a bronze winged figure of Victory and flanked by bronze figures of an officer and a private. It was unveiled on 7 July 1923 by the regimental colonel, Field Marshal Viscount Plumer.

=== War poets ===
Two published war poets served in the ranks of the Sheffield City Battalion and were killed on 1 July 1916:

- Corporal Alexander Robertson (12 January 1881 – 1 July 1916) of A Company was a history lecturer at Sheffield University. Three of his poems appeared in Soldier Poets published in 1916, a collection was published as Comrades later that year, and Last Poems of Alexander Robertson in 1918. Posted as missing on 1 July 1916, his body was never identified, and he is commemorated on the Thiepval Memorial to the Missing of the Somme.
- Sergeant John William 'Will' Streets (24 March 1886 – 1 July 1916) was a miner at Whitwell Colliery. Six of his poems appeared in Soldier Poets and a collection called The Undying Splendour was published in 1917. He was wounded on 1 July 1916 and was last seen going into No man's land to rescue a badly wounded man of his platoon. Posted as missing, his body was discovered on 1 May 1917 and he is buried in Euston Road Cemetery, Colincamps.

=== In fiction ===
The writer John Harris, himself a former reporter on the Sheffield Daily Telegraph, based the 'City Battalion' of the 'Two Counties Regiment' in his 1961 novel Covenant with Death largely on the Sheffield City Battalion. The story focuses on a group of newspaper reporters who join up in 1914 and takes them to the destruction of the battalion on 1 July 1916. It quotes from Sparling's History of the battalion.
