= Lodge Moor camp =

British military camp in Sheffield

Coordinates: 53.3706°N 1.5800°W

Lodge Moor was a British military camp based near Redmires Reservoirs, Sheffield, that was best known for housing prisoners of war during World War II. It held approximately 11,000 at its peak, mostly Germans. It was established in World War I for training purposes.

== History ==
=== World War I ===
In World War I, Redmires Camp was set up in the area around Redmires Reservoir as a training camp for the Sheffield City Battalion. Archaeological surveys of nearby training areas, including trench systems dug by the trainee soldiers, were undertaken between 1999 and 2006, but no investigations were made of the camp. When the Sheffield City Battalion went overseas, the camp area was used by other British military units. It subsequently became a prisoner of war camp, with its most famous inmate being the future Admiral Karl Dönitz who had been commanding a U-boat when he was captured on 4 October 1918.

=== Inter-war Period ===
In 1925, a severe outbreak of smallpox meant that nearby Lodge Moor Hospital was unable to house all the patients, and Redmires Camp was used as an auxiliary hospital. It remained in use as such until 1935.

=== World War II ===
At the beginning of World War II the name of Redmires Camp was changed to Lodge Moor Camp, becoming Prisoner of War Camp 17. The camp housed Italian POWs who established a friendly rapport with the locals. As the war progressed they were replaced by German prisoners who endured overcrowding; the International Committee of the Red Cross described the conditions as "insufficient/uninhabitable". A witness suggested there were more than 70 prisoners in huts designed for 30. Others were in tents.

The camp in 1948, from Historic England website:-

==== Murder ====
On 24 March 1945, Gerhardt Rettig, a German prisoner of war, was severely beaten by fellow German prisoners of war, and later died of his injuries in hospital. Two men were subsequently tried for his murder and executed.

=== Current condition and uses ===
Many of the concrete bases for the Nissen huts remain, along with remains of toilet blocks and emergency water storage tanks. However, apart from the concrete bases, the area is now overgrown with trees, bracken and brambles, and used mainly by dog walkers. It is signposted as Redmires Camp Plantation and owned by Sheffield City Council.

In 1979, a small part of the area was cleared to make a permanent site for Travellers, for which it is still in use.

Archaeology students from the University of Sheffield, working with the Sheffield Lakeland Landscape Partnership (SLLP), undertook new searches of the World War II camp remains in the Summer of 2019. In April 2021, visitors to the site reported that Sheffield City Council workers, clearing trees from the site, had damaged concrete bases of the prisoners' accommodation, broke one of the toilet blocks, and crushed the remains of sewage pipes. The site is protected as a Scheduled Monument.
