= Reginald Brabazon, 13th Earl of Meath =

Anglo-Irish landowner and British Army Brigadier-General

Brigadier-General The Right Honourable The Earl of Meath CBE DL
- Born: The Hon Reginald Le Normand Brabazon; 24 November 1869
- Died: 10 March 1949 (aged 79) Killruddery House, Bray, County Wicklow, Ireland

Brigadier-General Reginald Le Normand Brabazon, 13th Earl of Meath, CBE, DL (24 November 1869 – 10 March 1949), known as Lord Ardee from 1887 to 1929, was an Anglo-Irish soldier.

Brabazon was the eldest son of Reginald Brabazon, 12th Earl of Meath, and Lady Mary Jane Maitland. He married Lady Aileen May Wyndham-Quin, daughter of Wyndham Thomas Wyndham-Quin, 4th Earl of Dunraven, and Florence Elizabeth Kerr, on 12 February 1908 at the Guards Chapel, Wellington Barracks.

Educated at Wellington College, he was commissioned into the Grenadier Guards in 1889. He served in the Second Boer War from 1899–1902 and was decorated with the Queen's Medal, three clasps, and the King's Medal, two clasps. It was during this period that he conceived his version of a water clock.

He served again in the First World War, and was gassed in 1918 while commanding the 4th Guards Brigade. At the conclusion of his service, he had attained the rank of brigadier-general.

His other vocation was gardening, and indeed the gardens at Killruddery House, the Meath family estate, now figure more highly in tourist books than the house itself.

He was made a CBE in 1919 and died on 10 March 1949 aged 79 at Killruddery.

Honorary titles
Preceded by The Lord HolmPatrick	Lord Lieutenant of Dublin; 1898–1922	Office abolished
Peerage of Ireland
Preceded by Reginald Brabazon	Earl of Meath; 1929–1949	Succeeded by Anthony Windham Norman Brabazon
