= Serre-lès-Puisieux =

- village
- Location of Serre-lès-Puisieux in Grand Est Serre-lès-Puisieux (France)
- Coordinates: 50°06′12″N 2°40′09″E
- Country: France
- Region: Hauts-de-France
- Department: Pas-de-Calais
- Commune: Puisieux

Serre-lès-Puisieux is a village in the commune of Puisieux in the Pas-de-Calais department in Hauts-de-France in northern France.

== Geography ==
Serre-lès-Puisieux is situated on the D919 road, 38 kilometres (24 mi) northeast of Amiens, 14 kilometres (9 mi) north of Albert and 25 kilometres (16 mi) southwest of Arras. Colincamps lies to the west, Hébuterne to the northwest, Puisieux to the northeast and Beaumont-Hamel to the south.

== History ==
During the first two and a half years of the First World War, Serre-lès-Puisieux was held by the Germans and marked the northern point of the allied attack on the first day of the Battle of the Somme. The front line near the village remained more or less unchanged up until the end of the battle in November 1916. The Germans evacuated the village as part of their withdrawal in February 1917, but was lost by the Allies during the German spring offensive on 25 March 1918. The Allies retook the village on 14 August 1918, during the Hundred Days Offensive.

== Cemeteries ==
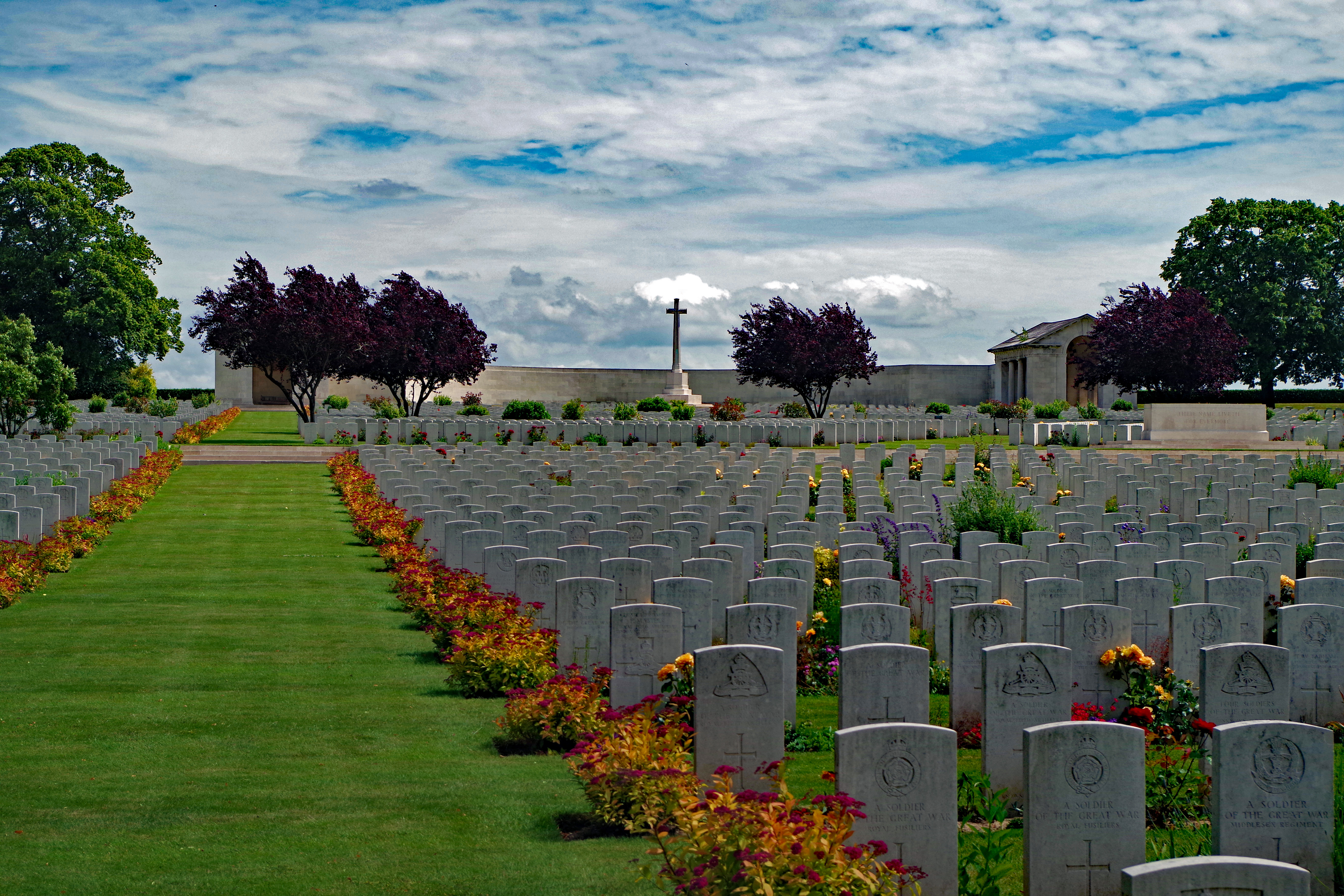
Serre Road Cemetery No. 2.

- Luke Copse British Cemetery
- Nécropole nationale de Serre-Hébuterne
- Queens Cemetery
- Serre Road Cemetery No. 1, 2 & 3
- Sheffield Memorial Park
- Ten Tree Alley Cemetery

Nearby cemeteries are:

- Munich Trench Cemetery
- Redan Ridge Cemetery No. 1, 2 & 3

== See also ==
- First day on the Somme – Serre
- Sheffield City Battalion
