= Puisieux, Pas-de-Calais =

Puisieux
- Commune
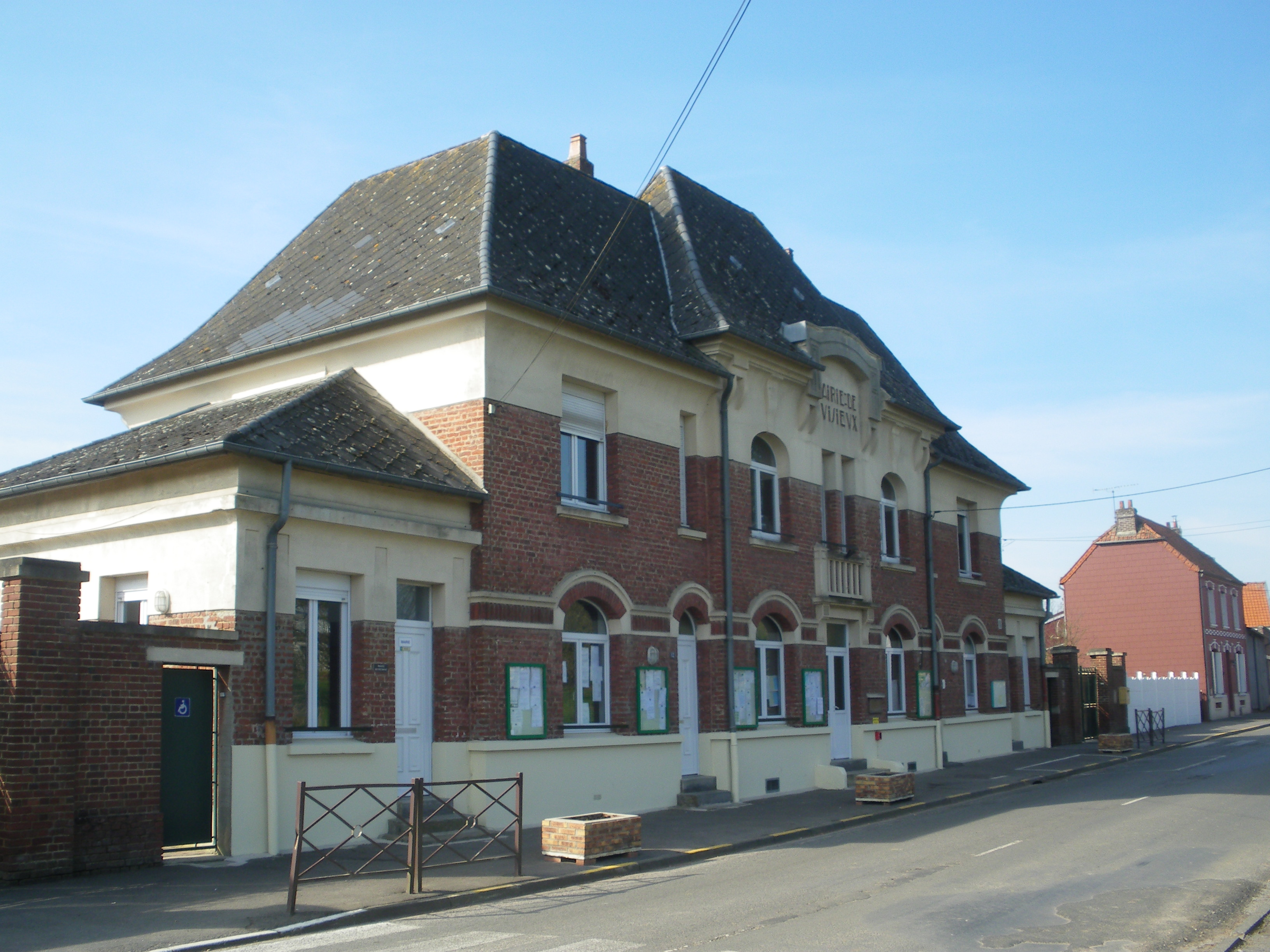
- The town hall of Puisieux

- Coat of arms
- Location of Puisieux
- Location within France Location within Hauts-de-France
- Coordinates: 50°07′00″N 2°41′44″E
- Country: France
- Region: Hauts-de-France
- Department: Pas-de-Calais
- Arrondissement: Arras
- Canton: Avesnes-le-Comte
- Intercommunality: CC Sud-Artois

Government
  - Mayor (2020–2026): Jacques Bonnay
- Area^{1}: 11.69 km^{2} (4.51 sq mi)
- Elevation: 128 m (420 ft)
- Highest elevation: 147 m (482 ft)
- Lowest elevation: 77 m (253 ft)
- Population (2023): 675
  - Density: 57.7/km^{2} (150/sq mi)
- Time zone: UTC+01:00 (CET)
  - Summer (DST): UTC+02:00 (CEST)
- INSEE/Postal code: 62672 /62116
- ^{1} French Land Register data, which excludes lakes, ponds, glaciers > 1 km^{2} (0.386 sq mi or 247 acres) and river estuaries.

Puisieux (French pronunciation: [pɥizjø]) or Puisieux-au-Mont is a commune in the Pas-de-Calais department in the Hauts-de-France region of France.

== Geography ==
Puisieux is situated 14 miles (23 km) south of Arras, at the junction of the D919, D27 and D6 roads.

== Population ==
Historical population
Year	Pop.	±% p.a.
1968	629	—
1975	599	−0.70%
1982	658	+1.35%
1990	613	−0.88%
1999	609	−0.07%
2007	628	+0.38%
2012	696	+2.08%
2017	661	−1.03%
2023	675	+0.35%
Source: INSEE

== Places of interest ==
- Queens Cemetery

== See also ==
- Communes of the Pas-de-Calais department
