= Colincamps =

- Commune
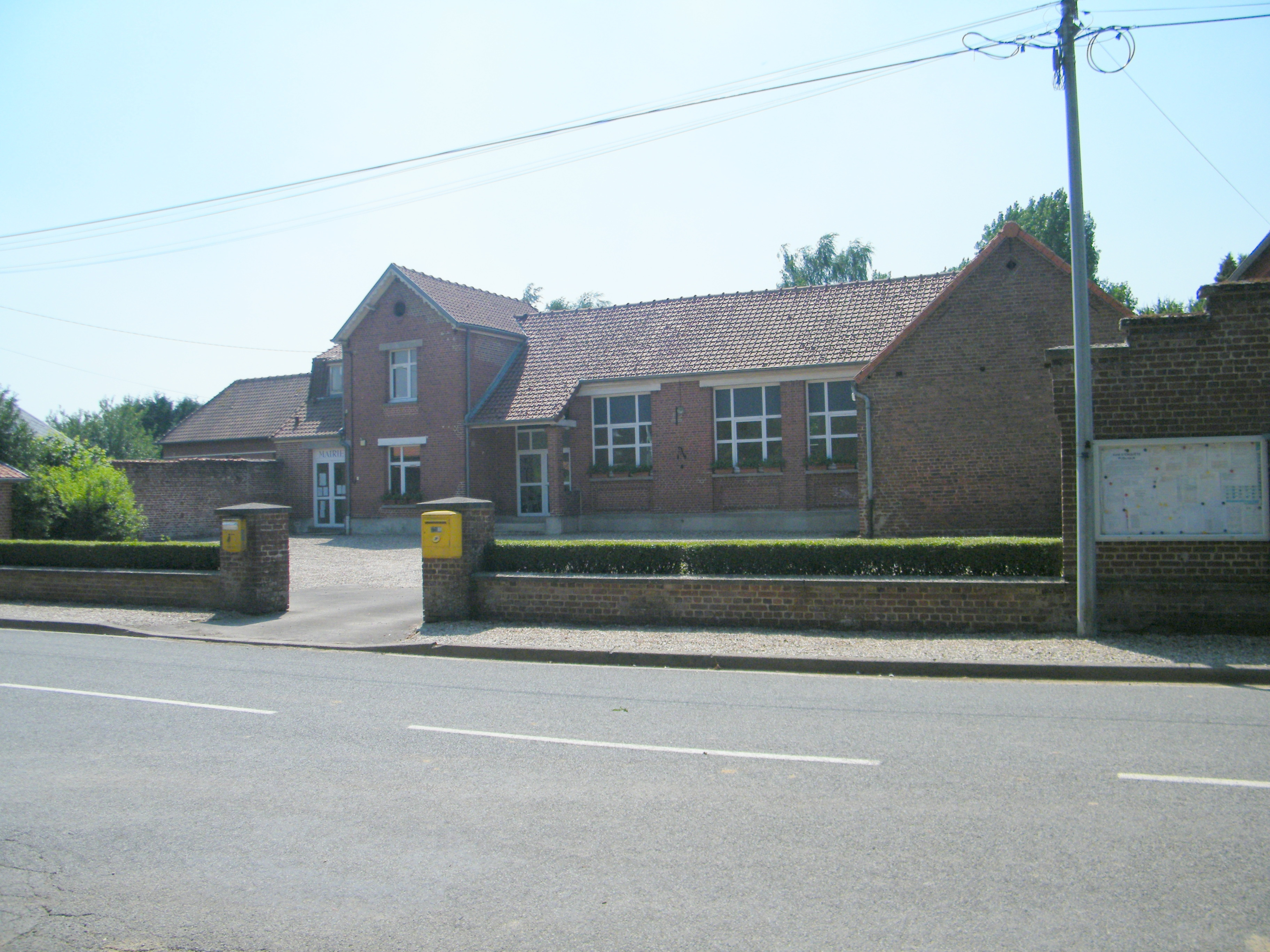
- The town hall and school in Colincamps
- Location of Colincamps
- Location within France Location within Hauts-de-France
- Coordinates: 50°06′04″N 2°36′03″E
- Country: France
- Region: Hauts-de-France
- Department: Somme
- Arrondissement: Péronne
- Canton: Albert
- Intercommunality: Pays du Coquelicot

Government
  - Mayor (2023–2026): Maxence De Bretagne
- Area^{1}: 4.38 km^{2} (1.69 sq mi)
- Elevation: 160 m (520 ft)
- Highest elevation: 157 m (515 ft)
- Lowest elevation: 134 m (440 ft)
- Population (2023): 80
  - Density: 18/km^{2} (47/sq mi)
- Time zone: UTC+01:00 (CET)
  - Summer (DST): UTC+02:00 (CEST)
- INSEE/Postal code: 80203 /80560
- ^{1} French Land Register data, which excludes lakes, ponds, glaciers > 1 km^{2} (0.386 sq mi or 247 acres) and river estuaries.

Colincamps (French pronunciation: [kɔlɛ̃kɑ̃]; Picard: Colincamp) is a commune in the Somme department in Hauts-de-France in northern France.

== Geography ==
Colincamps is situated on the D129 and D4129 crossroads, some 30 miles (48 km) northeast of Amiens.

== Population ==
Historical population
Year	Pop.	±% p.a.
1968	130	—
1975	116	−1.61%
1982	106	−1.28%
1990	104	−0.24%
1999	88	−1.84%
2007	91	+0.42%
2012	85	−1.35%
2017	88	+0.70%
2023	80	−1.58%
Source: INSEE

== See also ==
- Communes of the Somme department
