= Geoffrey Feilding =

British Army general

Major General Sir Geoffrey Feilding KCB KCVO CMG DSO
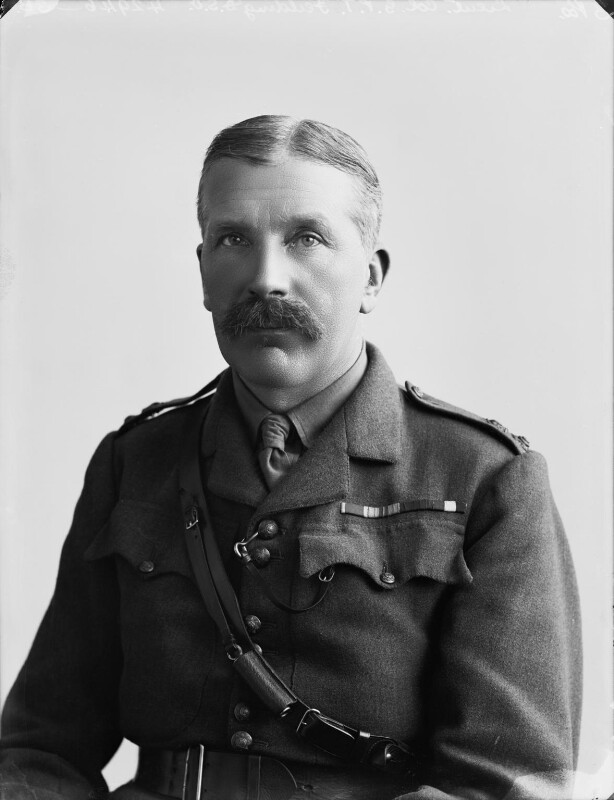
- Feilding in 1914
- Born: 21 September 1866; London, England
- Died: 21 October 1932 (aged 66)
- Military career
- Allegiance: United Kingdom
- Branch: British Army
- Service years: 1888–1927
- Rank: Major General
- Unit: Coldstream Guards
- Commands: 56th (1st London) Division; London District; Guards Division; 1st Guards Brigade; 149th (Northumberland) Brigade; 3rd Battalion, Coldstream Guards
- Conflicts: Second Boer War; First World War
- Awards: Knight Commander of the Order of the Bath; Knight Commander of the Royal Victorian Order; Companion of the Order of St Michael and St George; Distinguished Service Order; Mentioned in Despatches (9)

Major General Sir Geoffrey Percy Thynne Feilding, KCB, KCVO, CMG, DSO (21 September 1866 – 21 October 1932) was a senior British Army officer who is most notable for being the commander of the Guards Division on the Western Front during the First World War, commanding it from 1916 to 1918.

== Early life ==
Born on 21 September 1866 in South Kensington, London, Feilding was the son of Hon. Sir Percy Feilding (son of the 7th Earl of Denbigh), who fought with the Coldstream Guards during the Crimean War, and his wife Lady Louisa Isabella Harriet Thynne, eldest daughter of the 3rd Marquess of Bath. He was educated at Wellington College, Berkshire.

== Early military career ==
Feilding was commissioned into the Coldstream Guards, after graduating from the Royal Military College, Sandhurst, on 25 April 1888, promoted to lieutenant on 27 November 1890, and again to lieutenant from supernumerary lieutenant in August 1895, and lastly to captain, on augmentation, on 6 April 1898. He had been seconded for service on the staff in July 1893 and was appointed an extra aide-de-camp to Robert Duff.

He served in the early part of the Second Boer War from 1899 to 1900 and was present in the engagements at Belmont in November 1899, being mentioned in dispatches twice, and received the Distinguished Service Order (DSO). In February 1901 he was made an aide-de-camp to Major General M. W. Willson. He returned to South Africa in 1902, commanding a battalion of mounted infantry, and was granted the local rank of major on 20 April 1902.

Following the end of the war in June 1902, he returned to the United Kingdom on board the SS Ortona, which arrived in Southampton in September that year.

He was promoted from supernumary captain to captain in March 1903 and again to major in November 1903 and in June 1908 became commandant of the Guards Depot at Caterham, Surrey.

In September 1912 he was promoted to lieutenant colonel and became commanding officer of the 3rd Battalion, Coldstream Guards.

== First World War ==
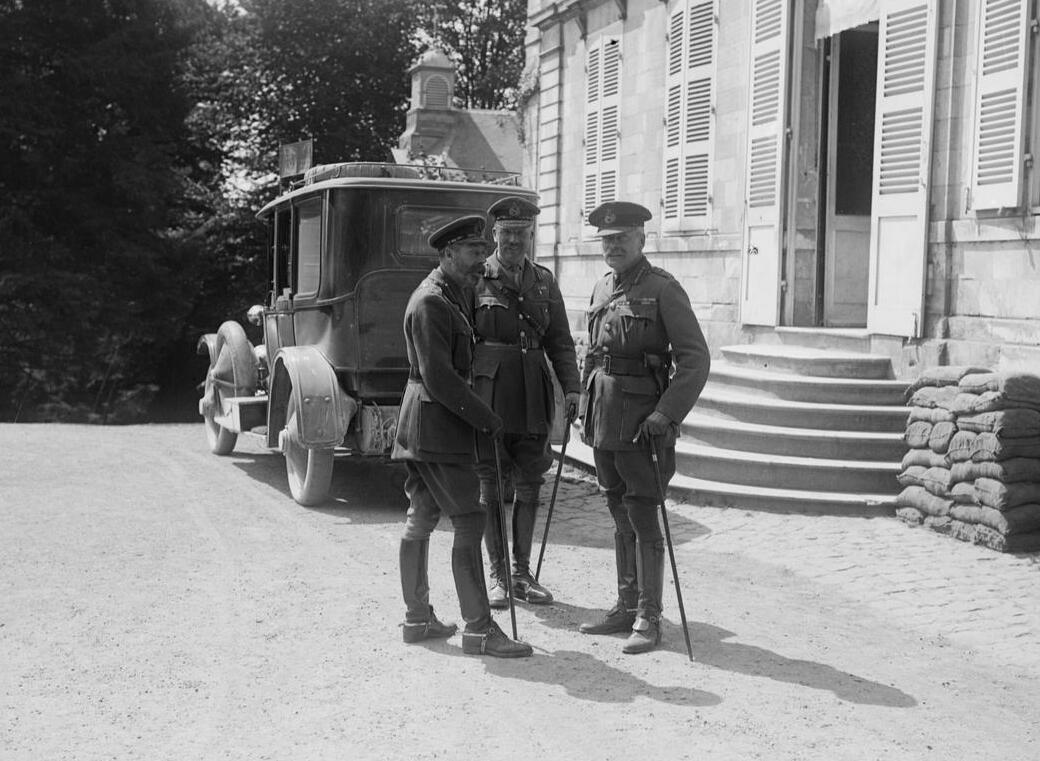
King George V with General Sir Douglas Haig, C-in-C British Expeditionary Force, and Major General Feilding, GOC Guards Division, at Beauquesne, France, 12 August 1916.

Fielding later served in the First World War, being mentioned in despatches seven times.

He was still the battalion's CO almost two years later, after the British entry into World War I, and led it in the opening stages of the war. After being promoted to brevet colonel in February 1915, and the temporary rank of brigadier general in late April, he went on to succeed Brigadier General James Foster Riddell as commander of the 149th (Northumberland) Brigade, part of the 50th (Northumbrian) Division, after Riddell was killed in action. He was only there for a few weeks before being moved to command of the 4th Guards Brigade in late June, which soon became the 1st Guards Brigade and which he led at the Battle of Loos in September.

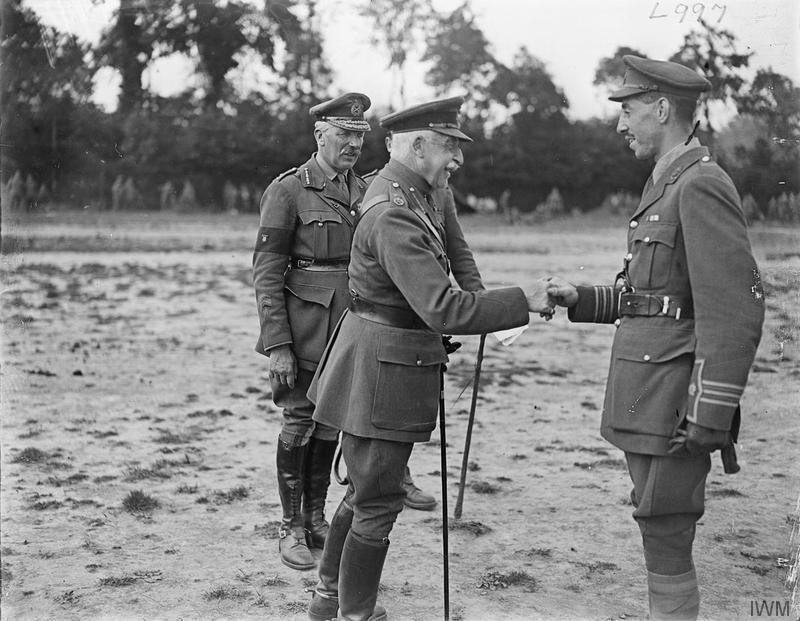
Commanding officers of the Guards Division presented to Prince Arthur, Duke of Connaught, at divisional headquarters at Bavincourt, France, 30 June 1918.

After a promotion to temporary major general in early January 1916, he was General Officer Commanding (GOC) of the Guards Division from 1916, commanding it until September 1918. Under his command, the division fought at the Battle of the Somme, including the Battle of Flers-Courcelette, the Battle of Cambrai in late 1917 and in the German spring offensives which began in March 1918. He was promoted to substantive colonel in September 1916 while his major general's rank became substantive in January 1918.

Towards the end of the war Feilding became Major-General commanding the Brigade of Guards and GOC of the London District, taking over from Lieutenant General Sir Francis Lloyd, on 1 October.

A war memorial, unveiled by Feilding, honours the battlefield at Ginchy where many British soldiers from the Guards Division fell during the Somme battle in 1916.

== Later life ==
In June 1923 he was made GOC 56th (1st London) Division, taking over from Major General Sir Cecil Pereira. Feilding retired from the army in June 1927.

He died in 1932, at the age of 66, and is buried at St. Editha's Church in Monks Kirby.

== Bibliography ==
- Boff, Jonathan (2012). Winning and Losing on the Western Front. Cambridge University Press. ISBN 978-1-107-44902-2.
- Davies, Frank; Maddocks, Graham (2014) [1995]. Bloody Red Tabs: General Officer Casualties of the Great War 1914–1918. Barnsley, South Yorkshire: Leo Cooper. ISBN 978-1-78346-237-7.

Military offices
Preceded by The Earl of Cavan	GOC Guards Division; 1916–1918	Succeeded by Torquhil Matheson
Preceded by Sir Francis Lloyd	GOC London District; 1918–1920	Succeeded by Sir George Jeffreys
Preceded by Sir Cecil Pereira	GOC 56th (1st London) Division; 1923–1927	Succeeded by Hubert Isacke
