= Torquhil Matheson =

British Army general

General Sir Torquhil Matheson Bt KCB CMG
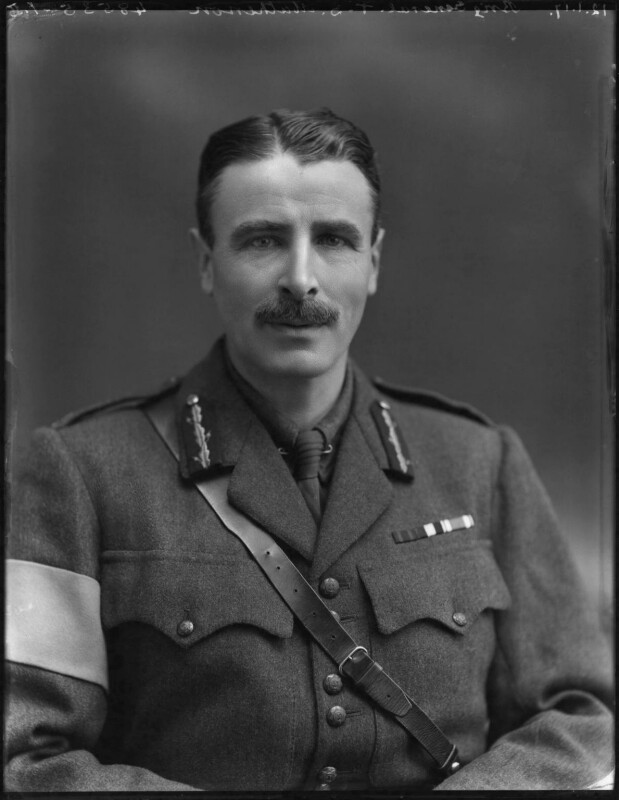
- Matheson in 1917
- Born: 4 February 1871; St George Hanover Square, London, England
- Died: 13 November 1963 (aged 92); Camberley, Surrey, England
- Military career
- Allegiance: United Kingdom
- Branch: British Army
- Service years: 1890–1935
- Rank: General
- Units: Bedfordshire Regiment; Coldstream Guards
- Commands: Western Command, India; 54th (East Anglian) Division; 7th Division; 7th Guards Brigade; Guards Division; 4th Division; 20th (Light) Division; 46th Brigade; 3rd Battalion, Coldstream Guards
- Conflicts: Second Boer War; First World War
- Awards: Knight Commander of the Order of the Bath; Companion of the Order of St Michael and St George; Mentioned in Despatches; Croix de Guerre (France)

General Sir Torquhil George Matheson, 5th Baronet, KCB, CMG (4 February 1871 − 13 November 1963) was a Scottish officer who commanded three different divisions of the British Army in some of the heaviest fighting of the First World War. He had previously served in the militia and with the Coldstream Guards in the Second Boer War. For his service, he was knighted in 1921 and in 1944 he inherited the Matheson baronetcy from his brother Roderick.

== Early life and family ==
Torquhil Matheson was born on 4 February 1871, the youngest child of Sir Alexander Matheson, 1st Baronet, and was educated at Eton College. He inherited the baronetcy in 1944 when his four older brothers (including the 2nd, 3rd and 4th Baronets) predeceased him and three nephews (the 3rd Baronet's only sons) were all killed in action in the First World War.

In 1900 Matheson married Ella Louisa Linton. They divorced in 1923. He then married Lady Elizabeth Mary Gertrude Lucia Sophia Keppel, the youngest child of Arnold Keppel, 8th Earl of Albemarle. They had two sons:

- Major Sir Torquhil Alexander Matheson of Matheson, 6th Bt. (15 August 1925 – 9 April 1993)
- Major Sir Fergus John Matheson of Matheson, 7th Bt. (22 February 1927 – 2017)

== Military career ==
Destined for a career in the British Armed Forces, Matheson was commissioned as a second lieutenant into the 4th (Militia) Battalion of the Bedfordshire Regiment (later the Bedfordshire and Hertfordshire Regiment) on 15 December 1888. On 2 June 1894, Matheson transferred from the Bedfordshires, in which he was then a lieutenant, to the Coldstream Guards as a second lieutenant again, and was promoted lieutenant in that regiment on 1 December 1897. He served in the Second Boer War, as adjutant of the 1st Battalion, Coldstream Guards from 1899 until May 1902. The battalion took part in the battles of Belmont (23 November 1899), Enslin, Modder River (28 November 1899) and Magersfontein (11 December 1899), and he was mentioned in despatches, and promoted to captain on 20 April 1901.

Following the end of the war, Matheson left Cape Town in the SS Carisbrook Castle in September 1902, arriving at Southampton early the following month. He was appointed regimental adjutant to the Coldstream Guards on 1 January 1903.

At the outbreak of the First World War in August 1914, Matheson went with his regiment to France and fought in several actions, being promoted to the brevet rank of lieutenant colonel in February 1915 and taking command of the 3rd Battalion.

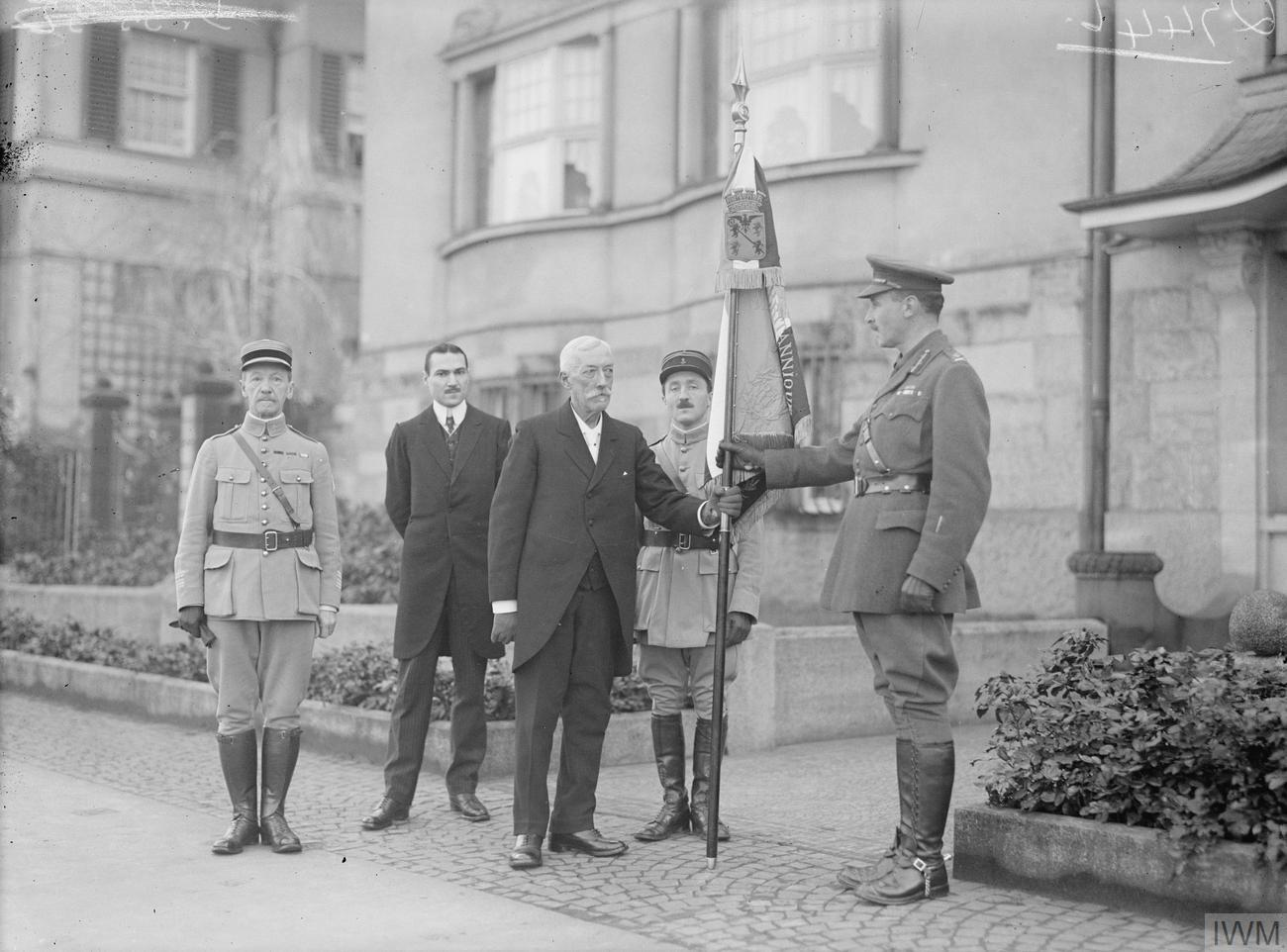
Mayor of Maubeuge presenting the Guards Division with a flag as an appreciation from the town which was taken by the division on 9 November 1918. Major General Torquhil Matheson is seen receiving the flag, 14 November 1918.

In July 1915, Matheson was advanced to the temporary rank of brigadier general and placed in command of the 46th Brigade, part of the 15th (Scottish) Division. His brevet rank was advanced to colonel in January 1917, and shortly afterwards was awarded the Order of Saint Stanislaus, 3rd Class. He remained commanding the 46th Brigade until March 1917, when he was promoted to major general and was made general officer commanding (GOC) of the 20th (Light) Division. In August, shortly before the division was due to deploy in the Battle of Passchendaele, Matheson was severely affected by a German gas barrage that struck his headquarters, forcing him to relinquish control of the division. In September, now presumably recovered, he was promoted once again to temporary major general (having reverted to brevet colonel upon leaving his old division) and took over the 4th Division, remaining in this position until September 1918, when he was replaced by Major General Louis Lipsett and took charge of the Guards Division, which he led for the final months of the war until the armistice with Germany in November 1918, which ended hostilities.

In January 1918, Matheson was appointed a Companion of the Order of the Bath and the following year was awarded the Croix de Guerre and appointed a Companion of the Order of St Michael and St George on relinquishing command of the Guards Division, which also saw him relinquish his temporary rank of major general and revert to brevet colonel. He was, however, granted his major general's rank, now made permanent, in June and in January 1920 was given a temporary appointment in the command of a division. In 1922, he was advanced to Knight Commander of the Order of the Bath "for valuable services rendered in the Field with the Waziristan Force", and commanded the 7th Guards Brigade and then the 7th Infantry Division. He then became GOC of the 54th (East Anglian) Division, a Territorial Army (TA) formation, in February 1927. He was promoted to lieutenant general in June 1930.

He gave up this appointment in September of that year, and, on 30 June 1931, Matheson was appointed to his last command, as general officer commanding-in-chief (GOC-in-C) Western Command, India. On 30 June 1935 he retired from that post as a full general, having been promoted to that rank in July 1934. On 2 July he was gazetted to the Retired List. In 1944 succeeded he to his father's baronetcy on the death of his elder brother Roderick.

He himself died in November 1963, at the age of 92.

== Bibliography ==
- Davies, Frank; Maddocks, Graham (2014). Bloody Red Tabs: General Officer Casualties of the Great War 1914–1918. Pen and Sword. ISBN 978-1-4738-1251-2.
- Hart, H.G. (1903). Hart's Annual Army List. Vol. 64. London: John Murray.

Military offices
Preceded by William Douglas Smith	GOC 20th (Light) Division; March–August 1917	Succeeded by William Douglas Smith
Preceded by William Lambton	GOC 4th Division; 1917–1918	Succeeded by Louis Lipsett
Preceded by Geoffrey Feilding	GOC Guards Division; 1918–1919	Post disbanded
Preceded by John Duncan	GOC 54th (East Anglian) Division; 1927–1930	Succeeded by Francis Marshall
Preceded by Sir Charles Harington	GOC-in-C, Western Command, India; 1931–1935	Succeeded by Sir Ivo Vesey
Baronetage of the United Kingdom
Preceded by Roderick Matheson	Baronet (of Lochalsh); 1944–1963	Succeeded by Torquil Matheson
