= Morval, Pas-de-Calais =

Morval
- Commune
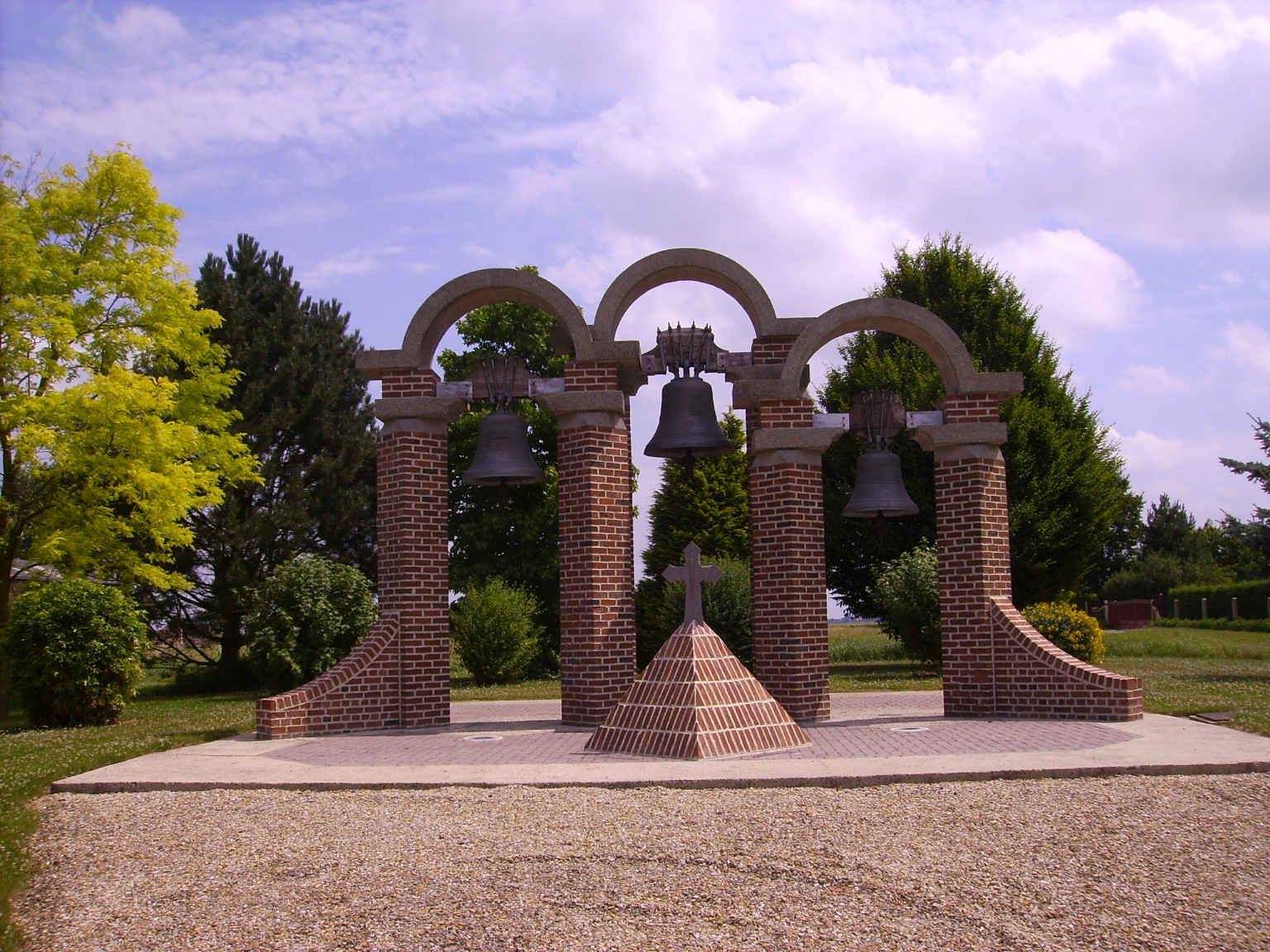
- The church bells of Morval

- Coat of arms
- Location of Morval
- Location within France Location within Hauts-de-France
- Coordinates: 50°01′55″N 2°52′24″E
- Country: France
- Region: Hauts-de-France
- Department: Pas-de-Calais
- Arrondissement: Arras
- Canton: Bapaume
- Intercommunality: CC Sud-Artois

Government
  - Mayor (2020–2026): Patrice Welele
- Area^{1}: 2.39 km^{2} (0.92 sq mi)
- Elevation: 151 m (495 ft)
- Highest elevation: 152 m (499 ft)
- Lowest elevation: 108 m (354 ft)
- Population (2023): 87
  - Density: 36/km^{2} (94/sq mi)
- Time zone: UTC+01:00 (CET)
  - Summer (DST): UTC+02:00 (CEST)
- INSEE/Postal code: 62593 /62450
- ^{1} French Land Register data, which excludes lakes, ponds, glaciers > 1 km^{2} (0.386 sq mi or 247 acres) and river estuaries.

Morval (French pronunciation: [mɔʁval]) is a commune in the Pas-de-Calais department in the Hauts-de-France region of France.

== Geography ==
Morval is located 30 km (19 mi) south of Arras, on the D11 road, completely surrounded by the department of the Somme. The junction between A1 and A2 autoroutes is less than 1.5 km (0.93 mi) away.

== Population ==
Historical population
Year	Pop.	±% p.a.
1968	85	—
1975	84	−0.17%
1982	94	+1.62%
1990	95	+0.13%
1999	91	−0.48%
2007	85	−0.85%
2012	102	+3.71%
2017	94	−1.62%
2023	87	−1.28%
Source: INSEE

== History ==
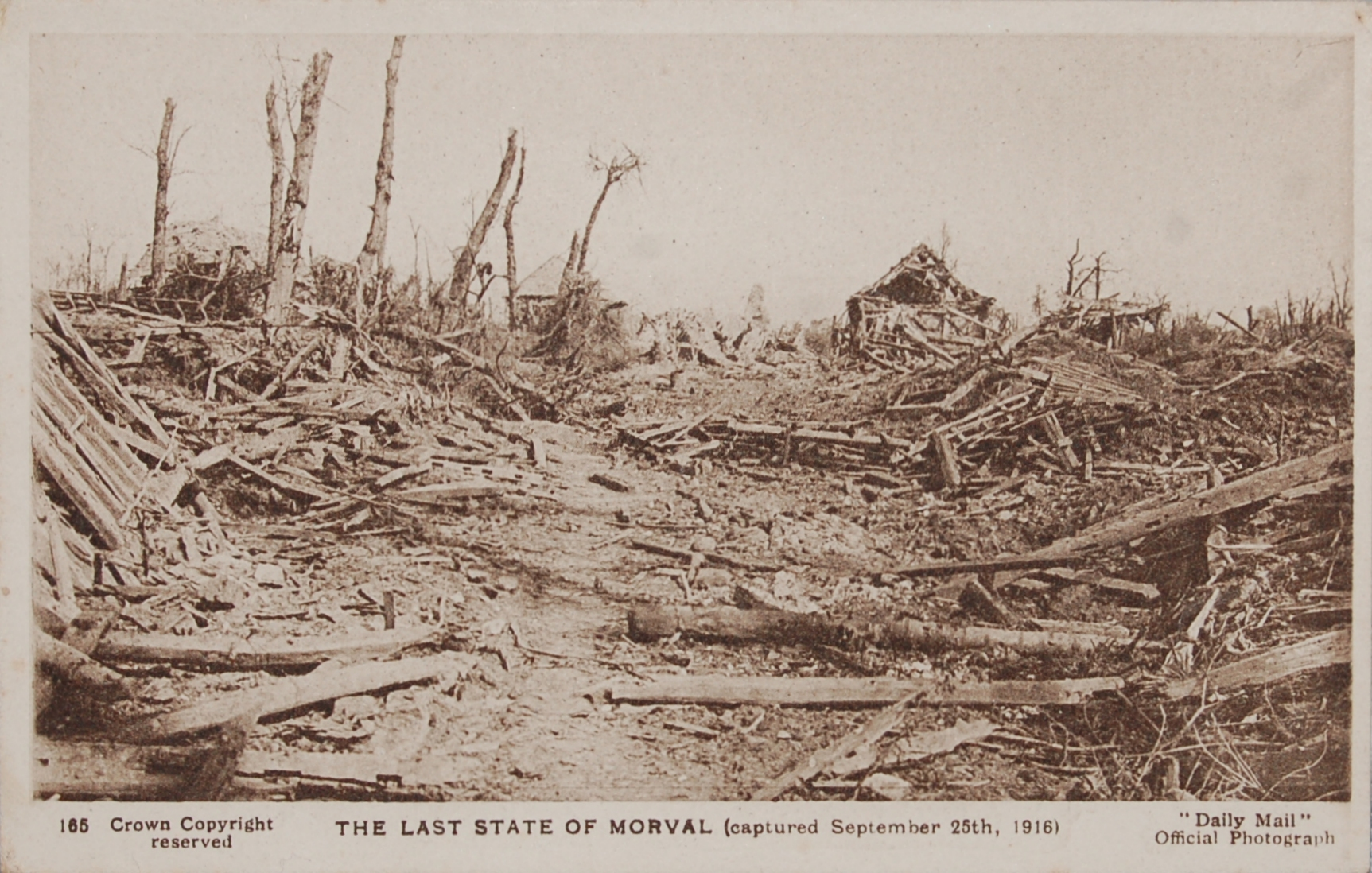
Morval in ruins during World War I

The Battle of Morval, a British offensive action, occurred as part of the larger Battle of the Somme in September 1916. It destroyed Morval and nearby villages.

The village, including the church of St. Vaast, was rebuilt after World War I. The Commonwealth War Graves Commission cemeteries in Morval hold the graves of 54 British soldiers, while the Community cemetery includes the graves of two airmen.

== See also ==
- Communes of the Pas-de-Calais department
