= Guards Division (United Kingdom) =

- Divisional insignia.
- Active: August 1915 – 29 April 1919; 12 June 1945 – January 1947
- Country: United Kingdom
- Branch: British Army
- Type: Infantry
- Role: Heavy infantry
- Size: Division
- Patron: King George V
- Engagements: First World War; Western Front; Battle of Loos; Battle of the Somme; Battle of Cambrai; First Battle of the Somme; Second Battle of the Somme; Second Battle of Arras; Hindenburg Line; Third Battle of Picardy

Commanders
- Notable commanders: Earl of Cavan

The Guards Division was an infantry division of the British Army that was formed in the Great War in France in 1915 from battalions of the Guards regiments from the Regular Army. The division served on the Western Front for the duration of the First World War. The division's insignia was the "All Seeing Eye".

There was also a Guards Division in the Second World War which was formed on 12 June 1945 from the Guards Armoured Division which had undergone reorganisation.

== History ==
=== First World War ===
==== Formation ====
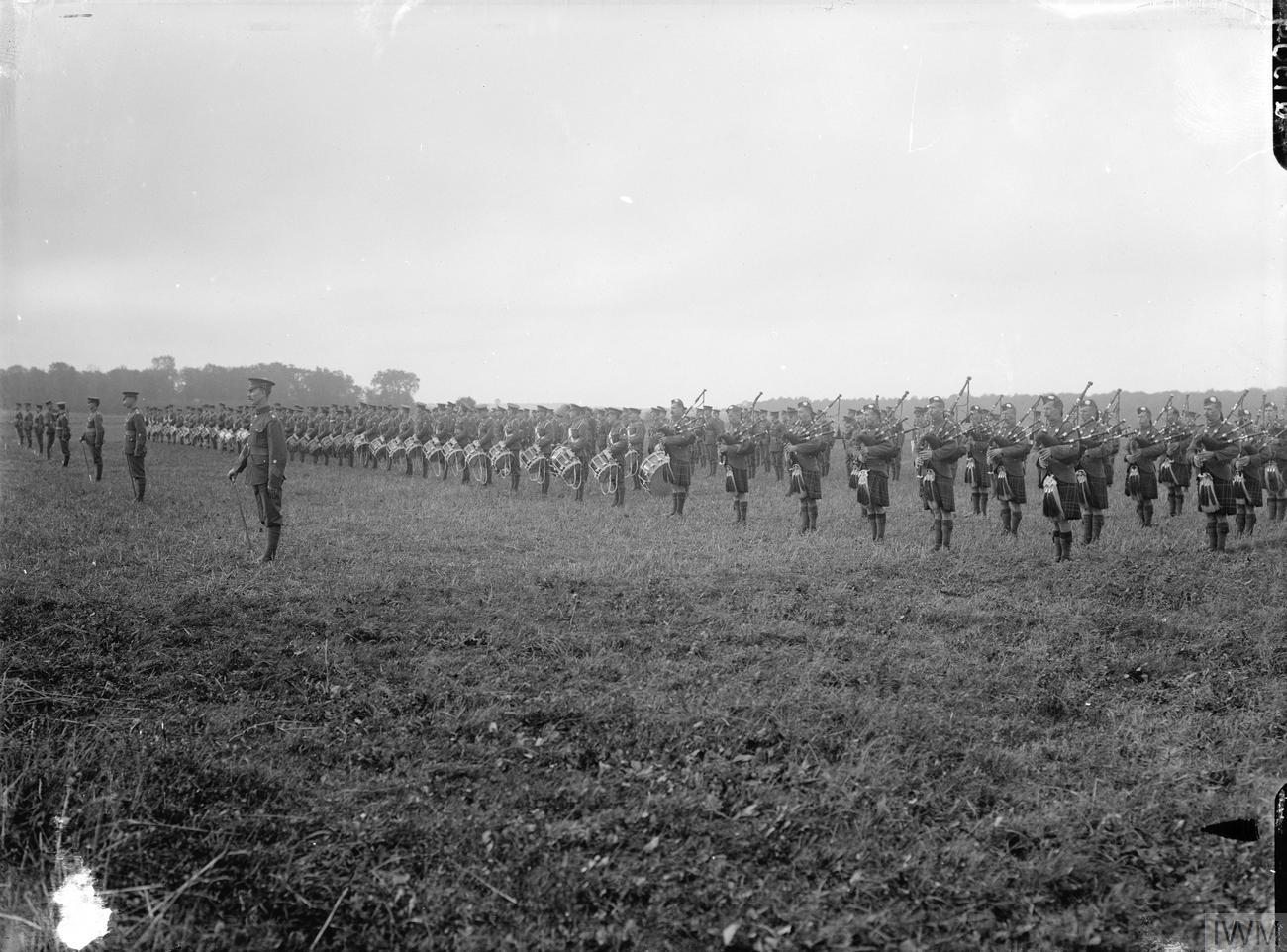
The massed pipes and drums of the Guards Division seen during an inspection of the division by Prince Arthur, the duke of Connaught, at Lumbres, near Wizernesat, 1 November 1916.

In July 1915, during the First World War (1914–1918), George V approved the formation of a Guards Division and in August 1915 the division was formed at Lumbres, near St Omer, France.

The 4th (Guards) Brigade was transferred complete from the 2nd Division and redesignated as the 1st Guards Brigade; the 2nd Guards Brigade was formed with two battalions from England and two more transferred from 1st (Guards) Brigade, 1st Division; and the 3rd Guards Brigade likewise with two more battalions from England and two transferred from 20th Brigade, of the 7th Division. Soon after formation, each brigade formed a machine gun (M.G.) company of 16 machine guns, and between March and May 1916 each brigade was also provided with a Trench Mortar (T.M.) Battery of eight 3" Stokes Mortars.

The division was provided with three artillery brigades (Note: The basic organic unit of the Royal Artillery was, and is, the Battery. When grouped together they formed brigades, in the same way that infantry battalions or cavalry regiments were grouped together in brigades. At the outbreak of the First World War, a field artillery brigade of headquarters (4 officers, 37 other ranks), three batteries (5 and 193 each), and a brigade ammunition column (4 and 154) had a total strength just under 800 so was broadly comparable to an infantry battalion (just over 1,000) or a cavalry regiment (about 550). Like an infantry battalion, an artillery brigade was usually commanded by a lieutenant colonel. These figures refer to brigades of three 6-gun batteries; artillery brigades of Kitchener's Army were reorganized on a four 4-gun basis in January and February 1915, so strengths would be approximately unchanged. Artillery brigades were redesignated as regiments in 1938.) – LXXIV, LXXV and LXXVI Brigades, RFA each of four batteries of four 18 pounder guns – from the 16th (Irish) Division and a howitzer brigade – LXI (Howitzer) Brigade, RFA of four batteries of four 4.5" howitzers – from the 11th (Northern) Division which remained in England when the division was posted to Gallipoli. 16th (Irish) Division also provided the Divisional Ammunition Column, two field companies of Royal Engineers and the signal company (Royal Engineer Signals Service). The third field company joined from 7th Division. The pioneers were the 4th Battalion, Coldstream Guards which joined from England on 18 August.

==== War service ====
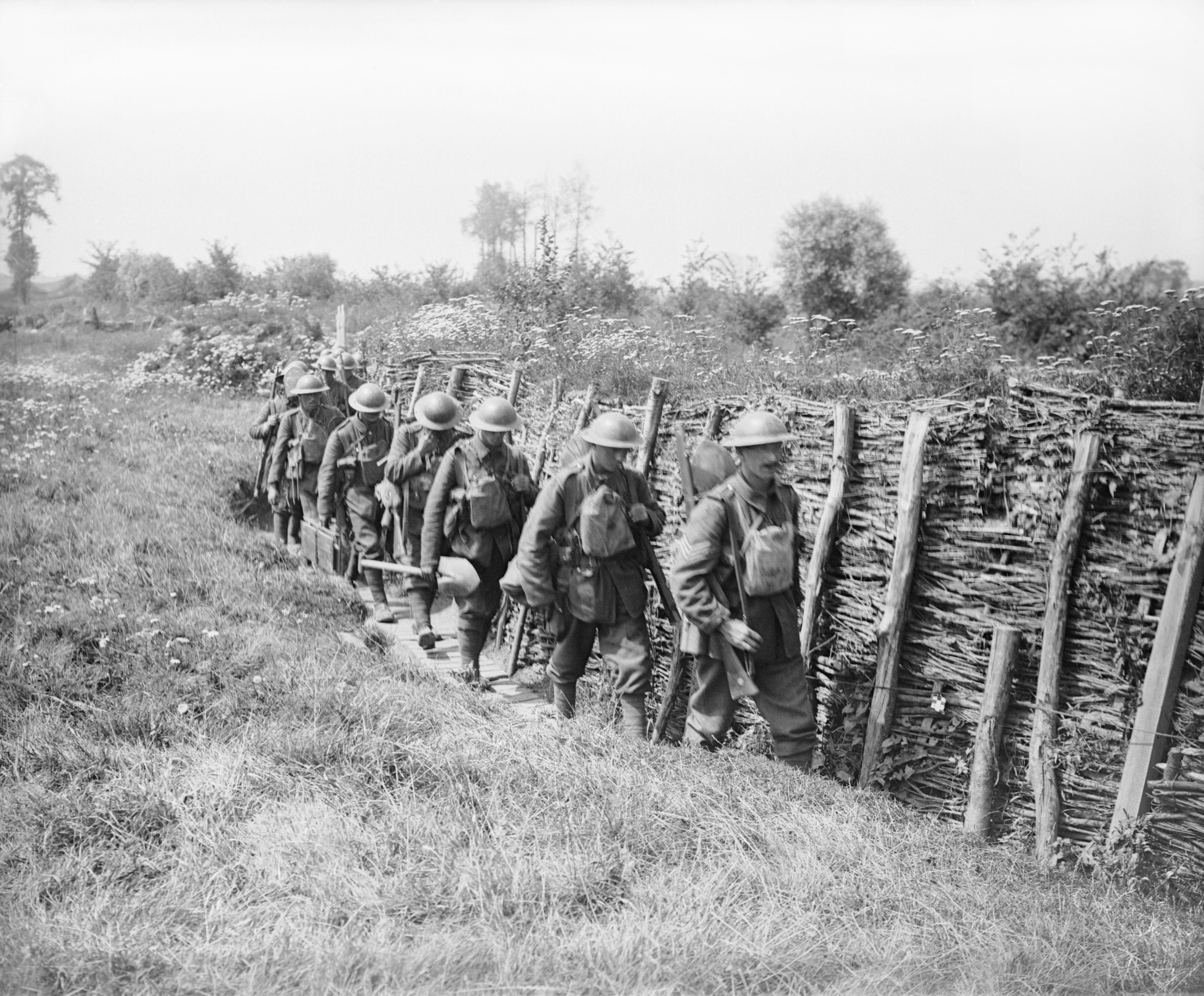
Men of the Irish Guards going up a communication trench at Elverdinghe, 30 July 1917.

In 1915, the Guards Division took part in the Battle of Loos (26 September – 8 October) and Hohenzollern Redoubt (18 – 19 October).

In 1916, it fought in the later stages of the Battle of the Somme, in particular the Battle of Flers–Courcelette (15 – 16 and 20 – 22 September), the Battle of Morval (25 – 28 September), and the Capture of Lesboeufs (25 September).

In 1917, it saw action in the Battle of Passchendaele (or the Third Battle of Ypres) including the Battle of Pilckem Ridge (31 August – 2 July), the Battle of Poelcappelle (9 October), and the First Battle of Passchendaele (12 October). It then took part in the Battle of Cambrai (24 November – 3 December).

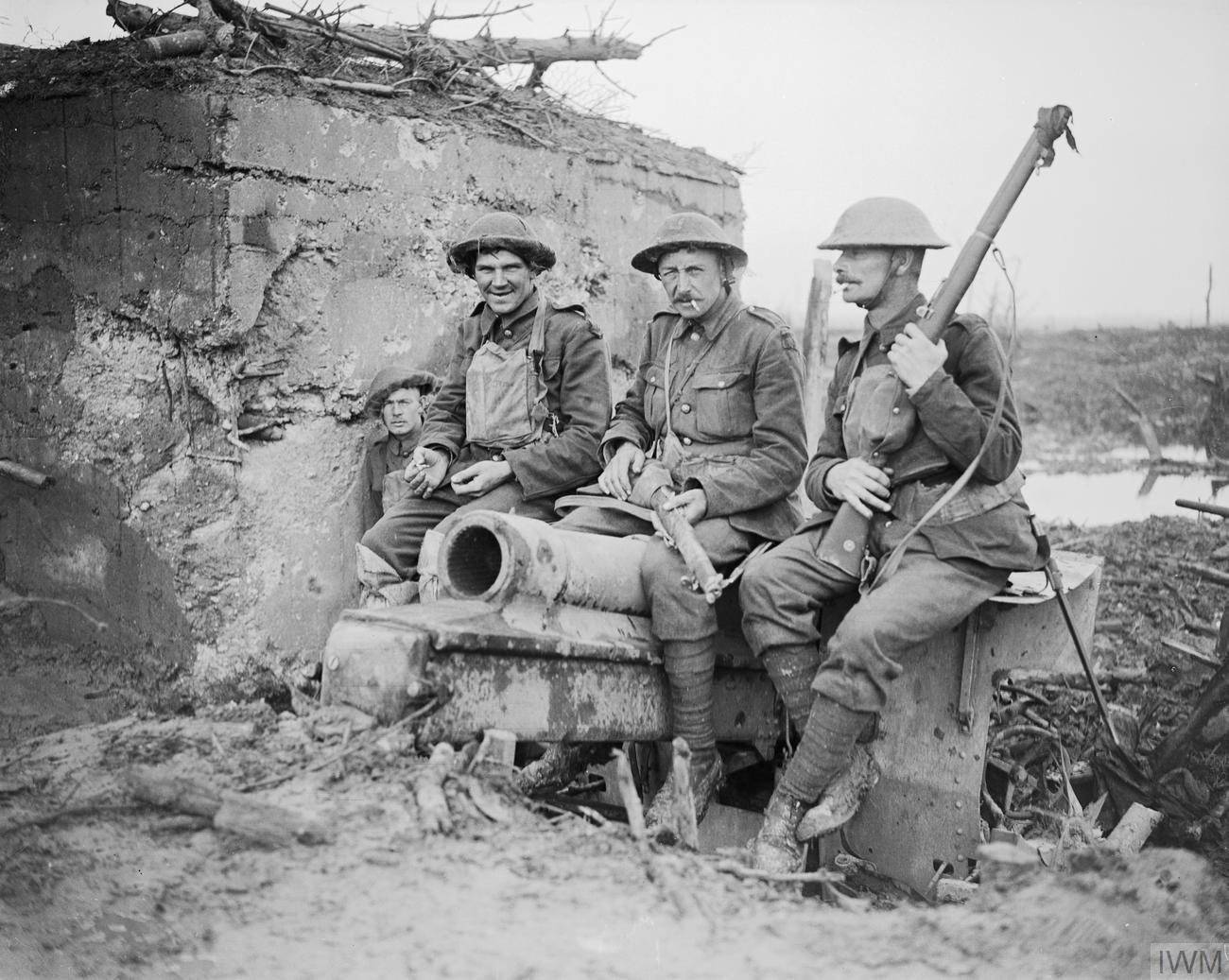
Four men of the 4th (Pioneer) Battalion, Coldstream Guards perched on a wrecked gun outside a German concrete blockhouse on the outskirts of Houthulst Forest, Belgium, 9 October 1917.

In February 1918, British (Note: As distinct from the Australian, Canadian and the New Zealand divisions which remained on a 12-battalion basis.) divisions on the Western Front were reduced from a 12-battalion to a 9-battalion basis (brigades from four to three battalions). As a result, the 4th Guards Brigade was formed on 8 February 1918 by taking a battalion from each of the brigades:

- 3rd Battalion, Coldstream Guards from 1st Guards Brigade
- 2nd Battalion, Irish Guards from the 2nd Guards Brigade and
- 4th Battalion, Grenadier Guards from the 3rd Guards Brigade.

The 4th Guards Brigade was transferred to the 31st Division at noon on the same day. On 25 February, the pioneer battalion – 4th Battalion, Coldstream Guards – was reorganized from a four-company to a three-company basis.

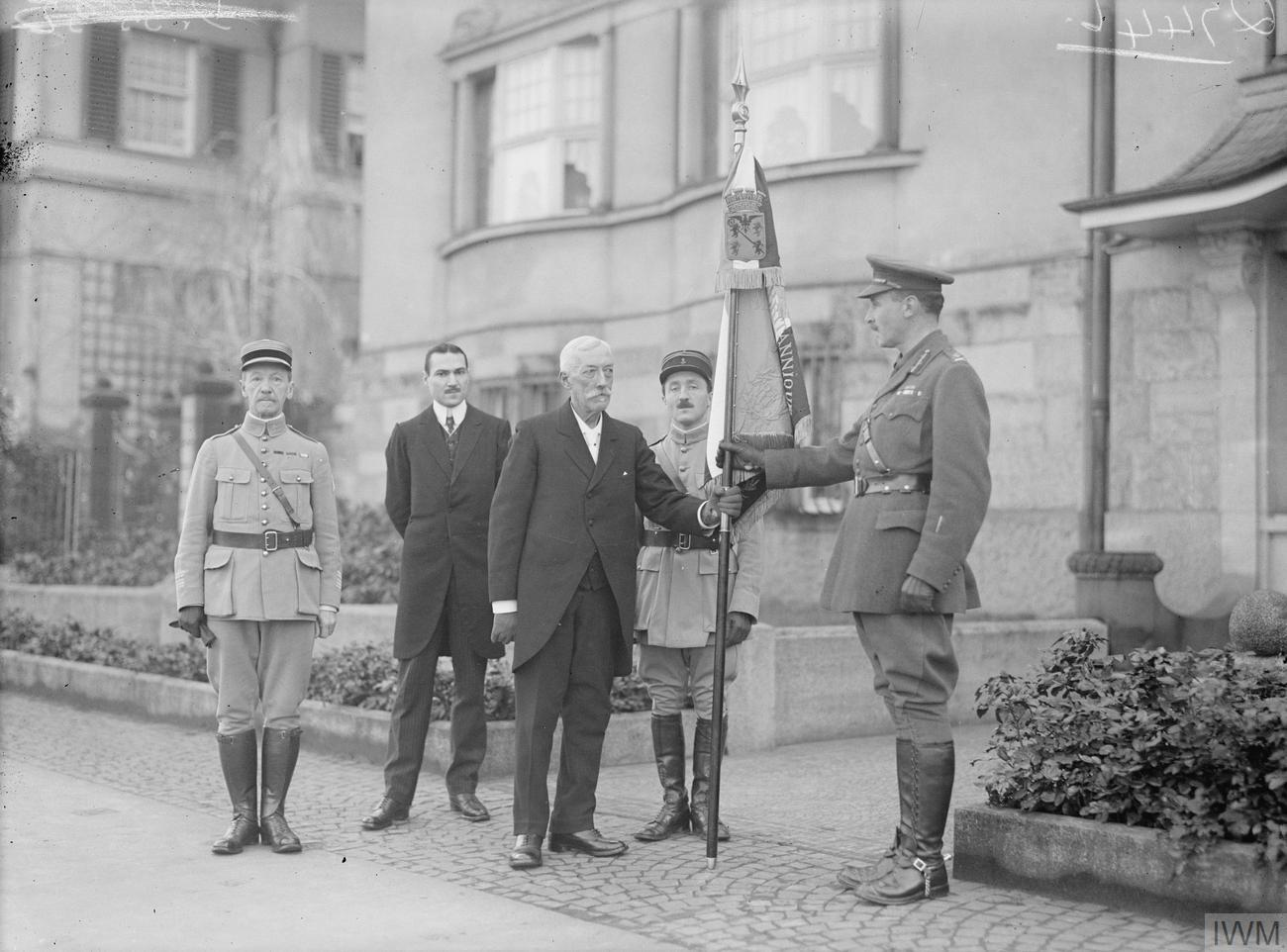
Mayor of Maubeuge presenting the Guards Division with a flag as an appreciation from the town which was taken by the division on 9 November 1918. Major-General Torquhil Matheson is seen receiving the flag, 14 November 1918.

1918 saw the return of the war of movement. It had to withstand the German Army's Spring Offensive in the First Battles of the Somme (1 – 25 March) then switched over to counter-attack in the Second Battles of the Somme (21 – 23 August), the Second Battle of Arras (26 August – 3 September), the Battles of the Hindenburg Line (12 September – 12 October), and in the Final Advance in Picardy including the battles of the Selle and of the Sambre. Its final action was the Capture of Maubeuge on 9 November. It ended the war with VI Corps in the British Third Army.

=== Post-war ===
At the Armistice of 11 November 1918, the division was in and around Maubeuge, and on 17 November it regained 4th Guards Brigade which was broken up and the battalions returned to their original brigades. The next day it began the march on Germany and crossed the frontier on 11 December. By 19 December it had reached the Cologne area. Units started returning to England on 20 February 1919 and the last had completed the move by 29 April.

=== Second World War ===
The Guards Division was reformed during the Second World War on 12 June 1945 by the reorganization and redesignation of the Guards Armoured Division. The division retained all of its original units, but with some changes:

- 5th Guards Armoured Brigade (three armoured battalions and one motorized infantry battalion) was converted to infantry as 5th Guards Brigade
- 32nd Guards Infantry Brigade remained unchanged except that 2nd Battalion, Welsh Guards (originally the reconnaissance unit of the Guards Armoured Division) was converted to infantry and joined the brigade
- 2nd Household Cavalry Regiment was transferred from XXX Corps on 12 June 1945 as the new reconnaissance unit
- 6th Guards Tank Brigade (three tank battalions) was converted to infantry as 6th Guards Brigade and joined the division on 19 June
- 92nd (5th London) Field Regiment, Royal Artillery joined the division on 12 June from 5th Infantry Division as the third field artillery regiment to match three infantry brigades

Major-General Sir Allan Adair remained in command of the reorganized division. In January 1947, the division was disbanded.

== Orders of battle ==
Orders of Battle – August 1915, November 1918, June 1945
On formation, August 1915
1st Guards Brigade: 2nd Battalion, Grenadier Guards; 2nd Battalion, Coldstream Guards; 3rd Battalion, Coldstream Guards; 1st Battalion, Irish Guards; 1st Guards Brigade M.G. Company	Guards Divisional Artillery: LXXIV Brigade, RFA; A, B, C and D Batteries (Note: Sixteen 18 pounder guns.); LXXIV Brigade Ammunition Column; LXXV Brigade, RFA; A, B, C and D Batteries; LXXV Brigade Ammunition Column; LXXVI Brigade, RFA; A, B, C and D Batteries; LXXVI Brigade Ammunition Column; LXI (Howitzer) Brigade, RFA; A (H), B (H), C (H) and D (H) Batteries (Note: Sixteen 4.5" howitzers.); LXI (H) Brigade Ammunition Column; Divisional Ammunition Column	Mounted Troops: Household Cavalry Division Squadron (Note: Arrived in France 5 August 1915. Broken up 20 June 1916 and held as reinforcements for 1st Life Guards.); Household Cavalry Cyclist Company (Note: Arrived in France 13 August 1915. Broken up 27 May 1916 and held as reinforcements for 2nd Life Guards and Royal Horse Guards.); Royal Engineers: 55th, 75th and 76th Field Companies; Guards Divisional Signal Company; Pioneers: 4th Battalion, Coldstream Guards; Medical: 3rd, 4th and 9th Field Ambulances, RAMC; 46th Mobile Veterinary Section, AVC; Guards Divisional Train, ASC: 11th, 124th, 168th and 436th Companies
2nd Guards Brigade: 3rd Battalion, Grenadier Guards; 1st Battalion, Coldstream Guards; 1st Battalion, Scots Guards; 2nd Battalion, Irish Guards; 2nd Guards Brigade M.G. Company	Guards Divisional Artillery: LXXIV Brigade, RFA; A, B, C and D Batteries; LXXIV Brigade Ammunition Column; LXXV Brigade, RFA; A, B, C and D Batteries; LXXV Brigade Ammunition Column; LXXVI Brigade, RFA; A, B, C and D Batteries; LXXVI Brigade Ammunition Column; LXI (Howitzer) Brigade, RFA; A (H), B (H), C (H) and D (H) Batteries; LXI (H) Brigade Ammunition Column; Divisional Ammunition Column	Mounted Troops: Household Cavalry Division Squadron; Household Cavalry Cyclist Company; Royal Engineers: 55th, 75th and 76th Field Companies; Guards Divisional Signal Company; Pioneers: 4th Battalion, Coldstream Guards; Medical: 3rd, 4th and 9th Field Ambulances, RAMC; 46th Mobile Veterinary Section, AVC; Guards Divisional Train, ASC: 11th, 124th, 168th and 436th Companies
3rd Guards Brigade: 1st Battalion, Grenadier Guards; 4th Battalion, Grenadier Guards; 2nd Battalion, Scots Guards; 1st Battalion, Welsh Guards; 3rd Guards Brigade M.G. Company	Guards Divisional Artillery: LXXIV Brigade, RFA; A, B, C and D Batteries; LXXIV Brigade Ammunition Column; LXXV Brigade, RFA; A, B, C and D Batteries; LXXV Brigade Ammunition Column; LXXVI Brigade, RFA; A, B, C and D Batteries; LXXVI Brigade Ammunition Column; LXI (Howitzer) Brigade, RFA; A (H), B (H), C (H) and D (H) Batteries; LXI (H) Brigade Ammunition Column; Divisional Ammunition Column	Mounted Troops: Household Cavalry Division Squadron; Household Cavalry Cyclist Company; Royal Engineers: 55th, 75th and 76th Field Companies; Guards Divisional Signal Company; Pioneers: 4th Battalion, Coldstream Guards; Medical: 3rd, 4th and 9th Field Ambulances, RAMC; 46th Mobile Veterinary Section, AVC; Guards Divisional Train, ASC: 11th, 124th, 168th and 436th Companies
At the end of the war, November 1918
1st Guards Brigade: 2nd Battalion, Grenadier Guards; 2nd Battalion, Coldstream Guards; 1st Battalion, Irish Guards; 1st Guards T.M. Battery (Note: Eight 3-inch Stokes mortars.)	Guards Divisional Artillery: LXXIV Brigade, RFA; A, B, C and D (H) Batteries (Note: Eighteen 18-pounder guns and six QF 4.5-inch howitzer.); LXXV Brigade, RFA; A, B, C and D (H) Batteries; Divisional Ammunition Column; Trench Mortar Batteries; X and Y Guards Medium (Note: Six 2-inch Medium Mortars each.)	Royal Engineers: 55th, 75th and 76th Field Companies; Guards Divisional Signal Company; Pioneers: 4th Battalion, Coldstream Guards; Machine Gunners: 4th Battalion, Guards Machine Gun Regiment (Note: Formed 1 March 1918 from 1st, 2nd and 3rd Guards Brigade and 4th (Divisional) M.G. Companies.); Medical: 3rd, 4th and 9th Field Ambulances, RAMC; 46th Mobile Veterinary Section, AVC; Divisional Employment Company: Guards; Guards Divisional Train, ASC: 11th, 124th, 168th and 436th Companies
2nd Guards Brigade: 3rd Battalion, Grenadier Guards; 1st Battalion, Coldstream Guards; 1st Battalion, Scots Guards; 2nd Guards T.M. Battery	Guards Divisional Artillery: LXXIV Brigade, RFA; A, B, C and D (H) Batteries; LXXV Brigade, RFA; A, B, C and D (H) Batteries; Divisional Ammunition Column; Trench Mortar Batteries; X and Y Guards Medium	Royal Engineers: 55th, 75th and 76th Field Companies; Guards Divisional Signal Company; Pioneers: 4th Battalion, Coldstream Guards; Machine Gunners: 4th Battalion, Guards Machine Gun Regiment; Medical: 3rd, 4th and 9th Field Ambulances, RAMC; 46th Mobile Veterinary Section, AVC; Divisional Employment Company: Guards; Guards Divisional Train, ASC: 11th, 124th, 168th and 436th Companies
3rd Guards Brigade: 1st Battalion, Grenadier Guards; 2nd Battalion, Scots Guards; 1st Battalion, Welsh Guards; 3rd Guards T.M. Battery	Guards Divisional Artillery: LXXIV Brigade, RFA; A, B, C and D (H) Batteries; LXXV Brigade, RFA; A, B, C and D (H) Batteries; Divisional Ammunition Column; Trench Mortar Batteries; X and Y Guards Medium	Royal Engineers: 55th, 75th and 76th Field Companies; Guards Divisional Signal Company; Pioneers: 4th Battalion, Coldstream Guards; Machine Gunners: 4th Battalion, Guards Machine Gun Regiment; Medical: 3rd, 4th and 9th Field Ambulances, RAMC; 46th Mobile Veterinary Section, AVC; Divisional Employment Company: Guards; Guards Divisional Train, ASC: 11th, 124th, 168th and 436th Companies

=== 1945 ===
Order of battle when reformed from the Guards Armoured Division, June 1945

5th Guards Brigade

- 1st Battalion, Grenadier Guards (Note: Converted from a Motor Battalion.)
- 2nd Battalion, Grenadier Guards (Note: Converted from an Armoured Battalion.)
- 1st Battalion, Coldstream Guards
- 2nd Battalion, Irish Guards

Royal Artillery

- 55th (Wessex) Field Regiment, Royal Artillery
- 92nd (5th London) Field Regiment, Royal Artillery (Note: Transferred from the 5th Infantry Division on 12 June 1945.)
- 153rd (Leicestershire Yeomanry) Field Regiment, Royal Artillery
- 75th Anti-Tank Regiment, Royal Artillery
- 94th Light Anti-Aircraft Regiment, Royal Artillery

Royal Engineers

- 14th Field Company
- 615th Field Company
- 148th Field Park Company
- 11th Bridging Troop

Signals

- Guard Division Signals, RCS (Note: Redesignated from Guard Armoured Division Signals, RCS.)

Reconnaissance

- 2nd Household Cavalry Regiment (Note: Transferred from XXX Corps on 12 June 1945.)

Infantry

- 1st Independent MG Company (Note: 1st Independent MG Company was formed from the 4th Battalion, Royal Northumberland Fusiliers.)

6th Guards Brigade

- 4th Battalion, Grenadier Guards
- 4th Battalion, Coldstream Guards
- 3rd Battalion, Scots Guards

32nd Guards Infantry Brigade

- 5th Battalion, Coldstream Guards
- 2nd Battalion, Scots Guards
- 3rd Battalion, Irish Guards
- 2nd Battalion, Welsh Guards (Note: 2nd Battalion, Welsh Guards was the reconnaissance unit of the Guards Armoured Division. It was converted to infantry and assigned to 32nd Guards Infantry Brigade on 20 June 1945.)

== Notable members ==
2nd Lieutenant Jack Kipling, son of the famous author Rudyard Kipling, served with the Guards Division in France as a platoon commander in the 2nd Battalion, Irish Guards. He was aged just 18, his birthday being only a month before, and was killed in the 1915 Battle of Loos, yet exactly how he died still remains a mystery even nearly 100 years later.

== Commanders ==
The division had the following General Officers Commanding (GOCs):

From	Name	Notes
15 August 1915	Brigadier-General F. J. Heyworth	temporary
18 August 1915	Major-General Earl of Cavan	
3 January 1916	Major-General G. P. T. Feilding	
11 September 1918	Major-General T. G. Matheson	disestablished 1919
12 September 1942	Major-General A. H. S. Adair	on re-establishment (Note: Major-General A. H. S. Adair was in command of the Guards Armoured Division when it was renamed the Guards Division.)
December 1945	Major-General J. C. O. Marriott	

== See also ==
- List of British divisions in World War I
- List of British divisions in World War II
- Guards Division for the administrative formation

== Bibliography ==
- Becke, Archibald F. (1935). Order of Battle of Divisions Part 1–The Regular British Divisions. London: HMSO. OCLC 4405016.
- Becke, Archibald F. (1938). Order of Battle of Divisions Part 3A. New Army Divisions (9–26). London: HMSO. OCLC 4405016.
- Becke, Archibald F. (1945). Order of Battle of Divisions Part 3B. New Army Divisions (30-41) & 63rd (R.N.) Division. London: HMSO. OCLC 4405016.
- Bellis, Malcolm A. (1994). Regiments of the British Army 1939–1945 (Armour & Infantry). London: Military Press International. ISBN 978-0-85420-999-6.
- Bellis, Malcolm A. (1995). Regiments of the British Army 1939–1945 (Artillery). London: Military Press International. ISBN 978-0-85420-110-5.
- Headlam, Cuthbert (2010) [1924]. History of the Guards Division in the Great War, 1915–1918. Vol. I (repr. Naval & Military Press, Uckfield ed.). Edinburgh: John Murray. ISBN 978-1-84342-124-5. Archived from the original on 29 November 2022.
- Headlam, Cuthbert (2010) [1924]. History of the Guards Division in the Great War 1915–1918. Vol. II (repr. Naval & Military Press, Uckfield ed.). London: John Murray. ISBN 978-1-84342-124-5.
- Joslen, Lt-Col H. F. (1990) [1st. Pub. HMSO:1960]. Orders of Battle, Second World War, 1939–1945. London: London Stamp Exchange. ISBN 978-0-948130-03-8.
- Order of Battle of the British Armies in France (including Lines of Communication Units) and Order of Battle of the Portuguese Expeditionary Force. France: General Staff, GHQ. 1918. OCLC 74447069.
