= 149th (Northumberland) Brigade =

Northumberland Brigade 149th (Northumberland) Brigade 149th Brigade
- Active: 1908–1938
- Country: United Kingdom
- Allegiance: British Crown
- Branch: British Army
- Type: Infantry
- Size: Brigade
- Part of: Northumbrian Division; 50th (Northumbrian) Division
- HQ (peacetime): Newcastle upon Tyne
- Engagements: Western Front (World War I) Second Battle of Ypres Battle of the Somme Battle of Arras (1917) Third Battle of Ypres First Battle of the Somme (1918) Battle of the Lys (1918) Battles of the Hindenburg Line Final Advance in Picardy

Commanders
- Notable commanders: James Foster Riddell; Sir Geoffrey Feilding

The Northumberland Brigade was formed in 1908 as part of the Territorial Force of the British Army with four battalions of the Northumberland Fusiliers. The brigade was numbered as 149th (Northumberland) Brigade in 1915 and served with the 50th (Northumbrian) Division on the Western Front throughout World War I. Due to losses suffered in the Ludendorf Offensive in 1918, it had to be comprehensively reorganized. Reformed as the Northumberland Brigade post-war, it was broken up before the outbreak of World War II.

== History ==
=== Formation ===
Under the terms of the Territorial and Reserve Forces Act 1907 (7 Edw. 7, c.9), the Northumberland Brigade was formed in 1908 as part of the Territorial Force (TF). It was Headquartered in Newcastle upon Tyne and consisted of four infantry battalions of the Northumberland Fusiliers and a Transport and Supply Company:

4th Battalion, Northumberland Fusiliers (T.F.) – HQ at Hexham
5th Battalion, Northumberland Fusiliers (T.F.) – HQ at Walker, Newcastle upon Tyne
6th Battalion, Northumberland Fusiliers (T.F.) – HQ at Northumberland Road, Newcastle upon Tyne
7th Battalion, Northumberland Fusiliers (T.F.) – HQ at Alnwick
Northumberland Brigade Company, ASC (T.F.) – at Newcastle upon Tyne

It was assigned to the Northumbrian Division.

=== World War I ===
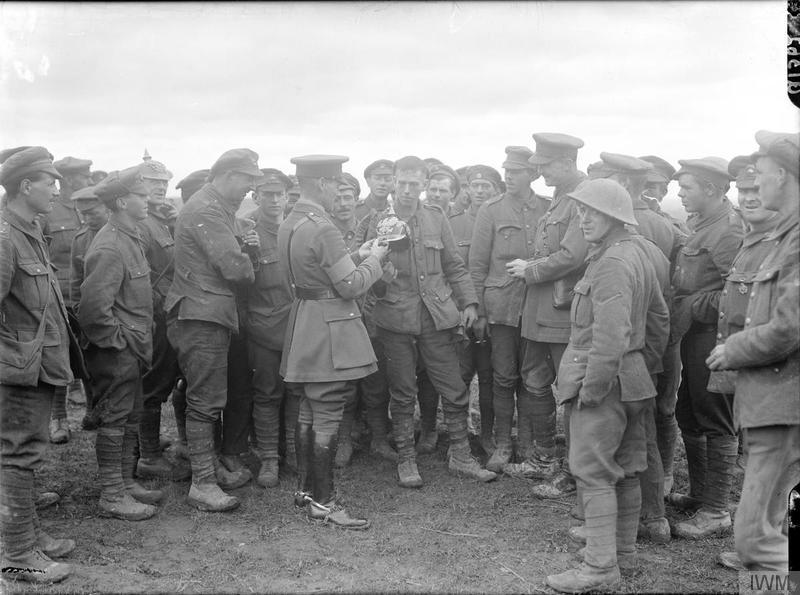
Brigadier-General Robert Montgomery Ovens, commanding the 149th Brigade, 50th Division, examining a German Pickelhaube brought in by a tommy of the 1/5th Battalion, Northumberland Fusiliers. Toutencourt, October 1916.

The brigade was mobilized on the outbreak of the war and posted to the Tyne Defences. The battalions were given fractional designations (e.g. 1/4th Battalion) with the formation of the 2nd Line battalions in 1914. (Note: In accordance with the Territorial and Reserve Forces Act 1907 (7 Edw. 7, c.9), which brought the Territorial Force into being, the TF was intended to be a home defence force for service during wartime and members could not be compelled to serve outside the country. However, on the outbreak of war on 4 August 1914, many members volunteered for Imperial Service. Therefore, TF units were split into 1st Line (liable for overseas service) and 2nd Line (home service for those unable or unwilling to serve overseas) units. 2nd Line units performed the home defence role, although in fact most of these were also posted abroad in due course. Later, a 3rd Line was formed to act as a reserve, providing trained replacements for the 1st and 2nd Line units.) In April 1915, the brigade was posted to France and on 14 May was redesignated as 149th (Northumberland) Brigade (the division became 50th (Northumbrian) Division).

The brigade served with the 50th Division on the Western Front for the rest of the war. In 1915, it took part in the Second Battle of Ypres and the Battle of the Somme in 1916. In 1917, it took part in the Battle of Arras and the Third Battle of Ypres. As a result of the losses suffered in the Ludendorf Offensive (First Battle of the Somme and Battle of the Lys), the brigade had to be comprehensively reorganized. On 15 July 1918, the Northumberland Fusiliers battalions were reduced to cadre and transferred to Lines of Communication duties; they were replaced by two battalions from Salonika (3rd Royal Fusiliers ex 85th Brigade, 28th Division and 13th Black Watch ex 81st Brigade, 27th Division) and another (2nd Royal Dublin Fusiliers) that had been in France since August 1914. Thereafter, it took part in the Battles of the Hindenburg Line and the Final Advance in Picardy.

==== Units 1914 - July 1918 ====
The brigade commanded the following units during the war:

- 1/4th Battalion, Northumberland Fusiliers (reduced to cadre and left 15 July 1918)
- 1/5th Battalion, Northumberland Fusiliers (reduced to cadre and left 15 July 1918)
- 1/6th Battalion, Northumberland Fusiliers (reduced to cadre and left 15 July 1918)
- 1/7th Battalion, Northumberland Fusiliers (left 10 February 1918 and joined 42nd (East Lancashire) Division as Pioneers) (Note: British divisions on the Western Front were reduced from a 12-battalion to a 9-battalion basis in February 1918 (brigades from four to three battalions).)
- 1/5th Battalion, Border Regiment (joined 5 May 1915, left for 151st Brigade on 20 December 1915)
- 149th Machine Gun Company (formed 6 February 1916, moved to 50th Battalion, Machine Gun Corps on 1 March 1918)
- 149th Trench Mortar Battery (formed 18 June 1916)

==== Units from July 1918 ====
- 3rd Battalion, Royal Fusiliers (joined 15 July 1918)
- 13th (Scottish Horse) Battalion, Black Watch (joined 15 July 1918)
- 2nd Battalion, Royal Dublin Fusiliers (joined 15 July 1918)
- 149th Trench Mortar Battery

=== Post-war ===
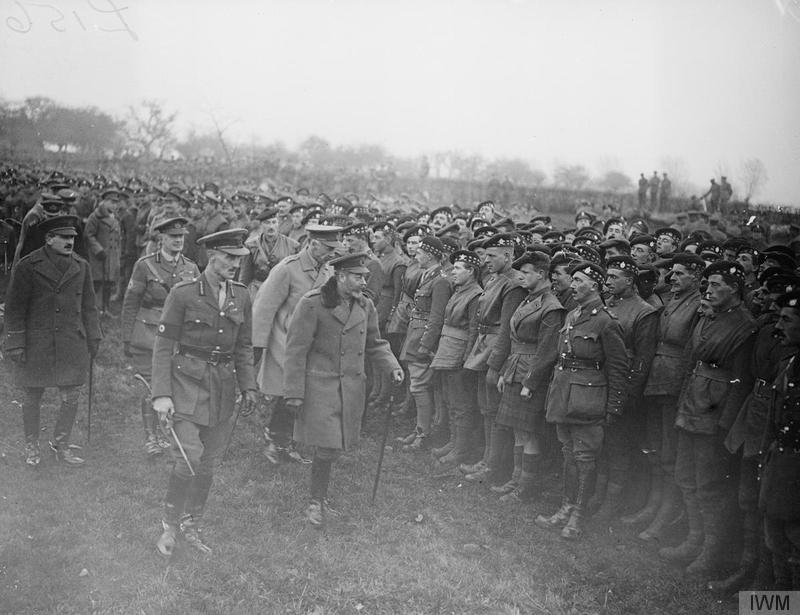
King George V inspecting the 149th Brigade, 50th Division, on the Maubeuge-Avesnes road, December 1918. He is passing the 13th (Scottish Horse Yeomanry) Battalion, Black Watch. With the king are General Rawlinson, Major-General Henry Jackson, GOC 50th Division, and Brigadier General Percy M. Robinson, the brigade' s GOC.

The 50th Division had crossed the Sambre and reached Solre-le-Château on 10 November 1918 when it was relieved. Demobilization started in December and by 19 March 1919 the division had ceased to exist in France.

The Northumbrian Division was reformed again in England on 1 April 1920 with the same composition as pre-war. The four original battalions were reformed in the Territorial Army on 7 February 1920.

Before the outbreak of the Second World War, the 50th (Northumbrian) Infantry Division was reorganized as a Motor Division which saw a reduction from three to two brigades.

- 4th Battalion, Royal Northumberland Fusiliers was converted to a motorcycle battalion in 1938, assigned to 50th Division.
- 5th Battalion, Royal Northumberland Fusiliers was converted to a searchlight battalion on 1 November 1938 as 5th Battalion, The Royal Northumberland Fusiliers (53rd Searchlight Regiment), assigned to 30th (Northumbrian) Anti-Aircraft Brigade.
- 6th Battalion, Royal Northumberland Fusiliers was converted to 43rd Battalion (6th (City) Battalion, The Royal Northumberland Fusiliers), Royal Tank Corps on 1 November 1938, assigned to 25th Army Tank Brigade.
- 7th Battalion, Royal Northumberland Fusiliers was converted to a machinegun battalion in Northumbrian Area, Northern Command and the brigade ceased to exist.

== General officers commanding ==
Indent = acting command.

- 3 July 1911 – 26 April 1915: Brigadier-General James Foster Riddell (killed in action)

- 26 April 1915: Lieutenant-Colonel Alfred James Foster
- 26 April – 27 April 1915: Lieutenant-Colonel A. H. Coles

- 27 April – 29 June 1915: Brigadier-General Geoffrey Feilding
- 29 June 1915 – 11 September 1916: Brigadier-General Henry Clifford (killed in action)

- 11 September – 14 September 1916: Lieutenant-Colonel Canning Turner

- 14 September 1916 – 6 March 1917: Brigadier-General Robert Montgomery Ovens

- 6 March – 10 March 1917: Lieutenant-Colonel George Scott-Jackson

- 10 March – 17 August 1917: Brigadier-General Hubert Conway Rees (invalided out)

- 17 August – 2 October 1917: Lieutenant-Colonel George Scott-Jackson

- 2 October 1917 – 27 May 1918: Brigadier-General Edward Pius Arthur Riddell (wounded in action)

- 27 May – 3 June 1918: Major Ivan Marshall Tweedy
- 3 June – 7 June 1918: Lieutenant-Colonel Leslie Duncan Scott

- 7 June 1918 – : Brigadier-General Percy Morris Robinson

== See also ==
- 188th (2/1st Northumberland) Brigade for the 2nd Line formation
- British infantry brigades of the First World War

== Bibliography ==
- Becke, Archibald F. (1936). Order of Battle of Divisions Part 2A. The Territorial Force Mounted Divisions and the 1st-Line Territorial Force Divisions (42–56). London: HMSO. OCLC 4405016.
- James, Brigadier E.A. (1978). British Regiments 1914–18. London: Samson Books Limited. ISBN 0-906304-03-2.
- Joslen, Lt-Col H.F. (1990) [1st. Pub. HMSO:1960]. Orders of Battle, Second World War, 1939–1945. London: London Stamp Exchange. ISBN 0-948130-03-2.
- Westlake, Ray (1986). The Territorial Battalions, A Pictorial History, 1859–1985. Tunbridge Wells: Spellmount.
