= 1st Guards Brigade (United Kingdom) =

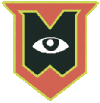
- Guards Division Insignia.
- Active: 20 August 1915 – 1919
- Country: United Kingdom
- Branch: British Army
- Type: Infantry
- Size: Brigade
- Part of: Guards Division
- Engagements: First World War Battle of Loos Battle of the Somme Battle of Passchendaele Battle of Cambrai (1917) First Battles of the Somme Second Battles of the Somme Second Battle of Arras Battles of the Hindenburg Line Final Advance in Picardy

Commanders
- Notable commanders: George Jeffreys

The 1st Guards Brigade was an infantry brigade of the British Army, formed in the First World War. It was formed in August 1915 by the redesignation of the 4th (Guards) Brigade on its transfer from the 2nd Division to the Guards Division. It served with the Guards Division on the Western Front for the rest of the war.

== History ==
=== 4th (Guards) Brigade ===
The 4th Brigade was an infantry brigade of the British Army with a history that stretched back to the Napoleonic Wars. At the outbreak of World War I in August 1914, the 4th Brigade was a regular army formation stationed in London District and assigned to the 2nd Division. It was designated as 4th (Guards) Brigade as it commanded four battalions of Foot Guards.

The brigade was among the first British formations to be sent overseas as part of the British Expeditionary Force (BEF), crossing to France between 11 and 16 August 1914. It served on the Western Front in 1914 and 1915 taking part in the Battle of Mons (23 and 24 August 1914), the First Battle of the Marne (6 – 9 September), the First Battle of the Aisne (13 – 20 September), the First Battle of Ypres (19 October – 30 November), and the Battle of Festubert (15 – 20 May 1915).

=== Formation ===
On 19 August 1915, the brigade was transferred complete to the newly formed Guards Division and redesignated as 1st Guards Brigade the next day. It remained with the division for the rest of the war, serving exclusively on the Western Front.

=== War service ===
In September 1915, the brigade took part in the Battle of Loos (26 September – 8 October) and Hohenzollern Redoubt (18 – 19 October). In 1916, it fought in the later stages of the Battle of the Somme, in particular the Battle of Flers–Courcelette (15 – 16 and 20 – 22 September), the Battle of Morval (25 – 28 September), and the Capture of Lesboeufs (25 September). In 1917, it saw action in the Battle of Passchendaele including the Battle of Pilckem Ridge (31 July – 2 August), the Battle of Poelcappelle (9 October), and the First Battle of Passchendaele (12 October). It then took part in the Battle of Cambrai (24 November – 3 December).

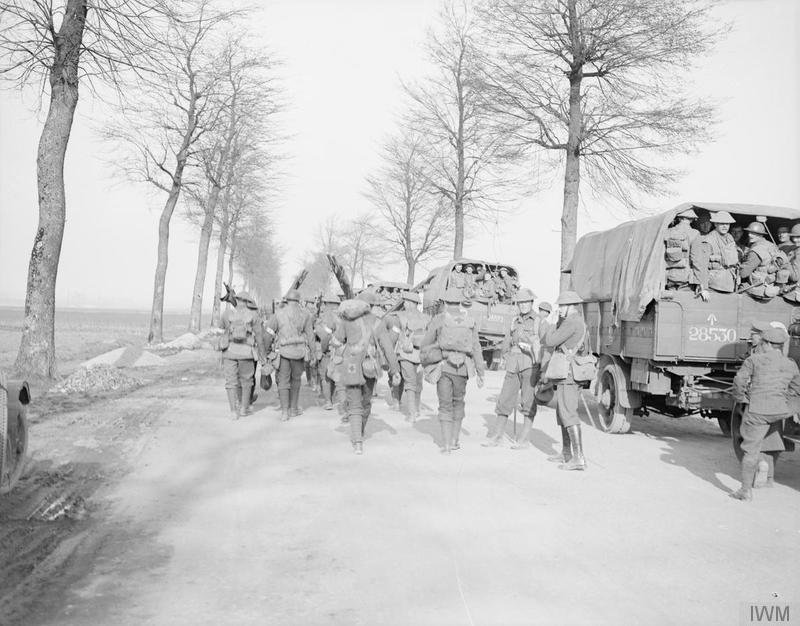
Stretcher bearers passing by motor lorries of the 2nd Battalion, Grenadier Guards, near Arras, France, 22 March 1918.

In February 1918, British (Note: As distinct from the Canadian and the New Zealand divisions which remained on a 12-battalion basis.) divisions on the Western Front were reduced from a 12-battalion to a 9-battalion basis (brigades from four to three battalions). As a result, the 4th Guards Brigade was formed on 8 February 1918 by taking a battalion from each of the brigades of the Guards Division and the 1st Guards Brigade lost the 3rd Battalion, Coldstream Guards. (Note: 4th Guards Brigade also gained the 2nd Battalion, Irish Guards from the 2nd Guards Brigade and the 4th Battalion, Grenadier Guards from the 3rd Guards Brigade.)

1918 saw the return of the war of movement. It had to withstand the German Army's Spring Offensive in the First Battles of the Somme (1 – 25 March) then switched over to counter-attack in the Second Battles of the Somme (21 – 23 August), the Second Battle of Arras (26 August – 3 September), the Battles of the Hindenburg Line (12 September – 12 October), and in the Final Advance in Picardy including the battles of the Selle and of the Sambre. Its final action was the Capture of Maubeuge on 9 November.

=== Post-war ===
After the signing of the Armistice of 11 November 1918, the brigade was at Assevent, north-east of Maubeuge, and on 17 November it regained 3rd Battalion, Coldstream Guards from the disbanding 4th Guards Brigade. The next day it began the march on Germany and crossed the frontier on 11 December. By 19 December it had reached the Cologne area. Battalions started returning to England on 20 February 1919 and the last units had completed the move by 29 April.

== Order of battle ==
The following units served in the brigade:

- 2nd Battalion, Grenadier Guards
- 2nd Battalion, Coldstream Guards
- 3rd Battalion, Coldstream Guards (joined the 4th Guards Brigade on 8 February 1918, returned on 17 November 1918)
- 1st Battalion, Irish Guards
- 1st Guards Brigade Machine Gun Company (formed 1–19 September 1915; joined the 4th Battalion, Machine Gun Guards on 1 March 1918)
- 1st Guards Trench Mortar Battery (formed 2–18 May 1916)

== Commanders ==
The brigade had the following commanders:

From	Name	Notes
29 June 1915	Brigadier General G.P.T. Feilding	wounded, 8 December 1915 (Note: Brigadier General G.P.T. Fielding was in command of the 4th (Guards) Brigade before it was redesignated as 1st Guards Brigade.)
8 December 1915	Lieutenant Colonel G.D. Jeffreys	acting
13 December 1915	Brigadier-General G.P.T. Feilding	invalided for treatment, 15 December 1915
15 December 1915	Lieutenant-Colonel G.D. Jeffreys	acting
9 January 1916	Brigadier-General C.E. Pereira	
31 December 1916	Brigadier-General G.D. Jeffreys	
22 September 1917	Brigadier-General C.R. Champion de Crespigny	

== Bibliography ==
- Becke, Major A.F. (1989) [1935]. Order of Battle of Divisions Part 1. The Regular British Divisions. London: His Majesty's Stationery Office. ISBN 1-871167-09-4.
- James, Brigadier E.A. (1978). British Regiments 1914–18. London: Samson Books Limited. ISBN 0-906304-03-2.
