= 4th Infantry Brigade (United Kingdom) =

British Army combat formation

The 4th Infantry Brigade was an infantry brigade of the British Army that served in both First and Second World Wars. During both world wars, it was part of the 2nd Infantry Division.

== History ==
As the Second Boer War ended in 1902 the army was restructured, and a 2nd Infantry division was established permanently as part of the 1st Army Corps, comprising the 3rd and 4th Infantry Brigades.

=== First World War ===
The brigade served with the 2nd Infantry Division and was among the first British units to be sent overseas, shortly after the war began, as part of the British Expeditionary Force. At this time it was designated as 4th (Guards) Brigade as it commanded four battalions of Foot Guards. It served on the Western Front in 1914 and 1915 before being transferred to the Guards Division and redesignated as 1st Guards Brigade on 20 August 1915.

While with the 2nd Division, it took part in the Battle of Mons (23 and 24 August 1914), the First Battle of the Marne (6 – 9 September), the First Battle of the Aisne (13 – 20 September), the First Battle of Ypres (19 October – 30 November), and the Battle of Festubert (15 – 20 May 1915).

The brigade was not reformed during the war, instead it was replaced in 2nd Division by the 19th Infantry Brigade.

==== Composition ====
The following units formed the brigade:

- 2nd Battalion, Grenadier Guards
- 2nd Battalion, Coldstream Guards
- 3rd Battalion, Coldstream Guards
- 1st Battalion, Irish Guards
- 1/1st Battalion, Hertfordshire Regiment (from 20 November 1914, then to 6th Brigade 19 August 1915)

=== Second World War ===
A regular army formation, this brigade served in France in 1940 as part of the BEF, evacuated to England on 31 May 1940.

It remained in the United Kingdom until April 1942 when, with the rest of the 2nd Infantry Division, it was shipped to India to fight in the Burma Campaign until the end of the war in 1945.

During the war, three members of the brigade won the Victoria Cross, all members of the 2nd Royal Norfolks, all posthumously. They were George Gristock, John Niel Randle and George Arthur Knowland.

==== Composition ====
The following units served with 4th Infantry Brigade:

- 1st Battalion, Royal Scots (until 3 November 1942 and from 3 July 1943)
- 2nd Battalion, Royal Norfolk Regiment
- 1st Battalion, Border Regiment (until 4 May 1940)
- 1/8th Battalion, Lancashire Fusiliers (from 4 May 1940)

==== Battles ====
The brigade took part in the following actions:

- The Dyle
- St Omer-La Bassée
- Kohima
- Mandalay

== Commanders ==
Commanders of the brigade included:

- 1902–1903: Major-General Herbert Plumer

== Bibliography ==
- Becke, Archibald F. (1935). Order of Battle of Divisions Part 1–The Regular British Divisions. London: HMSO. OCLC 4405016.
- Joslen, H. F. (2003) [1960]. Orders of Battle: Second World War, 1939–1945. Uckfield, East Sussex: Naval and Military Press. ISBN 978-1-84342-474-1.
