= James Foster Riddell =

Brigadier-General James Foster Riddell
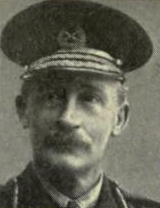
- Born: October 1861
- Died: 26 April 1915 (aged 53); St Julien, Belgium
- Burial place: Tyne Cot
- Alma mater: Wellington College, Berkshire
- Military career
- Allegiance: United Kingdom
- Branch: British Army
- Service years: 1880–1915
- Rank: Brigadier-General
- Unit: Northumberland Fusiliers
- Commands: 3rd Battalion, Northumberland Fusiliers; 2nd Battalion, Northumberland Fusiliers; 149th (Northumberland) Brigade
- Conflicts: First Hazara Expedition; Second Boer War; First World War; Western Front; Second Battle of Ypres †

Brigadier-General James Foster Riddell (October 1861 – 26 April 1915) was a British Army officer who was killed on the Western Front whilst in command of the 149th (Northumberland) Brigade.

== Military career ==
Riddell was commissioned into the British Army as a second lieutenant into the 5th Regiment of Foot (which later became the Northumberland Fusiliers and, later still, the Royal Northumberland Fusiliers) on 11 August 1880, and was promoted to lieutenant on 1 July 1881. He served in the Hazara Expedition of 1888, where he was mentioned in despatches, and the following year was promoted to captain on 27 January 1890, although this was later antedated to 18 November 1889.

In October 1899 the Second Boer War broke out between the United Kingdom and the Boer Republics in what is now South Africa. Riddell served with the 2nd Battalion of his regiment, now the Northumberland Fusiliers, which embarked for South Africa in November 1899 and was placed in a brigade under General Sir William Gatacre. Riddell took part in operations in Cape Colony, south of Orange River, from 1899 to 1900, during which he was promoted to major on 10 January 1900. He was appointed second-in-command of his battalion on 23 November 1901. The war ended with the Treaty of Vereeniging in June 1902, and the 2nd Battalion stayed in South Africa until January 1903, when Riddell commanded 357 officers and men who left Cape Town for home on the SS Aurania.

He was made a lieutenant colonel on 15 August 1904 and took command of a battalion of his regiment. He served as his battalion's commanding officer for four years, during which time he was promoted to brevet colonel on 15 August 1907. He relinquished command in August 1908 and then went on half-pay. He was advanced in rank to colonel on 10 February 1909.

In July 1911, after almost three years on half-pay, he reverted to normal pay and assumed command of the Northumberland Brigade, part of the Northumbrian Division, a Territorial Force formation, which was to be his final command.

He was promoted to the temporary rank of brigadier general on 5 August 1914, the day after the British entry into World War I. He led his brigade to the Western Front in April 1915, where he was killed.
