= 2nd Guards Brigade (United Kingdom) =

WW1 British Army formation

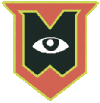
- Guards Division Insignia.
- Active: 26 August 1915 – post-war
- Country: United Kingdom
- Branch: British Army
- Type: Infantry
- Size: Brigade
- Part of: Guards Division
- Engagements: First World War Battle of Loos Battle of the Somme Battle of Passchendaele Battle of Cambrai (1917) First Battles of the Somme Second Battles of the Somme Second Battle of Arras Battles of the Hindenburg Line Final Advance in Picardy

Commanders
- Notable commanders: Andrew Thorne

The 2nd Guards Brigade was an infantry brigade of the British Army, formed in the First World War. It was formed in France in August 1915 with two Guards battalions already on the Continent and another two from England. It served with the Guards Division on the Western Front for the rest of the war.

== History ==
=== Formation ===
The 2nd Guards Brigade was formed at Lumbres, near St Omer, France between 19 and 25 August 1915. The 3rd Battalion, Grenadier Guards and 2nd Battalion, Irish Guards joined on 19 August from England and the 1st Battalion, Coldstream Guards and 1st Battalion, Scots Guards joined on 25 August from 1st (Guards) Brigade, 1st Division. The latter two battalions had been amongst the first British units to be sent overseas as part of the British Expeditionary Force, crossing to France between 11 and 15 August 1914. They served on the Western Front in 1914 and 1915 taking part in the Battle of Mons (23 and 24 August 1914), the First Battle of the Marne (6 – 9 September), the First Battle of the Aisne (13 – 26 September), the First Battle of Ypres (19 October – 15 November), and the Battle of Aubers Ridge (9 May 1915).

=== War service ===
In 1915, the brigade took part in the Battle of Loos (26 September – 8 October) and Hohenzollern Redoubt (18 – 19 October). In 1916, it fought in the later stages of the Battle of the Somme, in particular the Battle of Flers–Courcelette (15 – 16 and 20 – 22 September), the Battle of Morval (25 – 28 September), and the Capture of Lesboeufs (25 September). In 1917, it saw action in the Third Battle of Ypres including the Battle of Pilckem Ridge (31 August – 2 July), the Battle of Poelcappelle (9 October), and the First Battle of Passchendaele (12 October). It then took part in the Battle of Cambrai (24 November – 3 December).

In February 1918, British (Note: As distinct from the Australian, Canadian and the New Zealand divisions which remained on a 12-battalion basis.) divisions on the Western Front were reduced from a 12-battalion to a 9-battalion basis (brigades from four to three battalions). As a result, the 4th Guards Brigade was formed on 8 February 1918 by taking a battalion from each of the brigades of the Guards Division and the 2nd Guards Brigade lost the 2nd Battalion, Irish Guards. (Note: 4th Guards Brigade also gained the 3rd Battalion, Coldstream Guards from the 1st Guards Brigade and the 4th Battalion, Grenadier Guards from the 3rd Guards Brigade.)

1918 saw the return of the war of movement. It had to withstand the German spring offensive in the First Battles of the Somme (1 – 25 March) then switched over to counter-attack in the Second Battles of the Somme (21 – 23 August), the Second Battle of Arras (26 August – 3 September), the Battles of the Hindenburg Line (12 September – 12 October), and in the Final Advance in Picardy including the battles of the Selle and of the Sambre. Its final action was the Capture of Maubeuge on 9 November.

=== Post-war ===
At the Armistice, the brigade was near Maubeuge, and on 17 November it regained 2nd Battalion, Irish Guards from the disbanding 4th Guards Brigade. The next day it began the march on Germany and crossed the frontier on 11 December. By 19 December it had reached the Cologne area. Battalions started returning to England on 20 February 1919 and the last units had completed the move by 29 April.

== Order of battle ==
The following units served in the brigade:

- 3rd Battalion, Grenadier Guards
- 1st Battalion, Coldstream Guards
- 1st Battalion, Scots Guards
- 2nd Battalion, Irish Guards (joined the 4th Guards Brigade on 8 February 1918, returned on 17 November 1918)
- 2nd Guards Brigade Machine Gun Company (formed 1–19 September 1915; joined the 4th Battalion, Machine Gun Guards on 1 March 1918)
- 2nd Guards Trench Mortar Battery (formed April 1916)

== Commanders ==
The brigade had the following commanders:

| From | Name | Notes |
|---|---|---|
| 26 August 1915 | Brigadier-General J. Ponsonby | |
| 19 November 1916 | Brigadier-General Lord H.C. Seymour | |
| 21 March 1917 | Brigadier-General J. Ponsonby | |
| 22 August 1917 | Brigadier-General B.N. Sergison-Brooke | wounded, 23 March 1918 |
| 23 March 1918 | Lieutenant-Colonel G.B.S. Follett | acting |
| 25 March 1918 | Brigadier-General G.B.S. Follett | |
| 22 April 1918 | Lieutenant-Colonel A.F.A.N. Thorne | acting |
| 25 April 1918 | Brigadier-General B.N. Sergison-Brooke | |

== Bibliography ==
- Becke, Major A.F. (1989). Order of Battle of Divisions, Part 1. History of the Great War (Reprint ed.). Ray Westlake Military Books. ISBN 1-871167-09-4.
- James, Brigadier E.A. (1978). British Regiments 1914–18. London: Samson Books Limited. ISBN 0-906304-03-2.
