= David Douglas, 12th Marquess of Queensberry =

Anglo-Scottish aristocrat and pottery designer (1929–2026)

The Most Honourable The Marquess of Queensberry

Personal details
- Born: 19 December 1929 London, England
- Died: 22 July 2026 (aged 96)
- Spouses: Ann Jones (m. 1956; div. 1969) Alexandra Sich (m. 1969; div. 1986) Hsueh-Chun Liao (m. 2000)
- Children: 8
- Parent(s): Francis Douglas, 11th Marquess of Queensberry; Cathleen Sabine Mann
- Education: Eton College

David Harrington Angus Douglas, 12th Marquess of Queensberry (19 December 1929 – 22 July 2026) was an Anglo-Scottish aristocrat and pottery designer. He was the elder son of Francis Douglas, 11th Marquess of Queensberry, and his only son by his second wife, artist Cathleen Sabine Mann (married 1926 – divorced 1946). His maternal grandparents were an interior decorator, Dolly Mann (née Florence Sabine-Pasley) and artist Harrington Mann. He succeeded his father in 1954.

== Early life and education ==
David Harrington Angus Douglas was born in London on 19 December 1929. He was educated at Ashbury College Ottawa and Eton College.

== Career ==
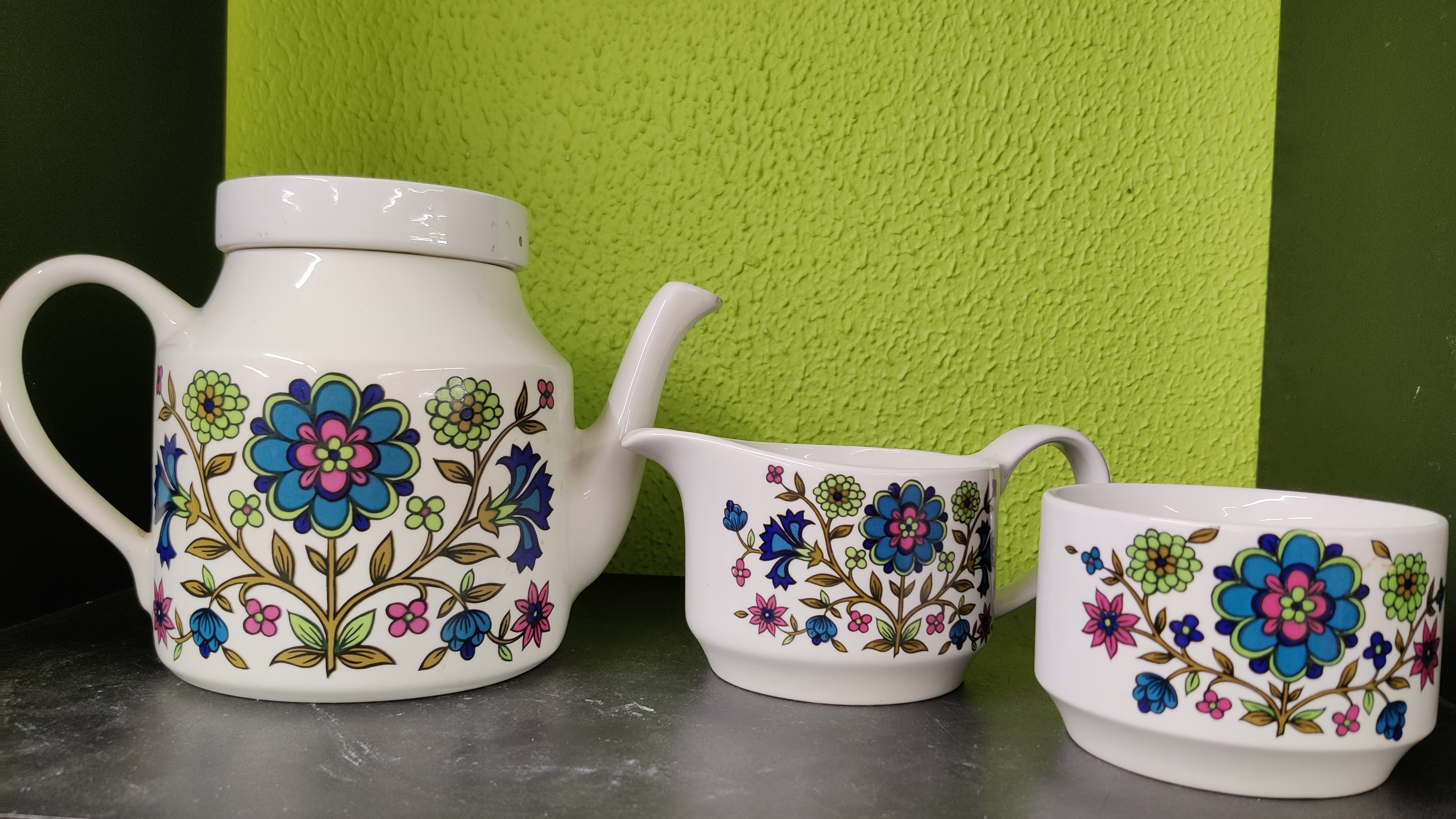
Midwinter 'Country Garden' tableware, using graphics designed by Jessie Tait on shapes designed by Queensberry

Douglas served in the Royal Horse Guards. In the 1950s he worked in the pottery industry. He was Professor of Ceramics at the Royal College of Art from 1959 to 1983. He belonged to the Crafts Council, was President of the Design and Industries Association from 1976 to 1978, was a Fellow of the Chartered Society of Designers (and recipient of the Minerva Medal, the Society's highest award), and was Senior Fellow of the Royal College of Art from 1990, and Professor of Ceramics there.

=== Membership of House of Lords ===
When Queensberry succeeded to his peerages in 1954, he didn't become a member of the House of Lords, the upper house of the Parliament of the United Kingdom, because he was a Peer of Scotland but he became it after the Peerage Act 1963 when all Scottish Peers were given seats in the House. This right was lost under the House of Lords Act 1999 which as from November 1999 reduced the number of hereditary peers with seats in the Lords from several hundred to only ninety-two, most elected from the peers' own ranks.

==== Views on LGBT issues ====
As a hereditary peer, Queensberry spoke in the House of Lords during the passage of the Sexual Offences Act 1967, which legalised homosexual acts in England and Wales. In 2016 he drew a contrast between his views on homosexuality and those of his great-grandfather John Douglas, 9th Marquess of Queensberry, well known for his role in the downfall of the Irish author and playwright Oscar Wilde. The 12th Marquess explained that he had been delighted to associate his family with a liberalising measure because the Queensberry name "had become so associated with the way Oscar Wilde was pilloried in 1895".

== Personal life and death ==
Queensberry was married three times: first in 1956 (div 1969) to Ann Jones (the actress Ann Queensberry), by whom he had two daughters; second in 1969 (div 1986) to Alexandra "Lexa" Mary Clare Wyndham Sich (daughter of Guy Wyndham Sich and Jean Denise Theobald), by whom he had three sons (the eldest born during his first marriage) and one daughter; and third in 2000 to Hsueh-Chun Liao (廖雪君), by whom he had a daughter, legitimated by marriage (d. 2018).

Issue:

- Lady Emma Cathleen Douglas (b. 1956) married 1986 Damon Lewis Vincent Heath, and has issue
- (illegitimate) Ambrose Jonathan Carey (b. 1961), see below
- Lady Alice Douglas (b. 1965) married 1stly 1989 (div) Ali Ugan; md 2ndly 1995 (div) Simon Melia, and has surviving issue, a daughter named Hero and a son named Tybalt.
- Sholto Francis Guy Douglas, 13th Marquess of Queensberry (born 1 June 1967), legitimated by decision of Lord Lyon when his parents married
- Lady Kate Cordelia Sasha Douglas (b. 1969) married 1999 Tom Weisselberg, and has issue
- Lord Milo Luke Dickon Douglas (1975–2009)
- Lord Torquil Oberon Tobias Douglas (b. 1978)
- Lady Beth Shan Ling Douglas (1999–2018), legitimised later in 2000 by her parents' marriage

His eldest but illegitimate son, Ambrose Jonathan Carey (b. 1961), is head of a British security and intelligence firm. His half-sister Caroline Carey (b. 1959), an English art student, married Salem bin Laden, prior head of the global Bin Laden family corporation. Ambrose Carey has been married since 1995 to Christina Weir, a daughter of Sir Michael Scott Weir and his first wife, Alison Walker. They have two sons, Angus Carey-Douglas and James Carey-Douglas. As Ambrose is illegitimate, he and his two sons are not in remainder to the Marquessate and subsidiary titles.

Queensberry had several siblings. By his father's first wife, he has an elder half-sister, Lady Patricia Douglas, whose daughter Countess Emma de Bendern was the first wife of gossip columnist Nigel Dempster. He had a late sister, Lady Jane Cory-Wright (1926–2007), twice married to David Arthur Cory-Wright, of the Cory-Wright baronets. He had a younger half-brother, Lord Gawain Douglas (born 1948), who is married with issue, one son and five daughters.

Queensberry died on 22 July 2026, at the age of 96.

Peerage of Scotland
Preceded by Francis Douglas	Marquess of Queensberry; 1954–2026	Succeeded by Sholto Douglas
