= 3rd Guards Brigade (United Kingdom) =

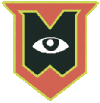
- Guards Division insignia
- Active: 15 August 1915 – post-war
- Country: United Kingdom
- Branch: British Army
- Type: Infantry
- Size: Brigade
- Part of: Guards Division
- Engagements: World War I Battle of Loos Battle of the Somme Third Battle of Ypres Battle of Cambrai (1917) First Battles of the Somme Second Battles of the Somme Second Battle of Arras Battles of the Hindenburg Line Final Advance in Picardy

Commanders
- Notable commanders: Charles Corkran

The 3rd Guards Brigade was an infantry brigade of the British Army in World War I. It was formed in France in August 1915 with two battalions already on the Continent and another two from England. It served with the Guards Division on the Western Front for the rest of the war.

== History ==
=== Formation ===
The 3rd Guards Brigade was formed at Lumbres, near St Omer, France on 15 August 1915. The 4th Battalion, Grenadier Guards and 1st Battalion, Welsh Guards joined on 18 and 20 August, respectively, from England and the 1st Battalion, Grenadier Guards and 2nd Battalion, Scots Guards joined on 5 and 8 August from 20th Brigade, 7th Division. The latter two battalions had been in Belgium and France from 5 October 1914 with the British Expeditionary Force. They served on the Western Front in 1914 and 1915 taking part in the First Battle of Ypres (19 October – 5 November 1914), the Battle of Neuve Chapelle (10 – 13 March 1915), the Battle of Aubers Ridge (9 May), the Battle of Festubert (15 – 19 May), and the Battle of Givenchy (15 and 16 June).

=== War service ===
In 1915, the brigade took part in the Battle of Loos (26 September – 8 October) and Hohenzollern Redoubt (18 – 19 October). In 1916, it fought in the later stages of the Battle of the Somme, in particular the Battle of Flers–Courcelette (15 – 16 and 20 – 22 September), the Battle of Morval (25 – 28 September), and the Capture of Lesboeufs (25 September). In 1917, it saw action in the Third Battle of Ypres including the Battle of Pilckem Ridge (31 August – 2 July), the Battle of Poelcappelle (9 October), and the First Battle of Passchendaele (12 October). It then took part in the Battle of Cambrai (24 November – 3 December).

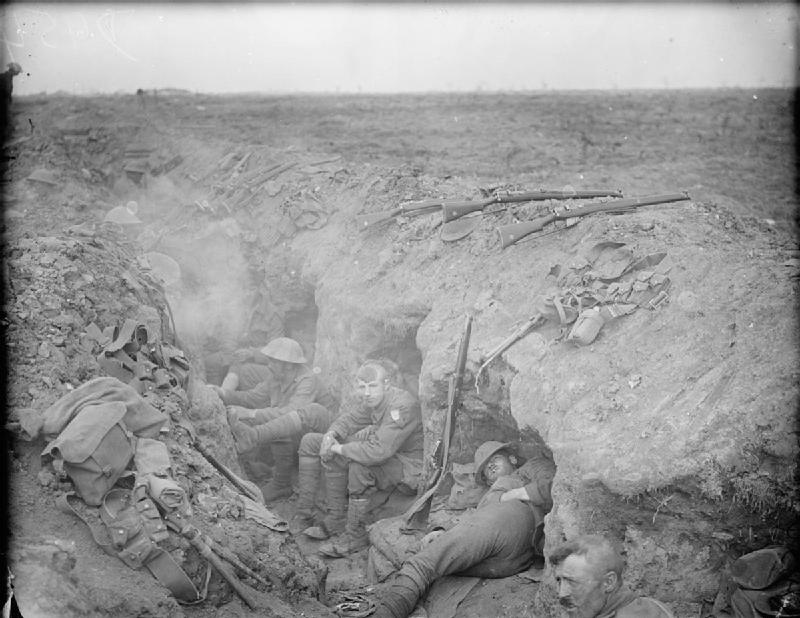
Men of the 1st Battalion, Welsh Guards resting in a reserve trench near Guillemont, France, during the Battle of the Somme, 3 September 1916.

In February 1918, British (Note: As distinct from the Australian, Canadian and the New Zealand divisions which remained on a 12-battalion basis.) divisions on the Western Front were reduced from a 12-battalion to a 9-battalion basis (brigades from four to three battalions). As a result, the 4th Guards Brigade was formed on 8 February 1918 by taking a battalion from each of the brigades of the Guards Division and the 3rd Guards Brigade lost the 4th Battalion, Grenadier Guards. (Note: 4th Guards Brigade also gained the 3rd Battalion, Coldstream Guards from the 1st Guards Brigade and the 2nd Battalion, Irish Guards from the 2nd Guards Brigade.)

The latter half of the year of 1918 saw the return of the war of movement. The 3rd Guards Brigade had to withstand the German spring offensive in the First Battles of the Somme (1 – 25 March) then switched over to counter-attack in the Second Battles of the Somme (21 – 23 August), the Second Battle of Arras (26 August – 3 September), the Battles of the Hindenburg Line (12 September – 12 October), and in the Final Advance in Picardy including the battles of the Selle and of the Sambre. Its final action was the Capture of Maubeuge on 9 November.

=== Post-war ===
At the Armistice, the brigade was at Maubeuge, and on 17 November it regained 4th Battalion, Grenadier Guards from the disbanding 4th Guards Brigade. The next day it began the march on Germany and crossed the frontier on 11 December. By 19 December it had reached the Cologne area. Battalions started returning to England on 20 February 1919 and the last units had completed the move by 29 April.

== Order of battle ==
The following units served in the brigade:

- 1st Battalion, Grenadier Guards
- 4th Battalion, Grenadier Guards (joined the 4th Guards Brigade on 8 February 1918, returned on 17 November 1918)
- 2nd Battalion, Scots Guards
- 1st Battalion, Welsh Guards
- 3rd Guards Brigade Machine Gun Company (formed 1–19 September 1915; joined the 4th Battalion, Machine Gun Guards on 1 March 1918)
- 3rd Guards Trench Mortar Battery (formed by 24 March 1916)

== Commanders ==
The brigade had the following commanders:

From	Name	Notes
15 August 1915	Lieutenant-Colonel A.B.E. Cator	acting
18 August 1915	Brigadier-General F.J. Heyworth	killed, 9 May 1916
9 May 1916	Lieutenant-Colonel Lord H.C. Seymour	acting
13 May 1916	Lieutenant-Colonel W. Murray-Threipland	acting
19 May 1916	Brigadier-General C.E. Corkran	
21 March 1917	Brigadier-General Lord H.C. Seymour	
2 April 1918	Lieutenant-Colonel N.A. Orr-Ewing	acting
22 April 1918	Brigadier-General G.B.S. Follett	killed, 27 September 1918
28 September 1918	Lieutenant-Colonel J.C. Brand	acting
29 September 1918	Brigadier-General C.P. Heywood	wounded, 5 November 1918
Night 5/6 November 1918	Lieutenant-Colonel J.A. Stirling	acting
11 November 1918	Brigadier-General J.V. Campbell VC	

== Bibliography ==
- Becke, Archibald F. (1935). Order of Battle of Divisions Part 1–The Regular British Divisions. London: HMSO. OCLC 4405016.
- James, Brigadier E.A. (1978). British Regiments 1914–18. London: Samson Books Limited. ISBN 0-906304-03-2.
