= Francis Douglas, 11th Marquess of Queensberry =

Scottish soldier, stockbroker and author

The Most Honourable The Marquess of Queensberry
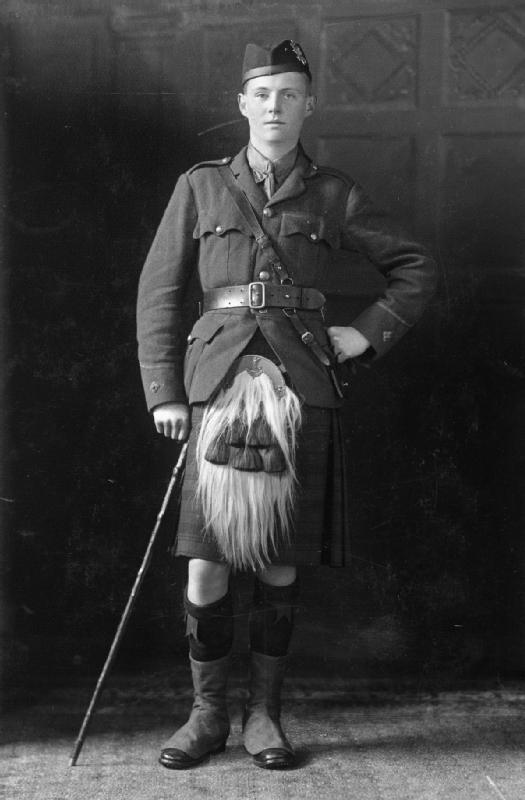
- Lord Queensberry, then Viscount Drumlanrig, during the First World War

Scottish representative peer in the House of Lords
- In office 16 November 1922 – 10 May 1929

Personal details
- Born: 17 January 1896 Kingston upon Thames, Surrey
- Died: 27 April 1954 (aged 58) Folkestone, Kent
- Spouses: Irene Richards (m. 1917; div. 1925); Cathleen Mann (m. 1926; div. 1946); Muriel Thornett (m. 1946)
- Children: Lady Patricia Sybil; David Douglas, 12th Marquess of Queensberry; Lady Jane Katherine; Lord Gawain Archibald
- Parents: Percy Douglas, 10th Marquess of Queensberry; Anna Maria Walters
- Education: Royal Military Academy Sandhurst
- Awards: 1914–15 Star; British War Medal; Victory Medal

Military service
- Allegiance: United Kingdom
- Branch/service: British Army
- Years of service: 1915–1919 (active), 1920–1927 (Territorial and Army Volunteer Reserve)
- Rank: Captain
- Unit: Royal Highlanders
- Conflict: World War I

Francis Archibald Kelhead Douglas, 11th Marquess of Queensberry (17 January 1896 – 27 April 1954), styled The Honourable Francis Douglas until 1900 and Viscount Drumlanrig between 1900 and 1920 was a Scottish soldier, stockbroker and author.

== Biography ==
Douglas was born in Kingston upon Thames, Surrey, the eldest son of Percy Sholto Douglas, 10th Marquess of Queensberry and his first wife, Anna Maria Walters (1866–1917).

He was educated at Harrow School and the Royal Military College, Sandhurst. He enlisted with the 2nd Battalion, Black Watch of the Royal Highlanders as a second lieutenant in January 1915. During the First World War he served on the Western Front and was promoted to lieutenant in October 1915 and to captain in November 1917. During his service, he suffered from severe appendicitis, diphtheria, and temporary paralysis. Following the recommendation of the Medical Board, he was granted permission by the War Office to travel to the United States during his leave in 1916. Upon his return to the Western Front he received a gunshot wound to the leg. He applied to relinquish his commission, on account of wounds received in action, in November 1919.

After the war he became a stockbroker, dealing mostly in gold and diamond shares from South Africa, and was a member of the London Stock Exchange.

Following the death of his father in 1920, he succeeded him as Marquess of Queensberry. From 1922 to 1929 he was a Scottish representative peer in the House of Lords.

In 1927, he resigned his commission from the Regular Army Reserve of Officers.

In 1938, Queensberry worked to establish a sport and recreation club at Earls Court, to provide a facility for working people that matched those of the upper class. Britain's entry into war with Germany in 1939 called for a change of plans. Closed since 1940 due to the Blitz, the Prince Edward Theatre re-opened in 1942 as the Queensberry All-Services Club, where servicemen and women could enjoy dancing, table tennis, billiards, chess, and variety shows. Queensberry himself actively supported the club by working in it as a receptionist and waiter.

He wrote two books relating to his family history: The Sporting Queensberrys (1942) and with Percy Colson, Oscar Wilde and the Black Douglas (1949). Just prior to his birth, his grandfather, John Douglas, 9th Marquess of Queensberry, had been the defendant in the notorious libel action brought by Oscar Wilde, ultimately leading to Wilde's imprisonment.

== Family ==
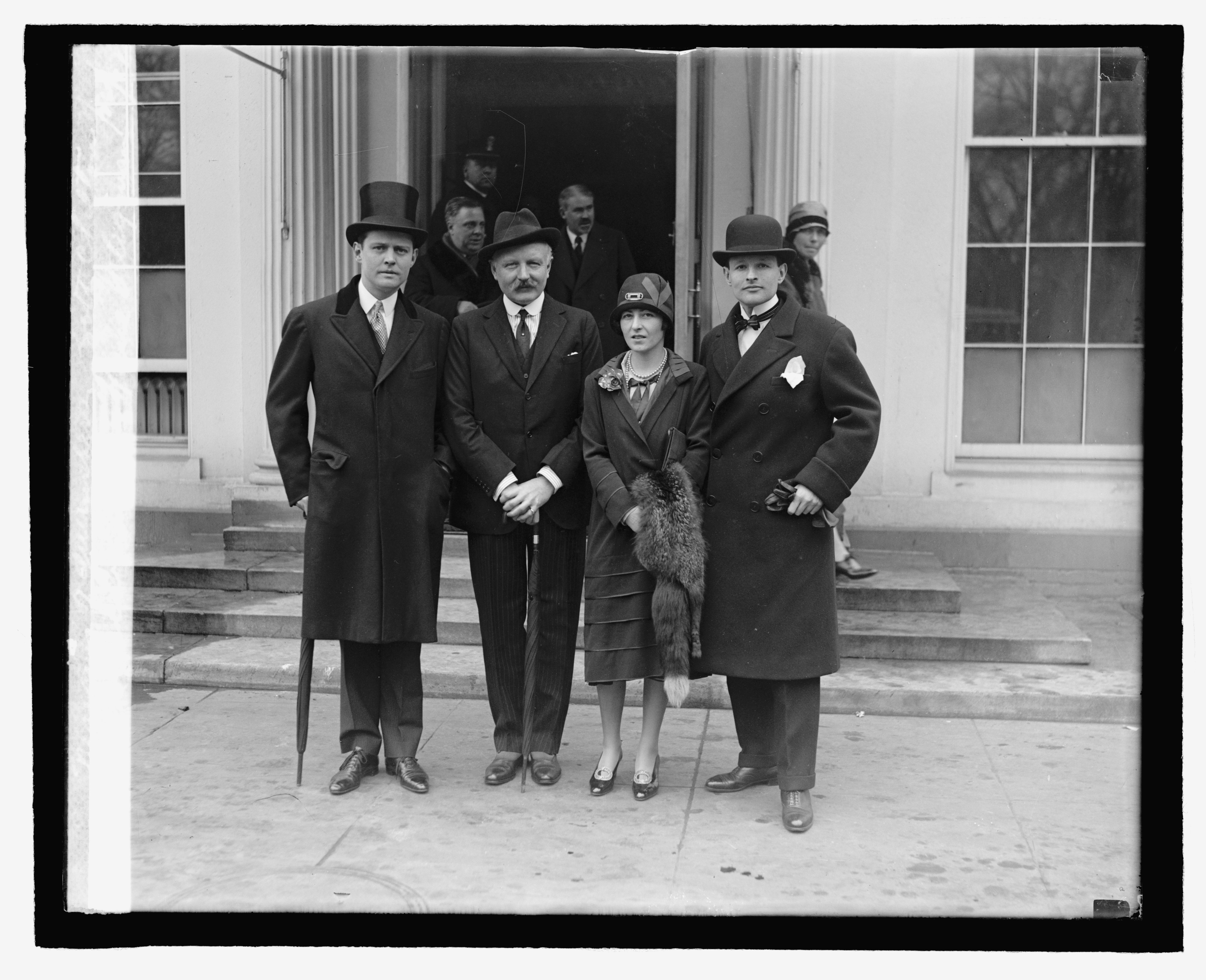
Douglas (left) at the White House in 1927.

Lord Queensberry was married three times. He married his first wife, Irene Clarice Richards (1899–1977), a musical comedy actress and the only daughter of Henry Williams Richards, of Salcombe, Devon on 4 December 1917. They had one daughter:

- Lady Patricia Sybil, born 24 December 1918. Married firstly in 1938 Count John Gerard de Bendern (divorced 1950), and secondly in 1950 (divorced 1960) Hermann Hornak.

The couple divorced in 1925. Irene remarried Sir James Dunn, 1st baronet, and became the mother of painter Anne Dunn.

His second wife was painter Cathleen Sabine Mann, daughter of portrait artist Harrington Mann (married 18 March 1926, divorced 1946). The couple had two children:

- Lady Jane Katherine, born 18 December 1926, married 1949 (divorced 1958) David Arthur Cory-Wright, of the Cory-Wright baronets
- David Douglas, 12th Marquess of Queensberry (19 December 1929−22 July 2026)

His third wife was Muriel Beatrice Margaret Chunn (known as "Mimi"), daughter of Arthur John Rowe Thornett of Monte Carlo, and former wife of Albert Sydney Gore Chunn. They married in 1947 and had one son:

- Lord Gawain Archibald Francis Douglas, born 23 May 1948

The Marquess died, aged 58, in 1954. His funeral was held at the Friary Church of St Francis and St Anthony, Crawley on 1 May with a requiem mass held 13 May at Farm Street Church in London.

His eldest son David, Viscount Drumlanrig, succeeded him as Marquess. The dowager Marchioness died in 1992.

Peerage of Scotland
Preceded by Percy Douglas	Marquess of Queensberry; 1920 – 1954	Succeeded by David Douglas
