= Ealing (constituency) =

Parliamentary constituency in the United Kingdom, 1885–1945

- Former borough constituency for the House of Commons
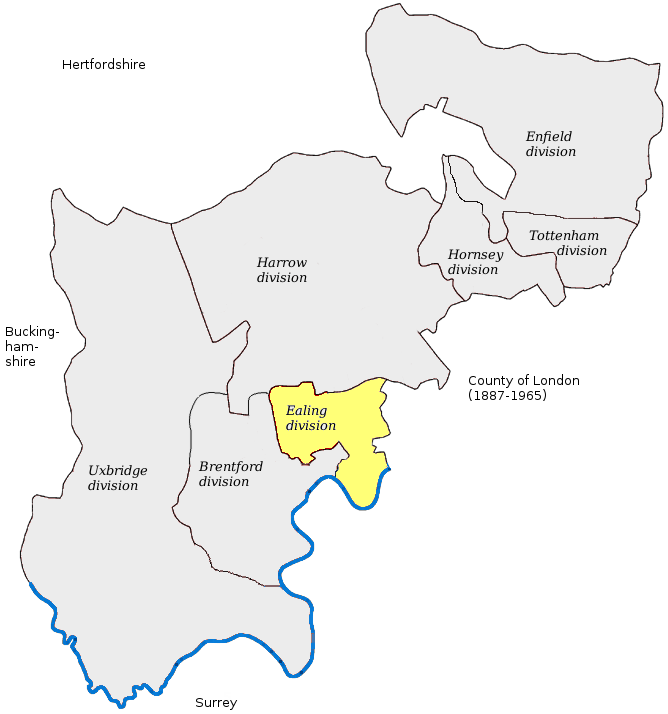
- Ealing 1885–1918

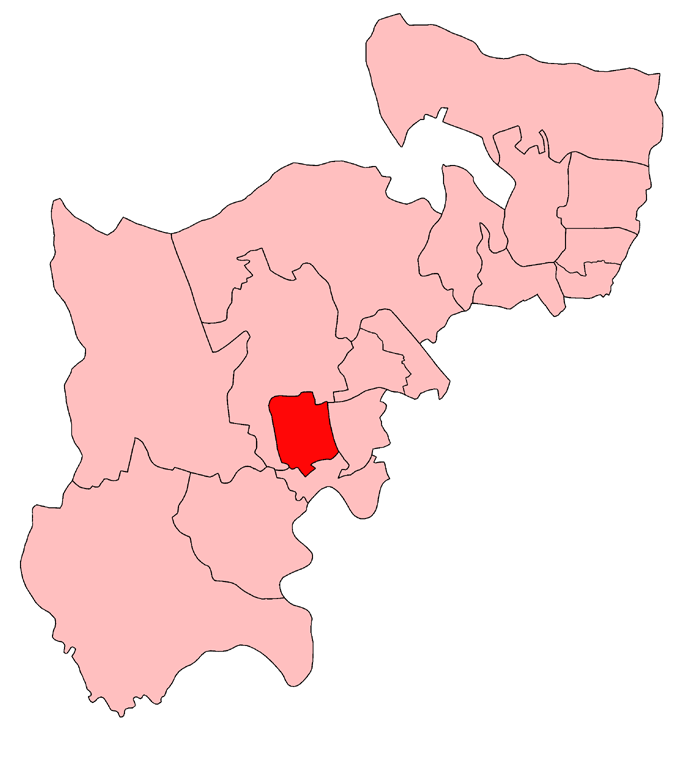
- Ealing 1918–1945

1885–1945
- Seats: one
- Created from: Middlesex
- Replaced by: Ealing East
- During its existence contributed to new seat(s) of: Brentford and Chiswick; Acton

Ealing was a parliamentary constituency centred on the Ealing district of west London. It returned one Member of Parliament (MP) to the House of Commons of the UK Parliament, 1885–1945. In common with metropolitan areas the seat saw major population increase. Until 1918 it included Chiswick, Acton within the County of London, and part of Hanwell in the rump of dwindling Middlesex.

== Boundaries ==
1885–1918: The civil parishes of Ealing, Acton, Greenford, Chiswick and Perivale and part of that of Hanwell.
1918–1945: The Municipal Borough of Ealing (as it stood in 1918, being Ealing, ignoring 1926 succession to the former urban districts of Greenford (including the parishes of Perivale and West Twyford) and Hanwell).

== History ==
The constituency was created by the Redistribution of Seats Act 1885 for the 1885 general election, and abolished for the 1945 general election. It was then replaced by the new Ealing East and Ealing West constituencies.

== Members of Parliament ==
Election	Member	Party
1885	Lord George Hamilton	Conservative
1906	Sir Herbert Nield	Conservative
1931	Sir Frank Sanderson	Conservative
1945	constituency abolished	

== Elections ==
=== Elections in the 1880s ===
Hamilton

General election 1885: Ealing
Party	Candidate	Votes	%	±%
Conservative	George Hamilton	4,353	61.8	
Liberal	William Bruce Gordon Hogg	2,691	38.2	
Majority		1,662	23.6	
Turnout		7,044	75.9	
Registered electors		9,283		
Conservative win (new seat)				

General election 1886: Ealing
Party	Candidate	Votes	%	±%
Conservative	George Hamilton	Unopposed		
Conservative hold				

Hamilton was appointed First Lord of the Admiralty, causing a by-election.

By-election, 12 August 1886: Ealing
Party	Candidate	Votes	%	±%
Conservative	George Hamilton	Unopposed		
Conservative hold				

=== Elections in the 1890s ===
General election 1892: Ealing
Party	Candidate	Votes	%	±%
Conservative	George Hamilton	5,547	72.4	N/A
Liberal	Stephen Holman	2,112	27.6	New
Majority		3,435	44.8	N/A
Turnout		7,659	63.4	N/A
Registered electors		12,081		
Conservative hold				

Hamilton is appointed Secretary of State for India, requiring a by-election.

Ealing by-election, 1895
Party	Candidate	Votes	%	±%
Conservative	George Hamilton	Unopposed		
Conservative hold				

General election 1895: Ealing
Party	Candidate	Votes	%	±%
Conservative	George Hamilton	Unopposed		
Conservative hold				

=== Elections in the 1900s ===
General election 1900: Ealing
Party	Candidate	Votes	%	±%
Conservative	George Hamilton	Unopposed		
Conservative hold				

Hutton

General election 1906: Ealing
Party	Candidate	Votes	%	±%
Conservative	Herbert Nield	8,261	54.2	N/A
Liberal	Arthur Hill Hutton	6,982	45.8	New
Majority		1,279	8.4	N/A
Turnout		15,243	74.6	N/A
Registered electors		20,436		
Conservative hold				

=== Elections in the 1910s ===
General election January 1910: Ealing
Party	Candidate	Votes	%	±%
Conservative	Herbert Nield	12,916	61.1	+6.9
Liberal	Maurice Charles Hulbert	8,210	38.9	−6.9
Majority		4,706	22.2	+13.8
Turnout		21,126	84.3	+9.7
Conservative hold		Swing	+6.9	

General election December 1910: Ealing
Party	Candidate	Votes	%	±%
Conservative	Herbert Nield	Unopposed		
Conservative hold				

General election 1914–15:

Another general election was required to take place before the end of 1915. The political parties had been making preparations for an election to take place and by July 1914, the following candidates had been selected;

- Unionist: Herbert Nield
- Liberal:

By-election, 1917: Ealing
Party	Candidate	Votes	%	±%
Unionist	Herbert Nield	Unopposed		
Unionist hold				

General election 1918: Ealing
Party		Candidate	Votes	%	±%
C	Unionist	Herbert Nield	13,710	79.2	N/A
	Labour	Alfred Chilton	3,610	20.8	New
Majority			10,100	58.4	N/A
Turnout			17,320	60.4	N/A
	Unionist hold				
C indicates candidate endorsed by the coalition government.

=== Elections in the 1920s ===
General election 1922: Ealing
Party	Candidate	Votes	%	±%
Unionist	Herbert Nield	14,507	67.9	−11.3
Labour	Alfred Chilton	6,128	28.7	+7.9
Ind. Unionist	Lewis Hall	719	3.4	New
Majority		8,379	39.2	−19.2
Turnout		21,354	65.8	+5.4
Unionist hold		Swing	-9.6	

General election 1923: Ealing
Party	Candidate	Votes	%	±%
Unionist	Herbert Nield	12,349	53.1	−14.8
Liberal	Alfred William Bradford	6,410	27.6	New
Labour	Alfred Chilton	4,495	19.3	−9.4
Majority		5,939	25.5	−13.7
Turnout		23,254	69.0	+3.2
Unionist hold		Swing		

General election 1924: Ealing
Party	Candidate	Votes	%	±%
Unionist	Herbert Nield	18,572	73.3	+20.2
Labour	Alfred Chilton	6,765	26.7	+7.4
Majority		11,807	46.6	+21.1
Turnout		25,337	73.2	+4.2
Unionist hold		Swing	+6.4	

General election 1929: Ealing
Party	Candidate	Votes	%	±%
Unionist	Herbert Nield	20,503	54.4	−18.9
Labour	James William Maycock	9,093	24.2	−2.5
Liberal	Arrean Paul Grundy	8,042	21.4	New
Majority		11,410	30.2	−16.4
Turnout		37,638	73.4	+1.2
Unionist hold		Swing	-8.2	

=== Elections in the 1930s ===
General election 1931: Ealing
Party	Candidate	Votes	%	±%
Conservative	Frank Sanderson	32,792	82.7	+28.3
Labour	James William Maycock	6,857	17.3	−6.9
Majority		25,935	65.4	+35.2
Turnout		39,649	74.6	+1.2
Conservative hold		Swing	+17.6	

General election 1935: Ealing
Party	Candidate	Votes	%	±%
Conservative	Frank Sanderson	28,472	74.1	−8.6
Labour	Mark Auliff	9,972	25.9	+8.6
Majority		18,500	48.2	−17.2
Turnout		38,444	69.1	−5.5
Conservative hold		Swing	-8.6	

General election 1939–40

Another general election was required to take place before the end of 1940. The political parties had been making preparations for an election to take place and by the Autumn of 1939, the following candidates had been selected;

- Conservative: Frank Sanderson
- Labour: D. J. Johnston
