= Hickman baronets of Wightwick (1903) =

Escutcheon of the Hickman baronets of Wightwick

The Hickman baronetcy, of Wightwick in the parish of Tettenhall in the County of Stafford, was created in the Baronetage of the United Kingdom on 25 August 1903 for the iron and steel manufacturer Alfred Hickman. He also represented Wolverhampton in the House of Commons as a Conservative.

== Hickman baronets, of Wightwick (1903) ==
- Sir Alfred Hickman, 1st Baronet (1830–1910)
- Sir Alfred Edward Hickman, 2nd Baronet (1885–1947)
- Sir (Alfred) Howard Whitby Hickman, 3rd Baronet (1920–1979)
- Sir (Richard) Glenn Hickman, 4th Baronet (born 1949)

The heir apparent is the present holder's son Charles Patrick Alfred Hickman (born 1983).

== Notes ==
Baronetage of the United Kingdom
Preceded by Cory-Wright baronets	Hickman baronets of Wightwick; 28 August 1903	Succeeded by Rasch baronets
