= Richard Cory-Wright =

British peer (born 1944)

Sir Richard Michael Cory-Wright, 4th Baronet (born 17 January 1944) is the 4th Baronet Cory-Wright.

Sir Richard is the son of Captain Anthony John Julian Cory-Wright (1916–1944) and Susan Esterel Elwes. Captain Cory-Wright was the oldest son of Sir Geoffrey Cory-Wright, the 3rd Baronet Baronet Cory-Wright. Captain Cory-Wright was killed in action on 26 June 1944, aged 27, at Saint-Manvieu, Normandy, in France, when Richard was only six months old. His mother remarried, in 1949, to Lt.-Col. Jocelyn Eustace Gurney.

Richard Cory-Wright was educated at Eton College. He graduated with a BSc degree from Birmingham University in 1965. Richard Cory-Wright gained the rank of Lieutenant in the Leicestershire and Derbyshire Yeomanry.

Richard Cory-Wright succeeded to the title of 4th Baronet Cory-Wright on 23 March 1969. He married Veronica Mary Bolton in 1976. Their children are: Roland Anthony Cory-Wright (born 1979); Jonathan James Cory-Wright (born 1981); and Felix Michael Cory-Wright (born 1986). They were divorced in 1994. Richard Cory-Wright married Helga Wright (née Godfrey) in 1998. They were divorced in 2025.

Baronetage of the United Kingdom
Preceded by Geoffrey Cory-Wright	Baronet (of Caen Wood Towers and Hornsey); 1969–present	Incumbent
