= Rasch baronets =

Baronetcy in the Baronetage of the United Kingdom

Escutcheon of the Rasch baronets of Woodhill (1903)

The Rasch Baronetcy, of Woodhill in Danbury in the County of Essex, is a title in the Baronetage of the United Kingdom. It was created on 29 August 1903 for Frederic Carne Rasch, Conservative Member of Parliament for South East Essex and Chelmsford.

He was succeeded in the baronetcy by his eldest son, also named Frederic but known as Carne, as the 2nd Baronet. He was a Colonel in the Army. On Sir Carne Rasch's death the title passed to his nephew, Richard Guy Carne Rasch, the 3rd Baronet. He was the son of Brigadier Guy Elland Carne Rasch, the younger son of the 1st Baronet and courtier. The 4th baronet, Sir Simon (Anthony Carne) Rasch, succeeded to the baronetcy in 1996.

== Rasch baronets, of Woodhill (1903) ==
- Sir Frederic Carne Rasch, 1st Baronet (1847–1914)
- Sir (Frederic) Carne Rasch, 2nd Baronet (1880–1963)
- Sir Richard Guy Carne Rasch, 3rd Baronet (1918–1996)
- Sir Simon Anthony Carne Rasch, 4th Baronet (born 1948)

The heir apparent is the present holder's son Toby Richard Carne Rasch (born 1994).

Baronetage of the United Kingdom
Preceded by Hickman baronets	Rasch baronets of Woodhill; 28 August 1903	Succeeded by Wilson-Todd baronets
