= 1917 Ealing by-election =

UK Parliamentary by-election

The 1917 Ealing by-election was held on 30 April 1917. The by-election was held due to the incumbent Conservative MP, Herbert Nield, becoming Recorder of York. It was retained by Nield.
