= Arthur Cory-Wright =

British businessman (1869–1951)

Sir Arthur Cory Cory-Wright, 2nd Baronet (18 November 1869 – 21 April 1951) was a British businessman.

He was the son of Sir Cory Francis Cory-Wright, 1st Baronet, and Mima Owen. He was educated at Harrow School and at Merton College, Oxford, where he graduated in 1891 with a BA and with an MA in 1896.

He was a Justice of the Peace (JP) for Middlesex and Hertfordshire. In 1892 he became a partner in the family firm of William Cory & Son, coal factors, steamship owners, etc., of London. At that time his father was the Company's senior partner. When William Cory & Son was floated as a limited liability company in 1896, Arthur Cory-Wright joined the Board of Directors when his father was elected its first Chairman. Arthur Cory-Wright became Chairman on the death of his father in 1909. He was also Chairman and Director of Messrs. Rickett, Cockerell & Co. Ltd., and several other companies involved in the coal trade. He succeeded to the title of 2nd Baronet Cory-Wright, of Caen Wood Towers, Highgate St. Pancras, co. London and Hornsey, co. Middlesex on the death of his father on 30 May 1909.

In 1919 he was a member of the Port of London Authority. He married Elizabeth Olive Clothier, daughter of Henry Clothier, on 18 November 1891. Cory-Wright was appointed High Sheriff of Hertfordshire for 1921.

Sir Arthur Cory-Wright died on 21 April 1951, aged 81. He was succeeded to the title of Baronet Cory-Wright by his son Geoffrey Cory-Wright.

Baronetage of the United Kingdom
Preceded by Cory Francis Cory-Wright	Baronet (of Caen Wood Towers and Hornsey); 1909–1951	Succeeded by Geoffrey Cory-Wright
