= Herbert Nield =

British politician (1862–1932)

Sir Herbert Nield PC, KC, DL (20 October 1862 – 11 October 1932) was a barrister and Conservative Party politician in the United Kingdom.

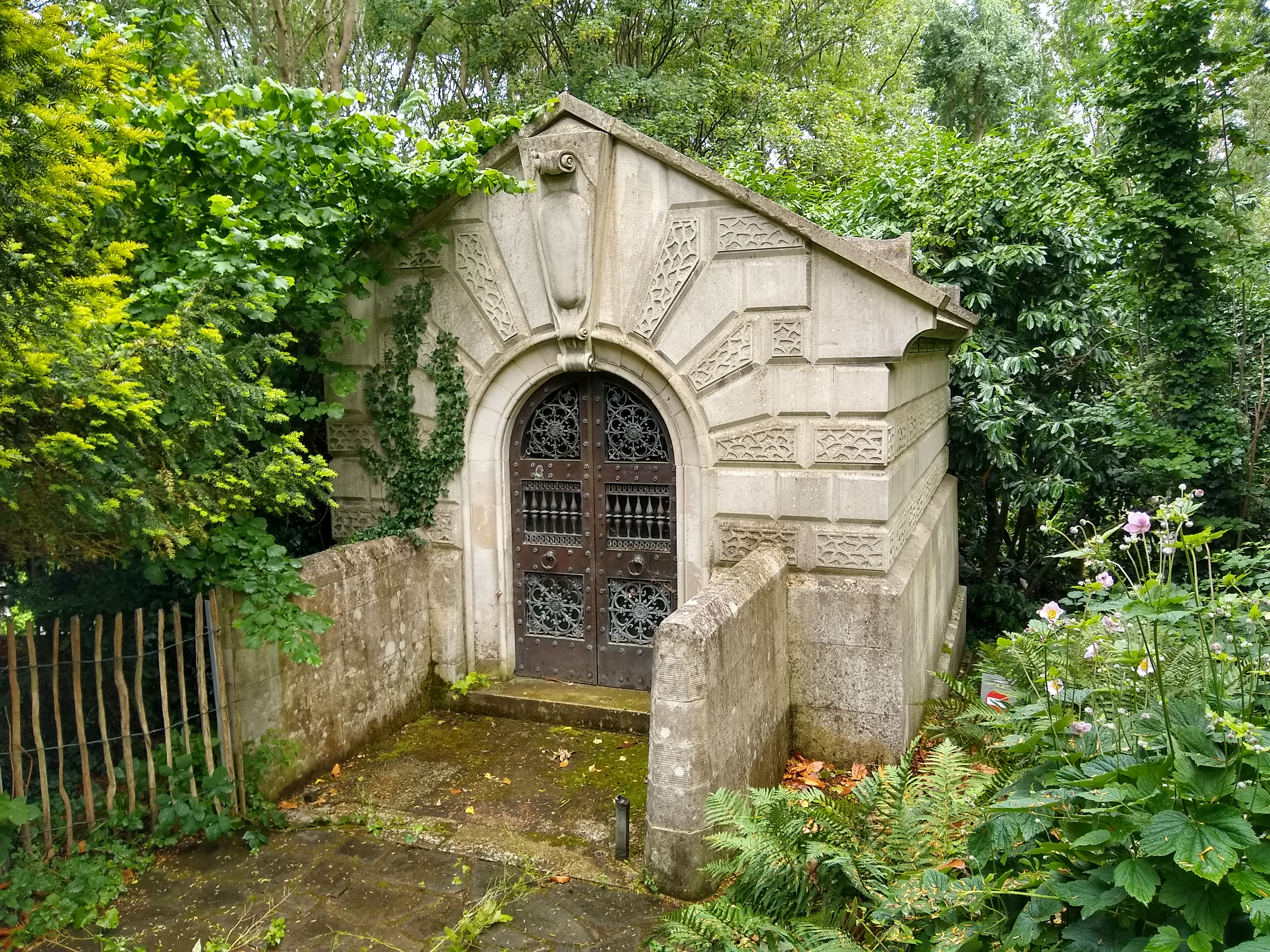
The Cory-Wright Mausoleum at Highgate Cemetery (West)

== Biography ==
Born in Saddleworth, Yorkshire, Nield was admitted a solicitor in 1885, called to the bar at the Inner Temple in 1895 and 'took silk' as a King's Counsel in 1913.

In 1895 he was elected to Middlesex County Council as a representative of Tottenham. In 1906 he was created a county alderman and remained a member of the council until his death.

Nield was elected as member of parliament (MP) for Ealing constituency at the 1906 general election, and held the seat until he retired from the House of Commons at the 1931 general election.

Appointed a deputy lieutenant of Middlesex in 1912, he was knighted in 1918 and later appointed as a Privy Councillor in 1924. He was a member of the London Survey Committee, a voluntary organisation publishing architectural surveys of the capital.

He was Recorder of York.

Nield was twice married. In 1890 he married Mary Catherine Baker of Colyton, Devon. She died in 1893 leaving one son who alter died in the First Battle of the Somme. His second wife was Mabel Owen, second daughter of Sir Francis Cory-Wright, 1st Baronet, with whom he had a second son.

He died on 11 October 1932 and his body was interred in the Cory-Wright Mausoleum on the western side of Highgate Cemetery.

Parliament of the United Kingdom
Preceded by Lord George Hamilton	Member of Parliament for Ealing; 1906–1931	Succeeded by Sir Frank Sanderson
