= Geoffrey Cory-Wright =

British baronet (1892–1969)

Sir Geoffrey Cory-Wright at his wedding to Felicity Tree in 1915

Sir Geoffrey Cory-Wright, 3rd Baronet (26 August 1892 – 23 March 1969) was the 3rd Baronet Cory-Wright.

== Biography ==
He was the son of Sir Arthur Cory Cory-Wright, 2nd Baronet, and Elizabeth Olive Clothier. He was educated at Harrow School, and at University College, Oxford. A Regular Officer, on 29 August 1914 he was promoted to Temporary Lieutenant. He fought in World War I, where he was wounded. He gained the rank of Captain in the 3rd Battalion, East Kent Regiment. He gained the rank of Flight Commander in the Royal Flying Corps. He succeeded to the title of 3rd Baronet Cory-Wright, of Caen Wood Towers, Highgate St. Pancras, Co. London and Hornsey, Co. Middlesex on the death of his father on 21 April 1951.

He married Felicity Tree, the daughter of actor Sir Herbert Beerbohm Tree, on 10 November 1915. Because of the celebrity of his father-in-law, the World War I wedding was filmed, showing the bride leaving with Sir Herbert Beerbohm Tree from the parental home and arriving at the church. Felicity Tree's two sisters are shown as bridesmaids with Lady Tree followed by the bride and Sir Herbert Beerbohm Tree. The bride and her father are shown entering the car, and the bride and groom leaving the church, posing for the camera. The couple went on to have five children. Two of his sons, Captain Anthony John Julian Cory-Wright (1916–1944) and Lieutenant Jonathan Francis Cory-Wright (1925–1945) were killed in action during World War II.

A photographer, 11 of his pictures were used to illustrate a book about Holkham Hall. In 1956 he and his collection of antique paperweights were featured in an advertising campaign for Passing Clouds cigarettes.

He was succeeded to the title by his grandson, Richard Cory-Wright.

Baronetage of the United Kingdom
Preceded by Arthur Cory Cory-Wright	Baronet (of Caen Wood Towers and Hornsey); 1951–1969	Succeeded by Richard Cory-Wright
