= Cathleen Mann =

English painter

- 1932 portrait by Madame Yevonde
- Born: Cathleen Sabine Mann; 31 December 1896; Newcastle upon Tyne
- Died: 9 September 1959 (aged 62); Brompton, London
- Spouses: Francis Douglas, 11th Marquess of Queensberry (m. 1926; div. 1946) John Follett (m. 1946; died 1953)
- Children: Lady Jane Katherine Douglas; David Douglas, 12th Marquess of Queensberry
- Parent(s): Harrington Mann; Florence Sabine Pasley

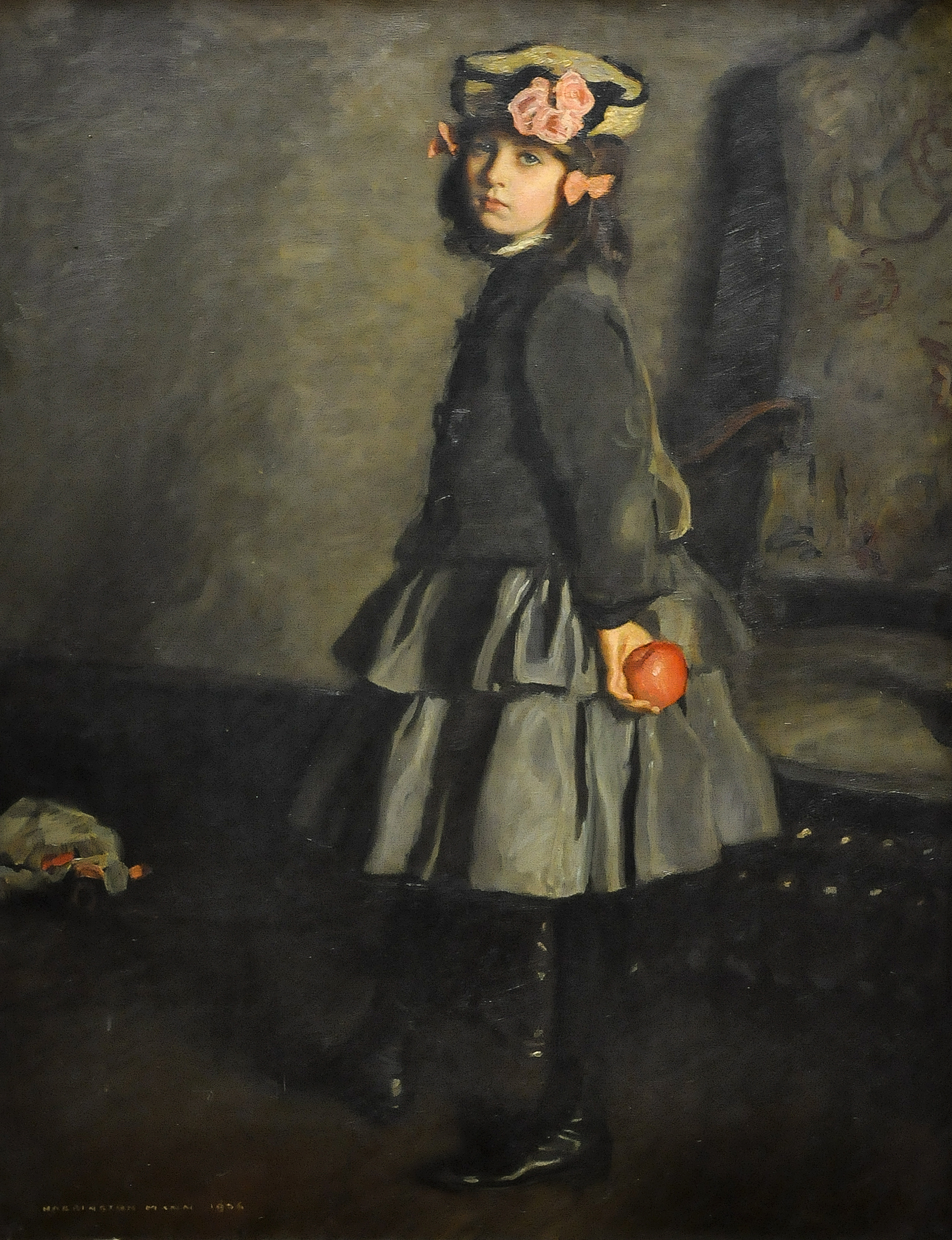
Cathleen (1906), painted by her father Harrington Mann at the Museum of Fine Arts, Ghent

Cathleen Sabine Mann RP ROI (31 December 1896 – 9 September 1959), styled the Marchioness of Queensberry from 1926 to 1946, was a British portrait painter and costume designer for film. She was a member of the Royal Institute of Oil Painters and the Royal Society of Portrait Painters.

== Family and career ==
Cathleen Mann was born in Newcastle upon Tyne on 31 December 1896 to the Scottish portrait painter Harrington Mann, the second of his three daughters. Her mother was the portraitist and interior director Florence Sabine Pasley. Harrington Mann gave Cathleen painting lessons in his London studio, as did the portrait painter Ethel Walker. Walker continued to tutor Mann even while Cathleen was studying at Slade School of Fine Art in London. Walker remained an influence on Mann and the two often exhibited in the same group exhibitions. Mann's art career was put on hold owing to the First World War, when she worked with an ambulance unit.

By 1924 Mann had two portraits in the Royal Academy, and exhibited there regularly from 1930. Her work was displayed at the Victoria and Albert Museum, the Musée du Luxembourg, and the Royal Glasgow Institute of the Fine Arts. Two of her portraits hang in the National Portrait Gallery: Sir Matthew Smith and Sir Eduardo Paolozzi (both oil on canvas, 1952). Mann eventually became a member of the Royal Institute of Oil Painters and the Royal Society of Portrait Painters.

During the 1930s Mann also engaged in costume design for British films. Her work included The Iron Duke (1935) starring George Arliss and Things to Come (1937) starring Raymond Massey. Mann donated some of her costume design drawings to the Victoria & Albert Museum, where they are on display.

== Later life ==
Mann married Francis Douglas, 11th Marquess of Queensberry on 18 March 1926, becoming his second wife. The marriage led some to refer to Mann as a "painting peeress", a term she disliked. She was known as the Marchioness of Queensberry until their divorce in 1946. They had two children, David Douglas, 12th Marquess of Queensberry and a daughter.

During the Second World War, Mann was an official war artist, painting portraits of officers such as Adrian Carton de Wiart and the Allied commanders. As well as being reproduced in magazines such as Time, these paintings were exhibited in London and then toured America.

In 1946, she married John Robert Follett, the son of Brigadier-General Gilbert Burrell Spencer Follett, who had been killed in action during the First World War, and Lady Mildred Follet, daughter of Charles Murray, 7th Earl of Dunmore. Follett was a racehorse owner, but died in 1953, aged 46, shortly before Francis Douglas also died. The two deaths seemed to have caused Mann to have a nervous breakdown, but it has been said that during this period she produced some of her best work, from landscapes and child portraits to sculpture and abstract paintings. She befriended the artist Matthew Smith and was influenced by his work. As a result, the Oxford Dictionary of National Biography opines that her best work occurred during the last ten years of her life. During this period she experimented with abstract art, drawings of nude models and sculpture.

Mann committed suicide in 1959 by taking an overdose of sleeping pills in her studio on Montpelier Walk, Brompton. Her son said she had recently been diagnosed with another attack of tuberculosis, although the doctor did not think it would be serious. She left a note stating that she was very worried about the illness. Following her death, this epitaph appeared in The Times:

Mr. H. Rowntree Clifford writes – "Many hundreds of people living in the dock district of south West Ham during the September bombing of 1940 owe their lives to the determination and courage of the late Cathleen Mann. As Marchioness of Queensberry she used her name and the strength of her personality to break through official difficulties and to commandeer transport by both road and rail to carry numbers of helpless and in some cases crippled people to safety. I remember the humble duty she offered to those who were deprived of their families."

== Filmography in costume design ==
- 1937: Backstage
- 1936: Forbidden Music
- 1936: Things to Come (credited as The Marchioness of Queensberry)
- 1936: The Show Goes On
- 1934: The Iron Duke
- 1934: Evensong
- 1934: Chu Chin Chow
- 1933: The Wandering Jew
