= Alfred Chilton =

British trade unionist and politician

Alfred Hugh Chilton (1877 – September 1931) was a British trade unionist and politician.

Born in Cirencester, Chilton began working as a porter for the Great Western Railway. He became a signalman, and joined what became the National Union of Railwaymen, serving as secretary of its West Ealing No 1 Branch for seven years. He also became active in the Labour Party, winning the party's first seat on Ealing Town Council, in Lammas ward, in 1917. The following year, the Ealing Labour Party was formed, and Chilton became its first president.

At the 1918, 1922, 1923 and 1924 UK general elections, Chilton stood in Ealing, but always took less than 30% of the vote. He then moved to contest Windsor at the 1929 UK general election, but fared worse, with just 11.3% of the vote.

By 1931, Chilton was in poor health, and found a less strenuous job as station foreman at Ealing Broadway railway station. However, in September, he died in an accident at the station.
