= Percy Douglas, 10th Marquess of Queensberry =

Scottish aristocrat (1868–1920)

The Most Honourable Percy Sholto Douglas 10th Marquess of Queensberry
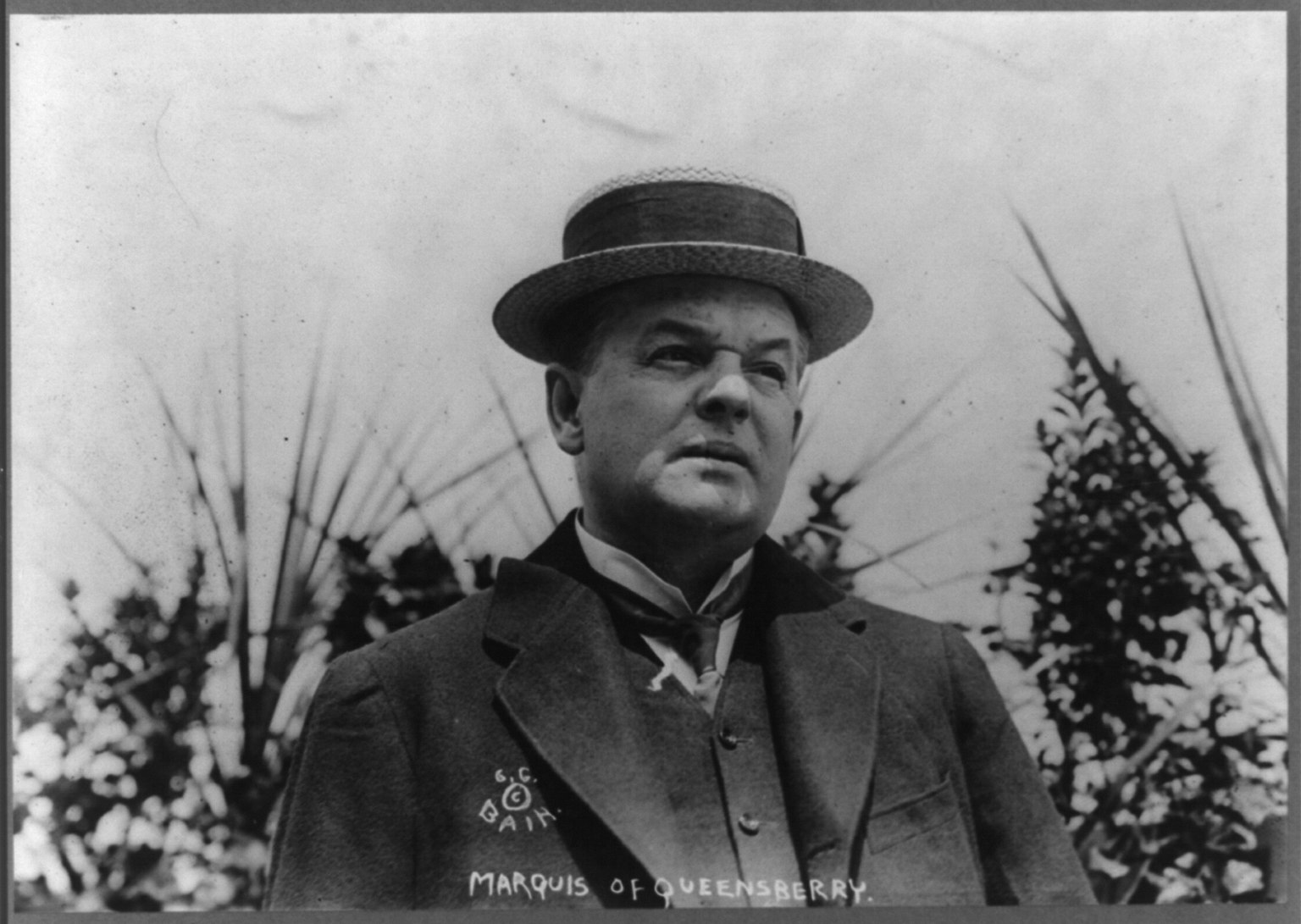
- Born: 13 October 1868; Cummertrees, Scotland
- Died: 1 August 1920 (aged 51); Johannesburg, South Africa
- Occupation: Reporter
- Spouse(s): Anna Maria Walters (m. 1893; died 1917) Mary Louise Bickel (m. 1918)
- Children: 3; Dorothy Madeline Douglas; Francis Archibald Kelhead Douglas; Cecil Charles Douglas
- Parents: John Sholto Douglas (father); Sibyl Montgomery (mother)
- Relatives: Lord Alfred Douglas (brother); Francis Archibald Douglas (brother)
- Military career
- Allegiance: United Kingdom
- Branch: British Army
- Service years: 1889–1891
- Rank: 2nd lieutenant
- Unit: King's Own Scottish Borderers

Percy Sholto Douglas, 10th Marquess of Queensberry (13 October 1868 – 1 August 1920) was a Scottish aristocrat.

Born in Cummertrees, Dumfries, Scotland, he was the second son of the 9th Marquess of Queensberry and brother of Lord Alfred Douglas, the lover of Oscar Wilde. From the death of his elder brother Francis in 1894 until his father's death in 1900, he was styled Viscount Drumlanrig.

== Career ==
In his youth Douglas served in the Royal Navy as a midshipman, then in the British Army as 2nd lieutenant in the 3rd (Militia) Battalion of the King's Own Scottish Borderers from 1889 to 1891.

He went to Kalgoorlie, Australia, as a gold prospector during the gold rush beginning in 1893, and later managed a road house in Canada. He returned to London, where he engaged in some failed financial undertakings. In 1911 he went to the United States where he worked as a reporter on New York City and Chicago newspapers.

== Dealings with his father and Oscar Wilde ==
Douglas, not his father's heir until his elder brother's death, had a troubled relationship with his father, who once called him "that so-called skunk of a son of mine". The atheist ninth Marquess disowned him for marrying a clergyman's daughter in 1893 before going to Australia, but effected a reconciliation when he returned. During the Oscar Wilde trials in 1895, his father assaulted him on a London street, leading to both men being bound over to keep the peace for £500 (equivalent to £56,842 in 2025). In 1900 his dying father spat on him when he came to visit.

Three weeks following their father's funeral, the new Marquess and Lord Alfred visited Wilde in Paris, where the Anglo-Irish Wilde recalled that they were "in deep mourning and the highest spirits. The English are like this." He dissipated what remained of the family fortune in less than eighteen months and was sued for bankruptcy in December 1901.

== Family ==
The Marquess was married twice:

- Firstly, on 11 September 1893, to Anna Maria (known as "Minnie"), daughter of the Reverend Thomas Walters, Vicar of Royston near Launceston, Cornwall. She was born in 1866 and died on 25 April 1917, leaving issue a daughter and two sons:

- Dorothy Madeline Douglas, born 5 July 1894. Married, 1924, Esmond Brasnell Palmer on 4 Oct 1924 The Garrison Church, Saint Andrew, Jamaica.
- Francis Archibald Kelhead Douglas, 11th Marquess of Queensberry, born 17 January 1896, died 27 April 1954
- Cecil Charles Douglas, born 27 December 1898, died 26 February 1981

- Secondly, on 4 December 1918, Mary Louise, daughter of Richard Bickel of Cardiff, Wales, and widow of Ernest Morgan. The couple had no children and she died 4 April 1956.

The Marquess died on 1 August 1920 in Johannesburg, South Africa, aged 51, and was succeeded as 11th Marquess by his elder son. He was buried in England at Kensal Green Cemetery, London.

Peerage of Scotland
Preceded by John Sholto Douglas	Marquess of Queensberry; 1900 – 1920	Succeeded by Francis Douglas
