= Gilbert Burrell Spencer Follett =

British Army officer (1878–1918)

Brigadier General Gilbert Burrell Spencer Follett DSO MVO
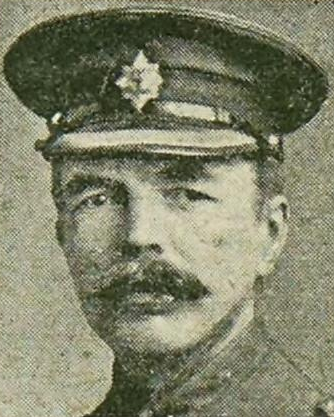
- Born: July 1878
- Died: 27 September 1918 (aged 40)

Brigadier General Gilbert Burrell Spencer Follett, DSO, MVO (July 1878 – 27 September 1918) was a British Army officer. Promoted in September 1915 to major, and in March 1918 to temporary brigadier general, he was killed in action in Dernancourt, France, while in command of the 3rd Guards Brigade.

He is buried in Beaumetz Crossroads Cemetery.

== Family ==
Follett was married to Lady Mildred Murray, youngest daughter of Charles Murray, 7th Earl of Dunmore. They had two children. His son married Cathleen Mann. His grandson through his daughter is Michael Brougham, 5th Baron Brougham and Vaux.

== Bibliography ==
- Davis, Frank; Maddocks, Graham (1995). Bloody Red Tabs - General Officer Casualties of the Great War, 1914-1918. London: Leo Cooper, p. 61.
