= Cory Cory-Wright =

British businessman (1838–1909)

- Baronet of Caen Wood Towers and Hornsey
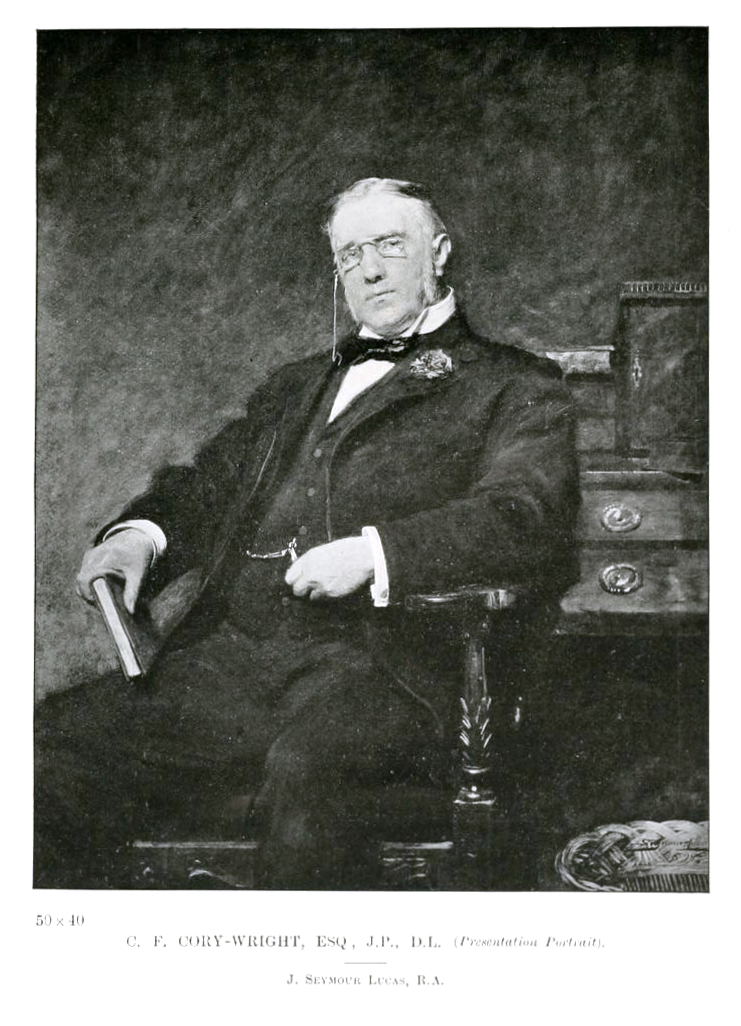
- Tenure: 1903–1909
- Predecessor: New creation
- Successor: Arthur Cory-Wright, 2nd Baronet
- Born: Cory Wright; 11 August 1848
- Died: 30 May 1909 (aged 60)
- Buried: Highgate Cemetery
- Spouse: Mima Owen (m. 1867)
- Issue: Arthur Cory-Wright
- Father: William Wright
- Mother: Elizabeth Hooper

Sir Cory Francis Cory-Wright, 1st Baronet (11 August 1838 – 30 May 1909) was a British businessman.

== Biography ==
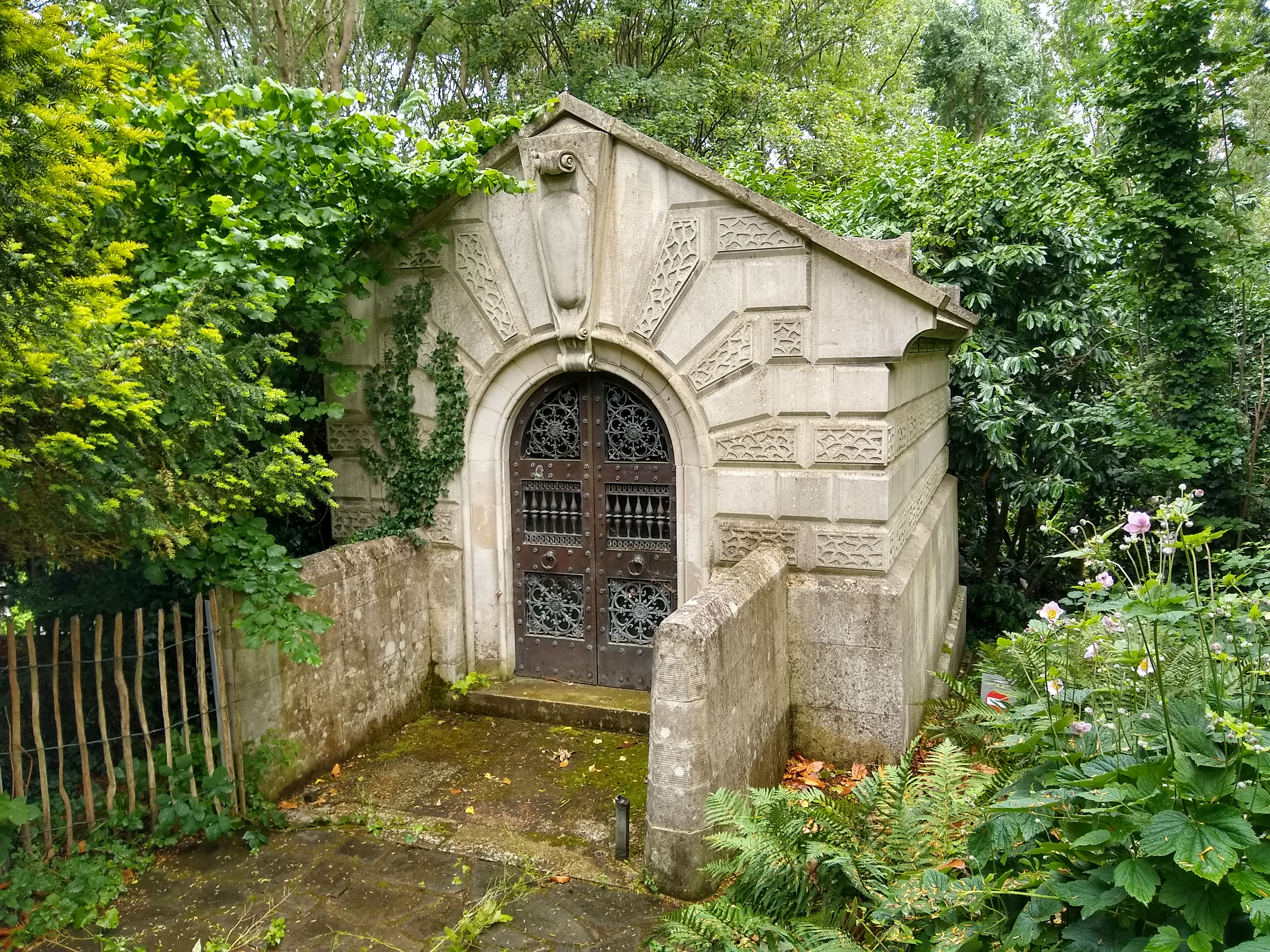
The Cory-Wright Mausoleum at Highgate Cemetery (West)

The son of William Wright and Elizabeth Hooper, he married Mima Owen, the daughter of Sir Hugh Owen and Ann Wade, on 25 September 1867. Sir Cory Francis Cory-Wright, 1st Baronet Cory-Wright held the office of Deputy Lieutenant (DL) of Middlesex and was a Justice of the Peace (JP) for Middlesex and London.

He was the Chairman of William Cory & Son and was a County Alderman (CA) for Middlesex and High Sheriff of Middlesex in 1902. He was created a Baronet Cory-Wright, of Caen Wood Towers, Highgate St. Pancras, co. London and Hornsey, co. Middlesex on 28 August 1903. Born Cory Wright, he assumed by Royal licence the additional surname of Cory in 1903.

He died on 30 May 1909, aged 70, and was succeeded to the title by his son Arthur Cory-Wright. He is buried on the western side of Highgate Cemetery in a family mausoleum located to the south of the Egyptian Avenue.

Baronetage of the United Kingdom
New title	Baronet (of Caen Wood Towers and Hornsey); 1903–1909	Succeeded by Arthur Cory-Wright
