= Harrington Mann =

Scottish painter (1864–1937)

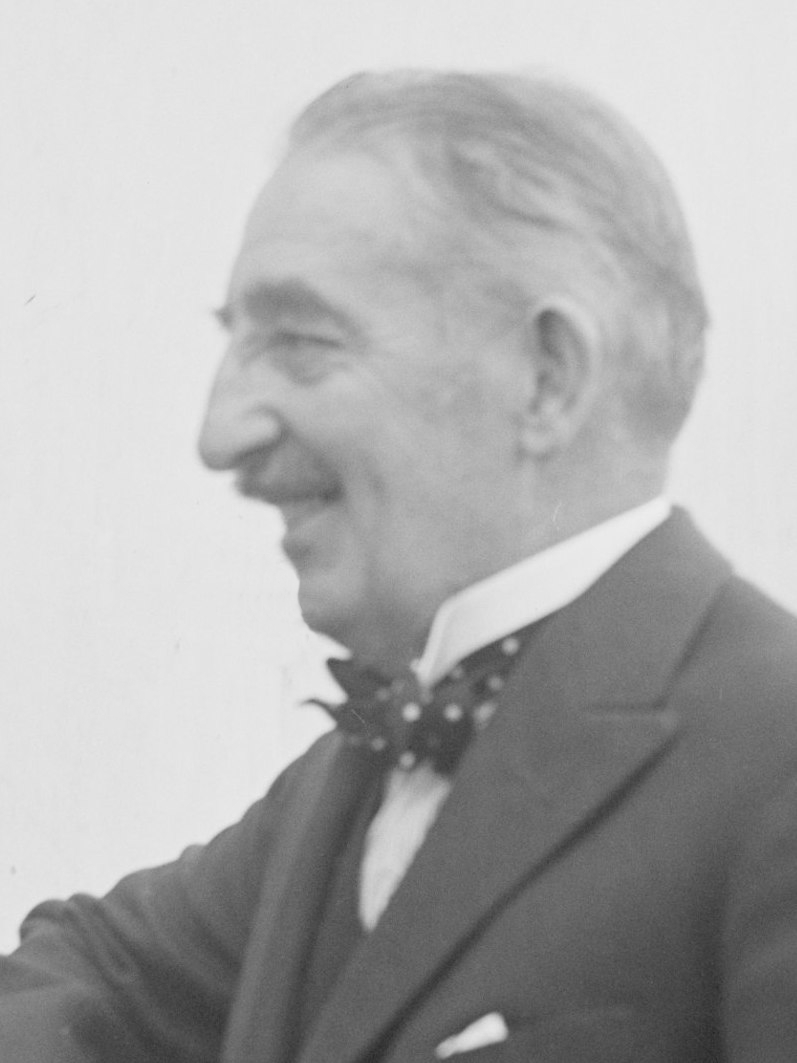
- Born: 7 October 1864; Glasgow
- Died: 28 February 1937 (aged 72); New York
- Known for: Portraiture
- Notable work: A Fairy-Tale (1902)
- Movement: Glasgow Boys

Harrington Mann (7 October 1864 – 28 February 1937) was a Scottish portrait artist and decorative painter. He was a member of the Glasgow Boys movement in the 1880s.

== Art career ==
Mann was born in Glasgow and began his studies at the Glasgow School of Art. He then studied at the Slade School of Fine Art in London under professor Alphonse Legros. He then studied in Paris under the guidance of the figure painters Gustave Boulanger and Jules-Joseph Lefebvre at the Academie Julian for a short time.

Mann's early paintings from the 1880s are mainly of fishing communities in Yorkshire. He began to develop a name for himself in portrait painting in the 1890s.

He had a strong sense of colour and design for decorating interior walls and for stained glass. In the 1890s he designed for the Scottish firm of J. and W. Guthrie (which became Guthrie and Wells). In 1893 he designed the stained glass for the west window of St Bartholomew's Church, Barbon, in what is now Cumbria.

In 1900, he moved south to London, also opening a studio in New York, where his paintings became popular. In London, he found success in society portraits, especially of children and including members of the British royal family.

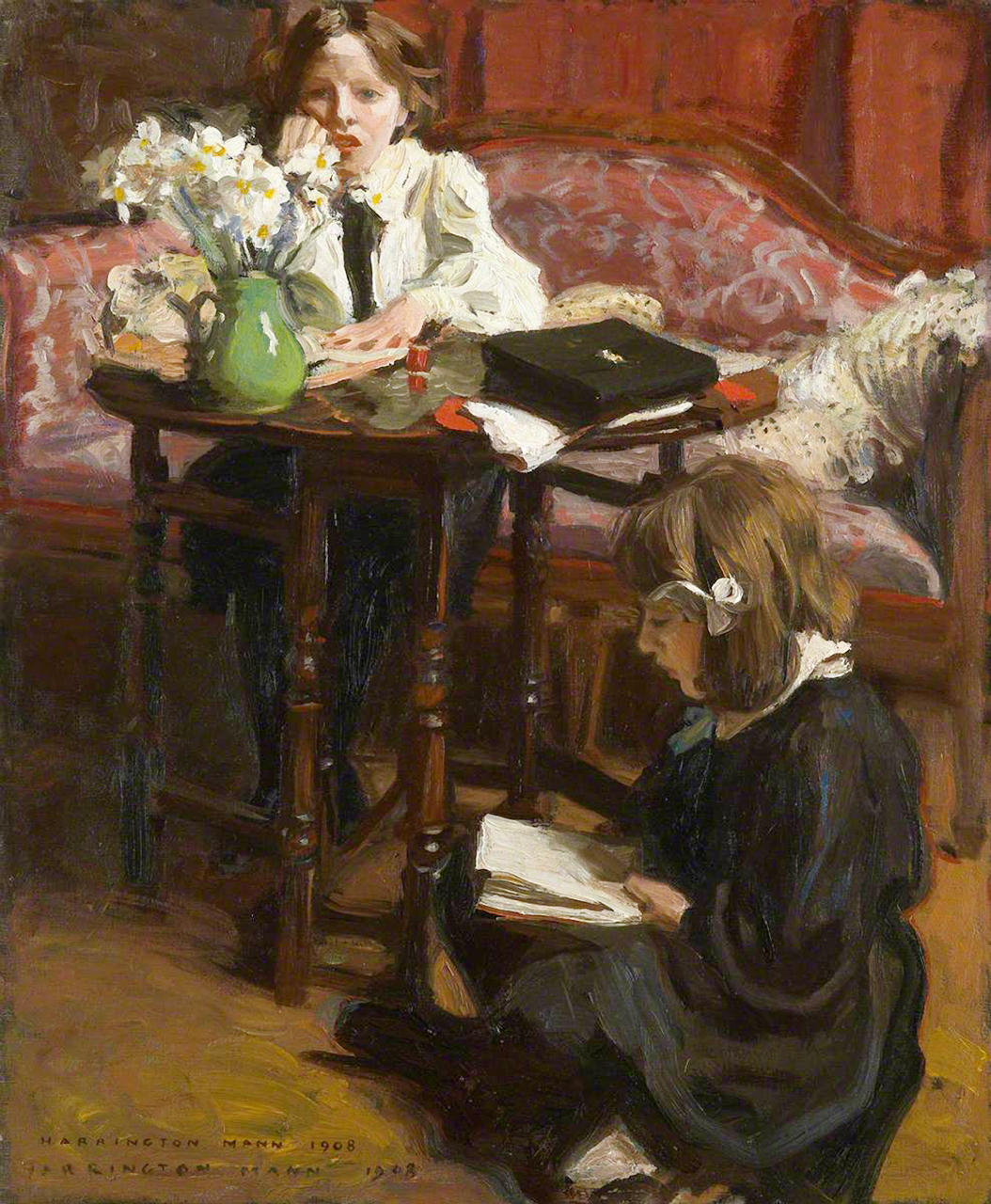
Lesson Time (1908)

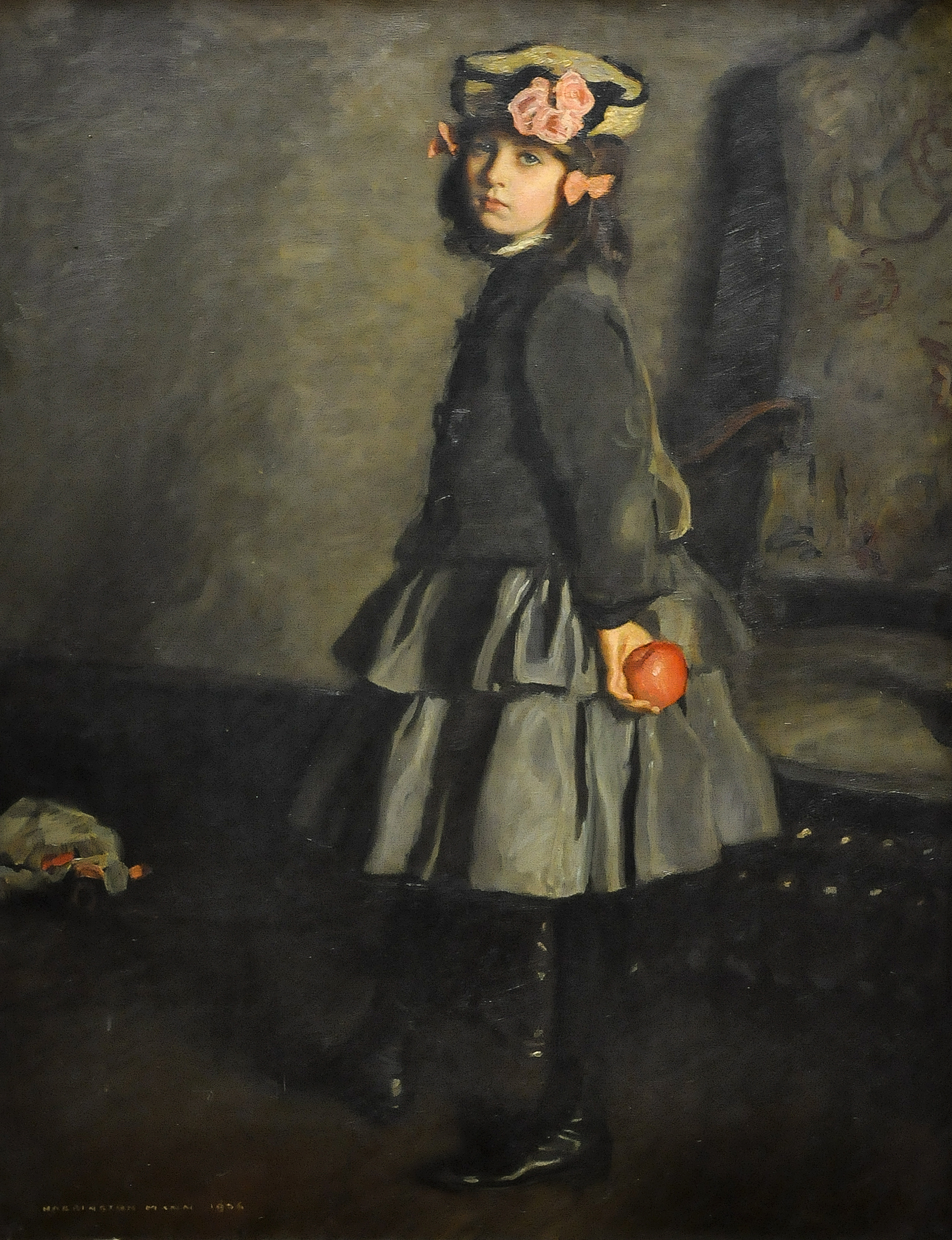
Cathleen (1906), painted by her father at the Museum of Fine Arts, Ghent

Mann's use of colour was influenced by James McNeill Whistler. His bold brushwork shows the influence of John Singer Sargent.

Mann was one of the founder members of the National Portrait Society in 1911.

== Family ==
He was the second son of John Mann (1827–1910), a chartered accountant, and Mary Newton Harrington (1834–1917), a novelist. John's father was also a painter, John Mann (1797-1827).

Mann married the interior decorator Florence Sabine-Pasley (known as Dolly Mann).

Mann had three daughters, who appeared in several of his paintings, including Cathleen Sabine, an artist, who married Francis Douglas, 11th Marquess of Queensberry and then J.R. Follett.

== Works ==
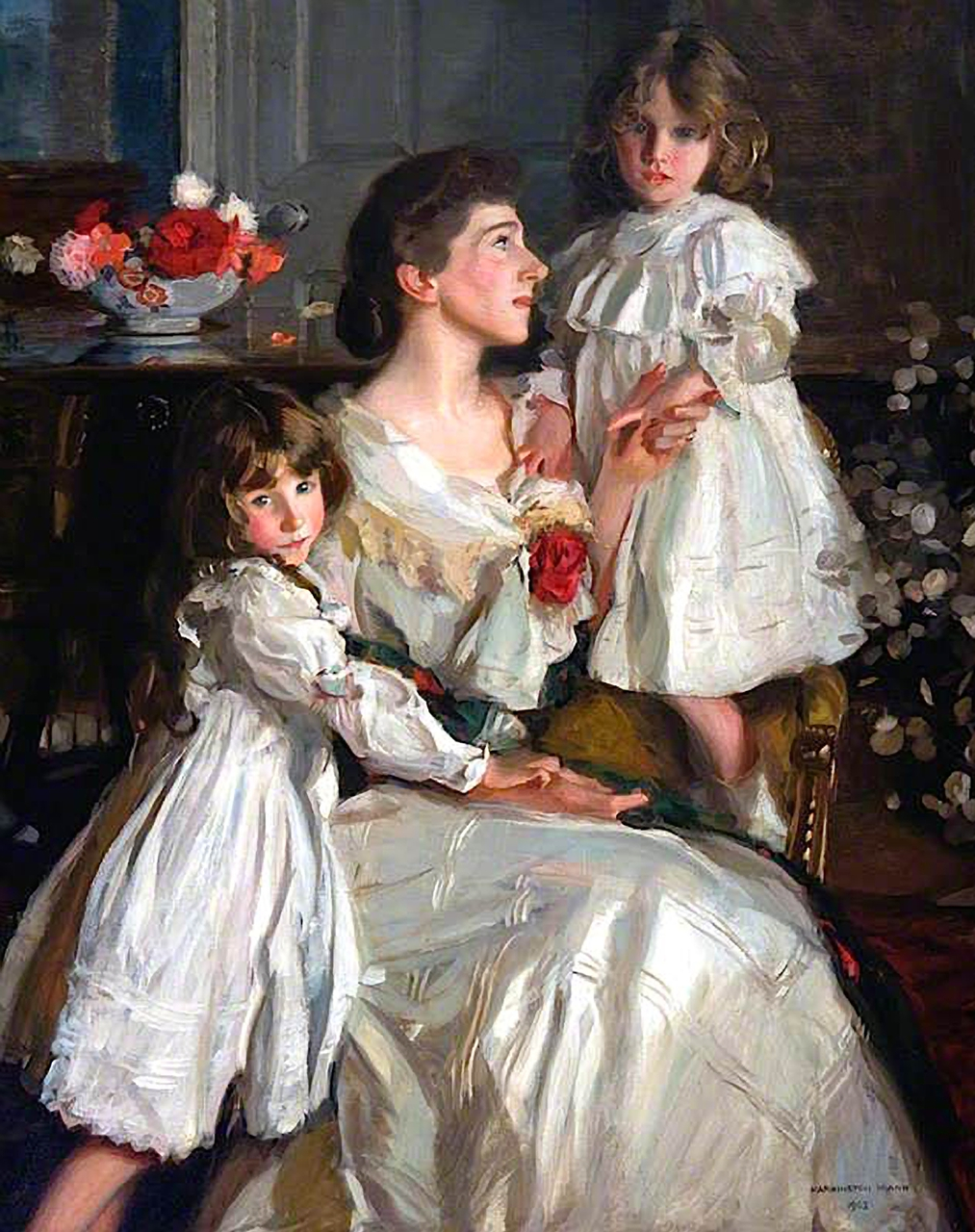
Portrait of Alice Marjorie Cunningham (d.1943) with her daughters Marjorie and Millicent (1902)

Mann painted a large number of society portraits, including the following.

Portraits

- The Fairy Tale, 1902
- Miss Tibbie Nairn, 1900
- The Red Hat, 1920

Decorative paintings

- The Study for Mardi Gras, 1910

Landscapes

- Boy and Black Pigs, 1886
- Tangiers, 1889
- Café en Provence, 1930

Interiors

In 1888, Mann painted the interior of the hall of the Ewing Gilmour Institute for Girls, Smollet Street (and Gilmour Street), Alexandria, near Glasgow, designed by John Archibald Campbell. (The building has been known as a Masonic Hall since 1915.)

== Exhibitions ==
Mann's works are today exhibited in the Tate Gallery and in the Glasgow Museums.

- Royal Academy from 1885 onwards
- International Society from 1898 onwards
- Leicester Galleries, 1908 (solo)

== Reception ==
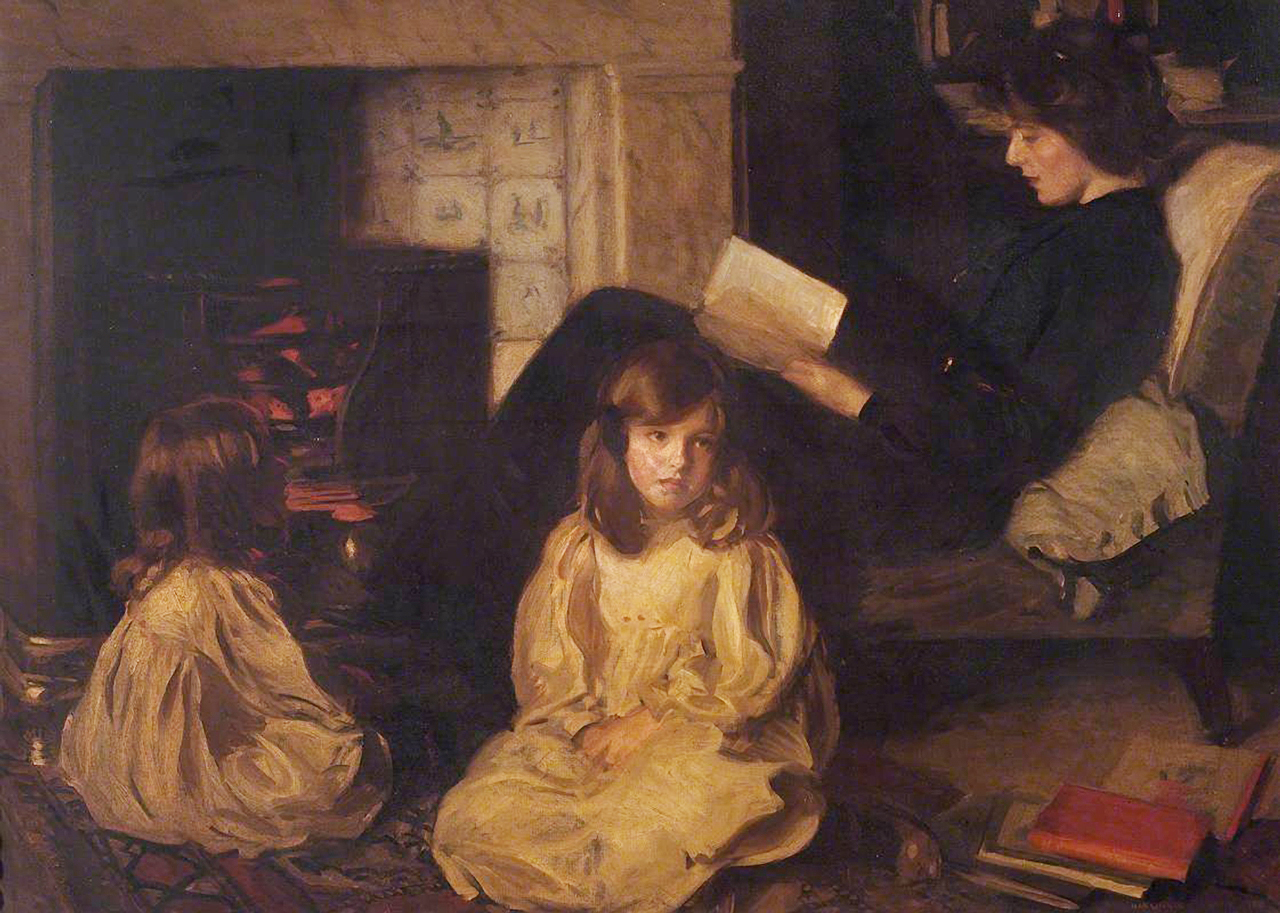
A Fairy-Tale (1902)

The Century Magazine of 1908 praised Mann and his painting A Fairy-Tale. Mann, the magazine reported, had "always showed singular versatility, having devoted himself by turns to decorative cartoons for stained glass, to mural painting, landscape, genre, and portraiture." The magazine went on "While his likenesses usually maintain a high level of attainment, it is in certain less formal portrait groups that Mr. Mann reveals perhaps the most sympathetic and attractive phase of his talent." Of A Fairy-Tale, the magazine opined that he displayed "refreshing charm and [a] touch of juvenile romance".

== Death ==
Mann died in New York City on 28 February 1937.

== Bibliography ==
- Chamot, Mary; Farr, Dennis; Butlin, Martin. The Modern British Paintings, Drawings and Sculpture, London 1964, II.
- Wood, Christopher, The Dictionary of Victorian Artists 2nd edition, Woodbridge, 1978.
