= Cory-Wright baronets =

Baronetcy in the Baronetage of the United Kingdom

The Cory-Wright Baronetcy, of Caen Wood Towers, High Gate, in St. Pancras in the County of London and Hornsey in the County of Middlesex, is a title in the Baronetage of the United Kingdom. It was created on 28 August 1903 for Cory Cory-Wright, Chairman of William Cory & Son, coal and oil shippers. Born Cory Wright, he assumed by Royal licence the additional surname of Cory in 1903. He was High Sheriff of Middlesex in 1902.

The second Baronet was High Sheriff of Hertfordshire in 1921. The third Baronet was the husband of Felicity Tree, daughter of Sir Herbert Beerbohm Tree.

The present Baronet is the son of Captain Anthony John Julian Cory-Wright (1916–1944) and Susan Esterel Elwes. Captain Cory-Wright was the eldest son of Sir Geoffrey Cory-Wright, the 3rd Baronet Cory-Wright. Captain Cory-Wright was killed in action on 26 June 1944, aged 27, at Saint-Manvieu, Normandy in France, when the present Baronet was only six months old. His mother remarried, in 1949, to Lt.-Col. Jocelyn Eustace Gurney.

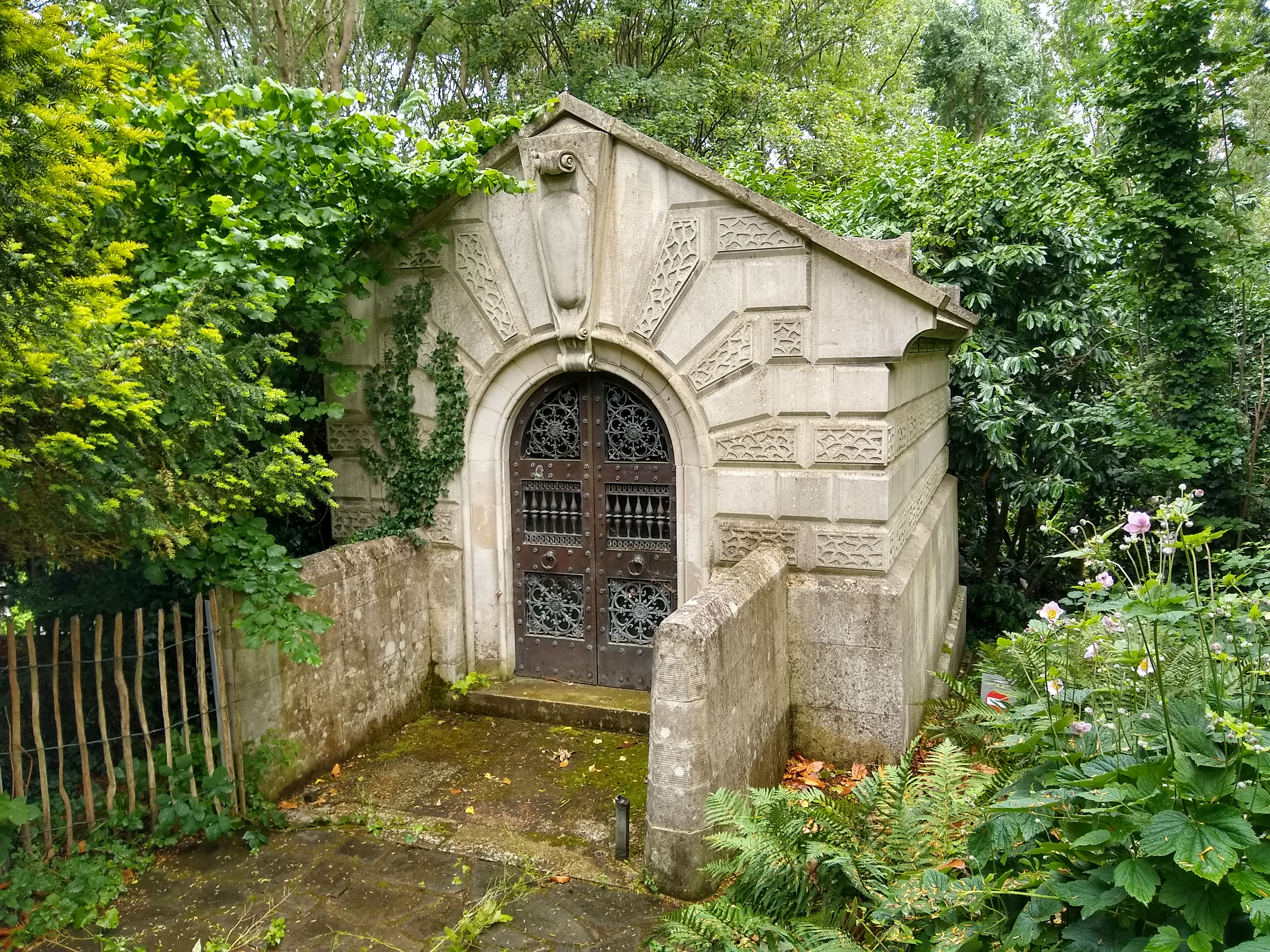
The Cory-Wright Mausoleum at Highgate Cemetery (West)

== Cory-Wright baronets, of Caen Wood Towers and Hornsey (1903) ==
- Sir Cory Francis Cory-Wright, 1st Baronet (1838–1909)
- Sir Arthur Cory Cory-Wright, 2nd Baronet (1869–1951)
- Sir Geoffrey Cory-Wright, 3rd Baronet (1892–1969)
- Sir Richard Michael Cory-Wright, 4th Baronet (born 1944)

The heir apparent is the present holder's son Roland Anthony Cory-Wright (born 1979).

== Notes ==
.

Baronetage of the United Kingdom
Preceded by Brocklehurst baronets	Cory-Wright baronets of Caen Wood Towers and Hornsey; 28 August 1903	Succeeded by Hickman baronets
