= Lumbres =

Lumbres Lumeres
- Commune
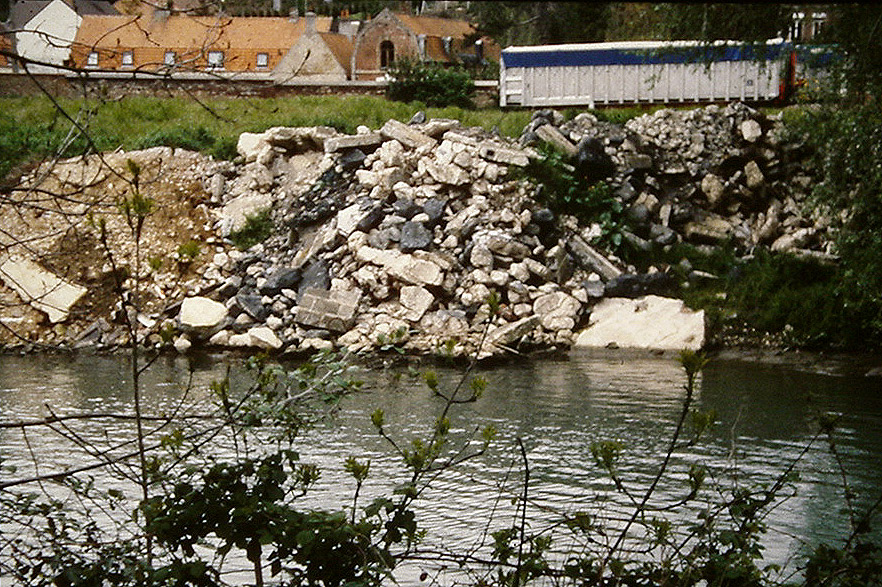
- Aa river, its banks shored up with heavy rubble

- Coat of arms
- Location of Lumbres
- Location within France Location within Hauts-de-France
- Coordinates: 50°42′21″N 2°07′18″E
- Country: France
- Region: Hauts-de-France
- Department: Pas-de-Calais
- Arrondissement: Saint-Omer
- Canton: Lumbres
- Intercommunality: Pays de Lumbres

Government
  - Mayor (2020–2026): Joëlle Delrue
- Area^{1}: 9.9 km^{2} (3.8 sq mi)
- Elevation: 47 m (154 ft)
- Highest elevation: 133 m (436 ft)
- Lowest elevation: 35 m (115 ft)
- Population (2023): 3,579
  - Density: 360/km^{2} (940/sq mi)
- Time zone: UTC+01:00 (CET)
  - Summer (DST): UTC+02:00 (CEST)
- INSEE/Postal code: 62534 /62380
- ^{1} French Land Register data, which excludes lakes, ponds, glaciers > 1 km^{2} (0.386 sq mi or 247 acres) and river estuaries.

Lumbres (French pronunciation: [lœ̃bʁ]; West Flemish: Lumeres) is a commune in the Pas-de-Calais department in the Hauts-de-France region of France at the junction of the valleys of the rivers Aa and Bléquin, about 6 miles (10 km) southwest of Saint-Omer.

== Population ==
Historical population
Year	Pop.	±% p.a.
1968	3,599	—
1975	3,803	+0.79%
1982	4,107	+1.10%
1990	3,944	−0.50%
1999	3,873	−0.20%
2007	3,744	−0.42%
2012	3,802	+0.31%
2017	3,626	−0.94%
2023	3,579	−0.22%
Source: INSEE

== History ==
Evidence of prehistoric occupation, at the place known as the Montagne de Lumbres has been discovered by. Pontier and Canon Collet, of the abbey of Wisques, who were the first to study the prehistory of the area, including Arques, Elnes and Wavrans.
Because of its industrial importance, and proximity to fortified V2 sites, the commune suffered heavily from Allied bombing during World War II.

== Transport ==
The Chemin de fer d'Anvin à Calais (CF AC) opened a railway station at Lumbres in 1881. The CF AC was closed in 1955. Lumbres station is also on the Boulogne – Saint-Omer line.

== See also ==
- Communes of the Pas-de-Calais department
