= East Yorkshire Regiment =

Former regiment of the British Army

East Yorkshire Regiment (The Duke of York's Own)
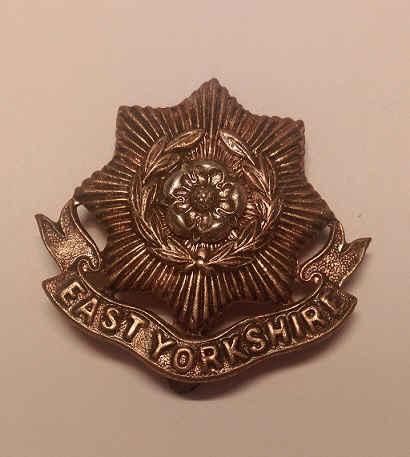
- Cap badge
- Active: 1685–1958
- Country: Kingdom of England (1685–1707); Kingdom of Great Britain (1707–1800); United Kingdom (1801–1958)
- Branch: British Army
- Type: Line infantry
- Role: Infantry
- Size: 1–2 Regular battalions 1 Militia Battalion; 2 Territorial battalions Up to 16 Hostilities-only battalions
- RHQ: Victoria Barracks, Beverley
- Nicknames: The Snappers; The Poona Guards
- Anniversaries: Quebec (13 September)

The East Yorkshire Regiment was a line infantry regiment of the British Army, first raised in 1685 as Sir William Clifton's Regiment of Foot and later renamed the 15th Regiment of Foot. It saw service for three centuries, before eventually being amalgamated with the West Yorkshire Regiment (Prince of Wales's Own) in 1958, to form the Prince of Wales's Own Regiment of Yorkshire. Subsequently, the regiment amalgamated with the Green Howards and the Duke of Wellington's Regiment (West Riding) to form the Yorkshire Regiment (14th/15th, 19th and 33rd/76th Foot) on 6 June 2006.

== History ==
=== Early wars ===
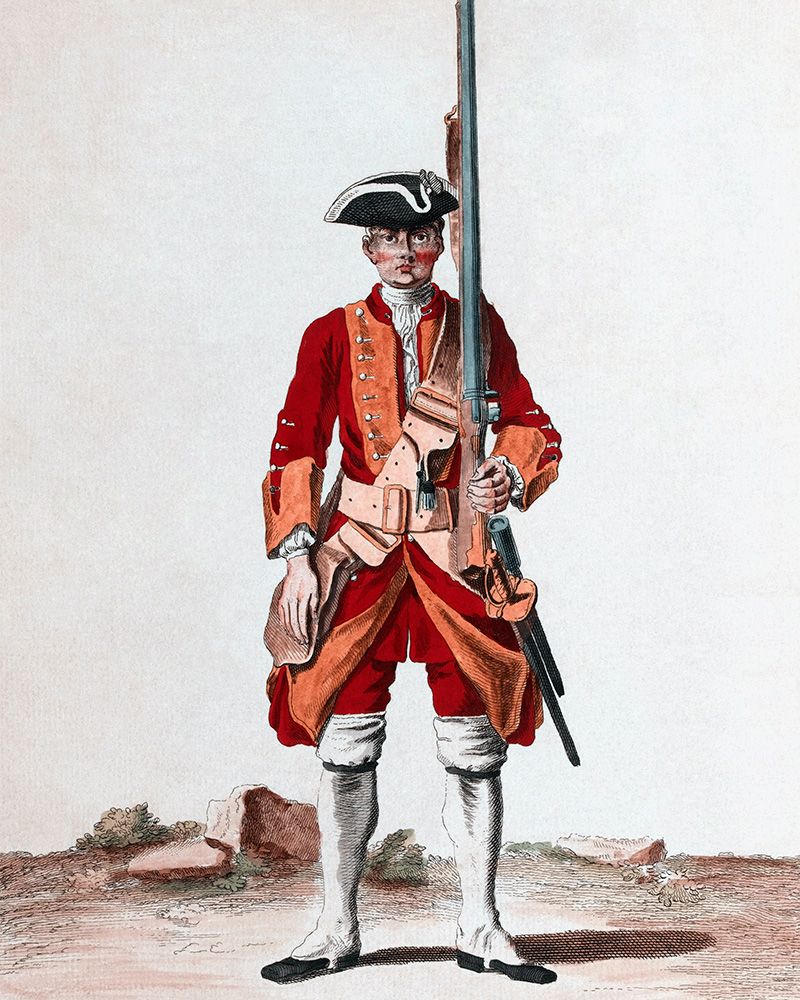
c. 1742 engraving of a regimental private

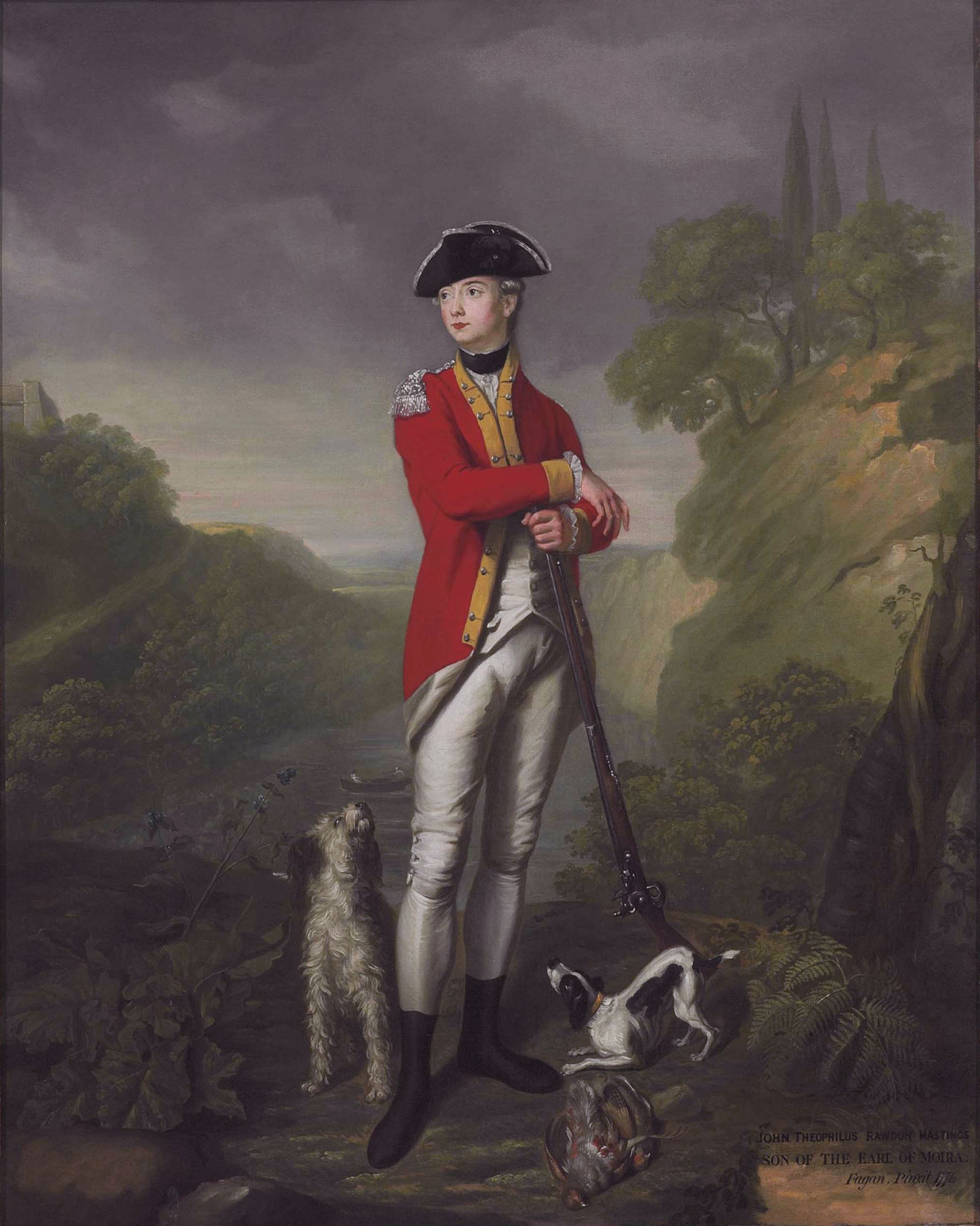
1776 portrait of a regimental officer

Raised in 1685 in Nottingham by Sir William Clifton, 3rd Baronet, the regiment was originally, like many British infantry regiments, known by the name of its current Colonel. It took part in the Battle of Killiecrankie in July 1689 and the Battle of Cromdale in April 1690 during the Jacobite rising of 1689 to 1692.

The regiment embarked for Flanders in spring 1694 for service in the Nine Years' War and took part in the capture of Huy in autumn 1694, the attack of Fort Knokke in June 1695 and the Siege of Namur in summer 1695 before returning home in 1697.

The regiment was sent to Holland in 1701 for service in the War of the Spanish Succession and fought at the siege of Kaiserswerth in 1702, the siege of Venlo later that year and the Battle of Blenheim in August 1704. It went on to fight at the Battle of Ramillies in May 1706, the Battle of Oudenarde in July 1708 and the Battle of Malplaquet in September 1709. It returned to England in 1714. It was sent to Scotland and took part in the Battle of Glen Shiel in June 1719 during Jacobite rising.

The regiment was deployed to South America, where it took part in the Battle of Cartagena de Indias in March 1741 during the War of Jenkins' Ear. It also saw action at the Battle of Culloden in April 1746 during the next Jacobite rising. In 1751, when the numerical system of designation of Regiments of Foot was adopted, it became the 15th Regiment of Foot.

The regiment went on to take part in the capture of Île-d'Aix in 1757 and, having sailed for North America in 1758, fought at the Battle of the Plains of Abraham in 1759 during the Seven Years' War. After the conclusion of the aforementioned war, the regiment was deployed to Montreal, Canada in c. October 1765.

The regiment was sent to North America again in spring 1776 for service in the American Revolutionary War. It saw action at the Battle of Long Island in August 1776, the Battle of White Plains in October 1776 and the Battle of Fort Washington in November 1776. It also took part in the Battle of Brandywine in September 1777, the Battle of Germantown in October and the Battle of White Marsh in December 1777.

In 1782 the regiment became the 15th (The Yorkshire East Riding) Regiment of Foot.

=== Napoleonic Wars ===
The regiment was deployed to the West Indies in 1795 for service in the French Revolutionary Wars and fought at attacks on Martinique and Guadeloupe before returning to England in 1796. The regiment returned to the West Indies in 1805 for service in the Napoleonic Wars and took part in the invasion of Martinique in January 1809 and the invasion of Guadeloupe in January 1810.

=== The Victorian era ===
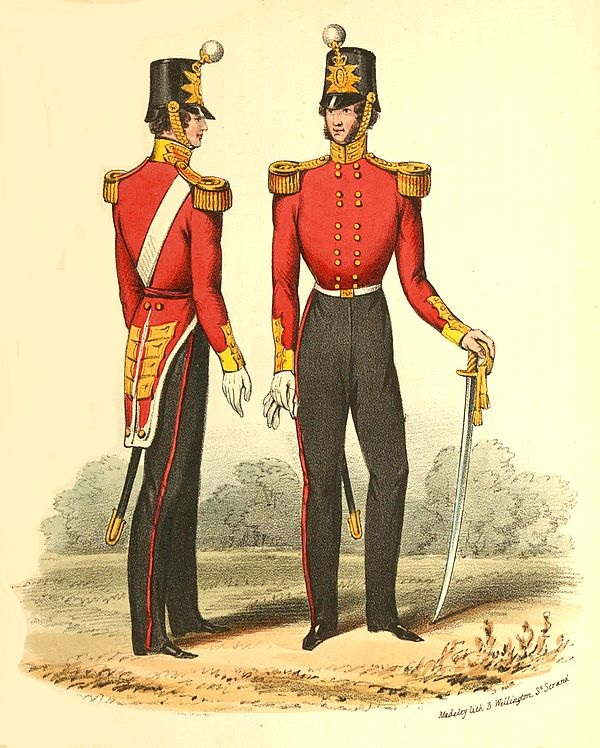
1848 illustration of two regimental officers

The regiment spent most of the 19th century on garrison duty, both at home and throughout the Empire. The 1st Battalion was shipped to New Brunswick in 1862 at the time of the Trent Affair, when Britain and the United States came close to war. The regiment was not fundamentally affected by the Cardwell Reforms of the 1870s, which gave it a depot at Victoria Barracks, Beverley from 1873, or by the Childers reforms of 1881 – as it already possessed two battalions, there was no need for it to amalgamate with another regiment. Under the reforms the regiment became The East Yorkshire Regiment on 1 July 1881. The 1st battalion was stationed at Gibraltar in 1885, moved to the West Indies in 1886, then to South Africa in 1888 and to Egypt in 1893. From 1895 the battalion was stationed in British India, where they had various postings, including at Belgaum and Fort St. George in Madras Presidency until late 1902 when it was posted to Shwebo in Burma.

The 2nd Battalion was stationed in British India from 1875 to February 1888, and fought in the Second Anglo-Afghan War (1879–80). After six months in Aden that year, the battalion was back in England until November 1894, when it was stationed in Ireland. The Second Boer War started in South Africa in October 1899. After a series of defeats in the early months of the war, the British government sent large number of troops there as reinforcements in early 1900, including the 2nd Battalion East Yorkshire. 870 officers and men embarked on the SS Nile from Southampton in March 1900, and arrived in South Africa the following month. The battalion stayed in South Africa throughout the war, returning home in late 1902 when they were stationed at Aldershot.

The 3rd (Militia) battalion, formed from the East York Militia in 1881, was a reserve battalion. It was embodied in May 1900, disembodied in December that year, and later re-embodied for service in South Africa during the Second Boer War. About 560 officers and men returned to Southampton on the SS Greek in early October 1902, following the end of the war, when the battalion was disembodied at Beverley.

In 1908, the Volunteers and Militia were reorganised nationally, with the former becoming the Territorial Force and the latter the Special Reserve; the regiment now had one Reserve and two Territorial battalions.

=== First World War ===
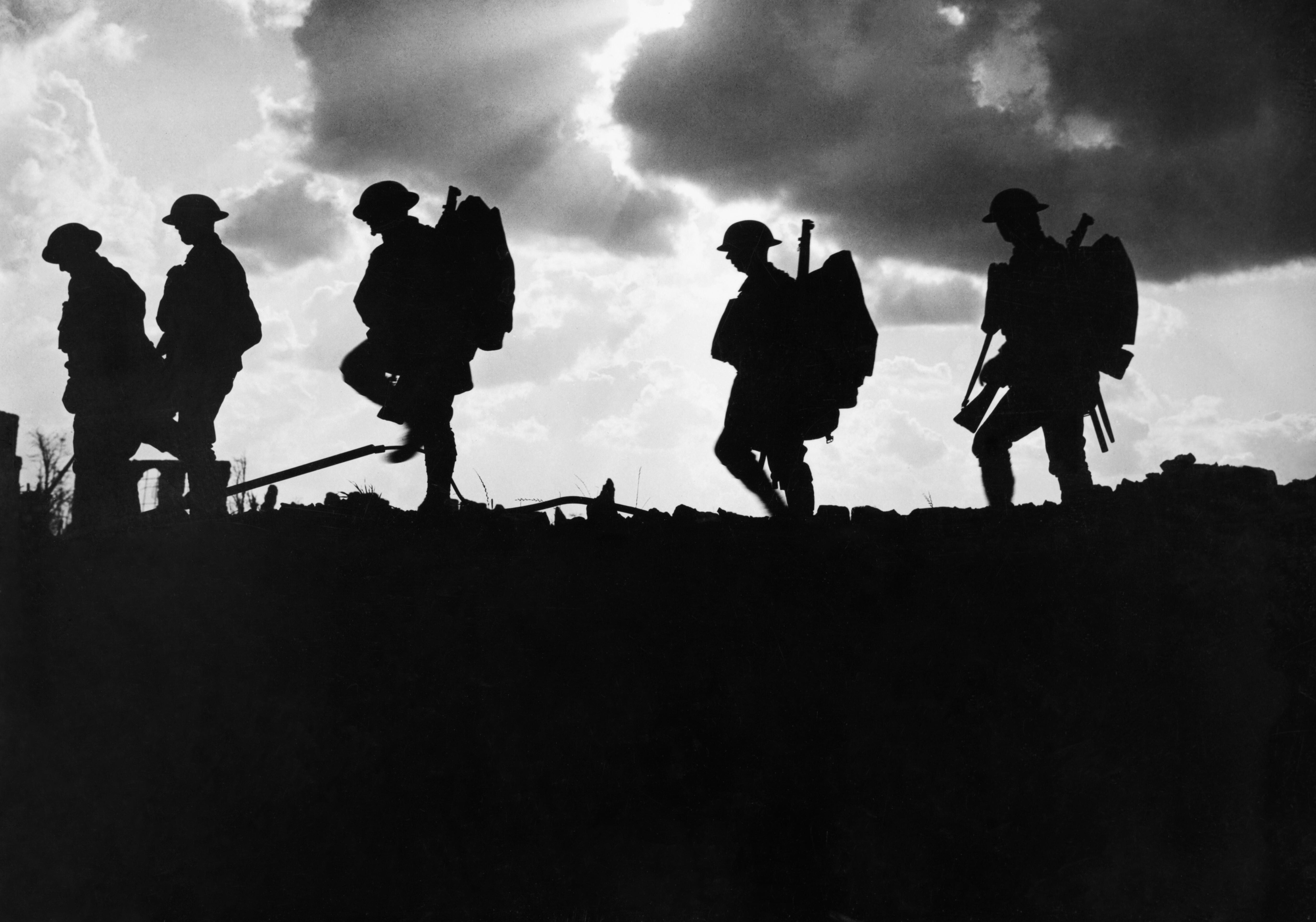
Men of the 8th (Service) Battalion, East Yorkshire Regiment, going up to the line near Frezenberg during the Battle of Broodseinde, 1917. Photo by Ernest Brooks

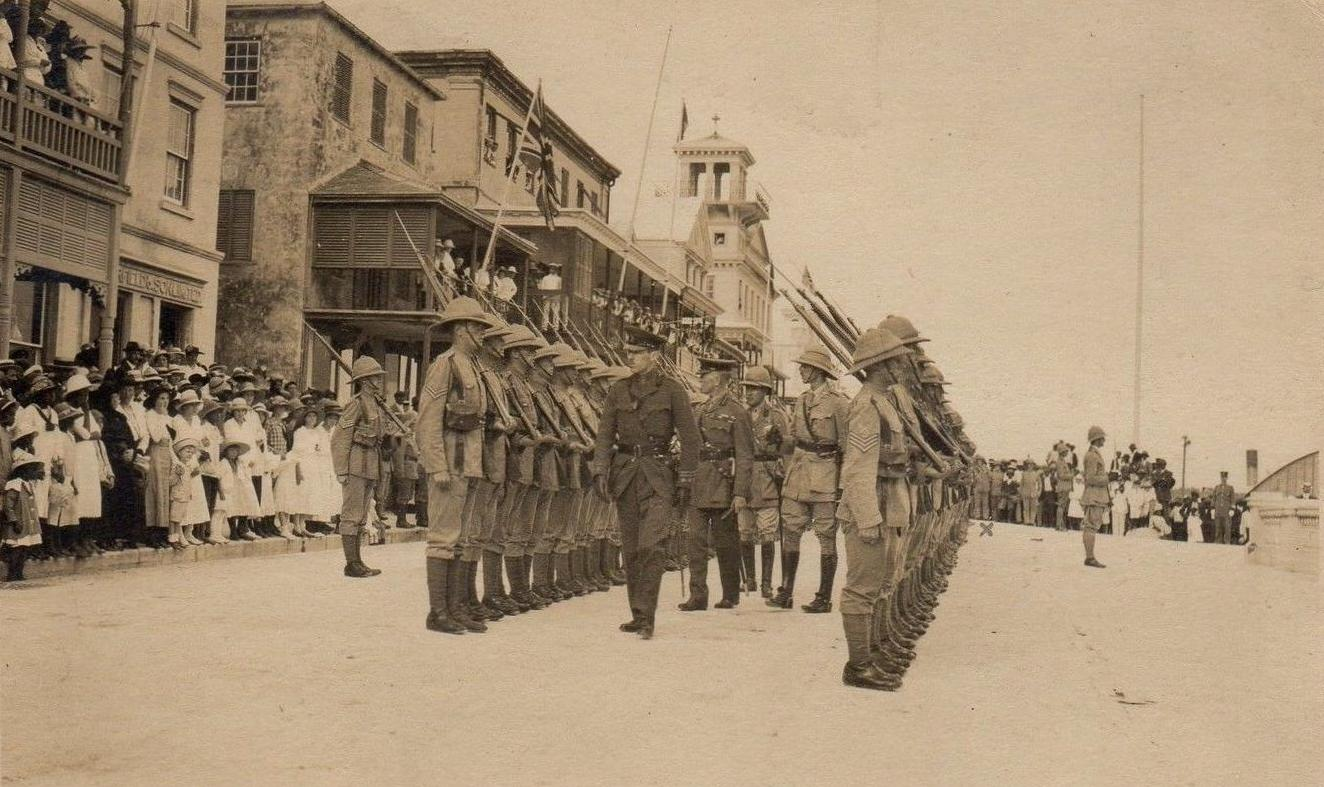
Men of the 2/4th Battalion, East Yorkshire Regiment, and General Sir James Willcocks in Hamilton, Bermuda in 1917.

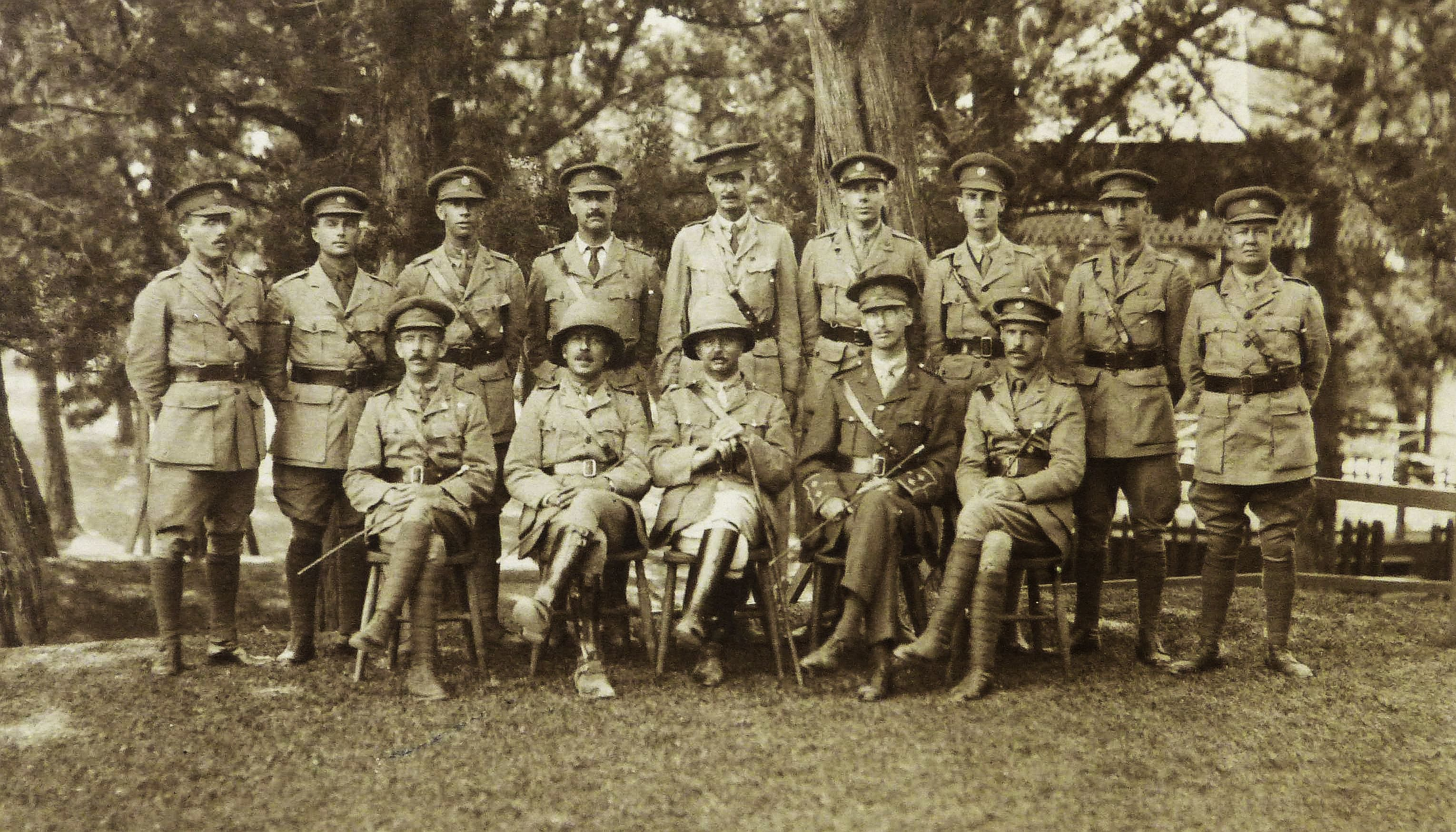
Bermuda Volunteer Rifle Corps officers attached to the 2/4th Battalion, East Yorkshire Regiment, in Bermuda, 1918.

==== Regular Army ====
The 1st Battalion landed at Saint-Nazaire as part of the 18th Brigade in the 6th Division in September 1914 for service on the Western Front.

The 2nd Battalion landed at Le Havre as part of the 83rd Brigade in the 28th Division in January 1915 also for service on the Western Front before moving to Salonika in October 1915 for service on the Macedonian front.

==== Territorial Force ====
The 1/4th Battalion landed at Boulogne-sur-Mer as part of the York and Durham Brigade in the Northumbrian Division in April 1915 for service on the Western Front.

The 2/4th Battalion served in the garrison of the Imperial fortress colony of Bermuda (where the Right Wing, 15th Regiment of Foot had been stationed from 1819 to 1821, and the 1st Battalion, 15th Regiment of Foot had been stationed from 1868 to 1870) from November 1916, through the end of the war, and the 3/4th Battalion remained at home and trained reinforcements. The 5th (Cyclist) Battalion served on coastal defence duties for the whole war.

==== New Armies ====
The 6th (Service) Battalion landed at Suvla Bay in Gallipoli as the pioneer battalion for the 11th (Northern) Division in August 1915; the battalion was evacuated in January 1916 and then landed at Marseille in July 1916 for service on the Western Front.

The 7th (Service) Battalion landed at Boulogne-sur-Mer as part of 50th Brigade in the 17th (Northern) Division in July 1915 also for service on the Western Front.

The 8th (Service) Battalion landed at Boulogne-sur-Mer as part of the 62nd Brigade in the 21st Division in September 1915 also for service on the Western Front, later serving with 3rd Division.

The 9th (Reserve) Battalion remained at home supplying drafts to the New Army battalions serving overseas.

The 10th, 11th, 12th and 13th (Service) battalions were raised in September 1914 from men volunteering in Kingston upon Hull. These units were additionally entitled 1st, 2nd, 3rd and 4th City of Hull battalions and were known as the Hull Pals, nicknamed the 'Hull Commercials', 'Hull Tradesmen', 'Hull Sportsmen' and 'T'others' respectively. They formed 92nd Brigade in 31st Division, landed in Egypt in December 1915 and then moved to France in March 1916 also for service on the Western Front. Their depot companies became the 14th (Reserve) and 15th (Reserve) battalions.

There were also a 1st Garrison Battalion that served in India and a 2nd (Home Service) Garrison Battalion.

=== Between the wars ===
In 1935, the regiment was renamed The East Yorkshire Regiment (The Duke of York's Own), after its Colonel-in-Chief.

=== Second World War ===
The 1st Battalion was serving in British India on the outbreak of war in 1939 and did not see active service until 1942. In 1944, the Battalion was based in Bethamangala as part of the 150th Indian Infantry Brigade, where it was reorganised and trained in jungle warfare at the Jungle Warfare Training Center, Gudalur, in the Mysore jungle and then played its part in the Burma Campaign. It moved into Burma, crossing the Chindwin River at Kalewa and the Irrawaddy River at Sameikkon in April 1945 and joined the 99th Indian Infantry Brigade, part of the 17th Indian Division at Meiktila after the siege by the Japanese had been broken.

The 2nd Battalion served with the 8th Infantry Brigade (which included the 1st Suffolks and 1st South Lancs), attached to the 3rd Infantry Division throughout the whole war. At the time, the 3rd Division was commanded by Major-General Bernard Montgomery, who would later command the Anglo-Canadian 21st Army Group. The battalion and division were sent to France in late 1939 as part of the British Expeditionary Force and remained there until May 1940 when they fought in the Battle of France and were evacuated at Dunkirk. After Dunkirk, the battalion and division spent many years on home defence anticipating a German invasion of England. After late 1942, when the threat of invasion had receded, they then started training for offensive operations and, in mid-1944, invaded Normandy, France.

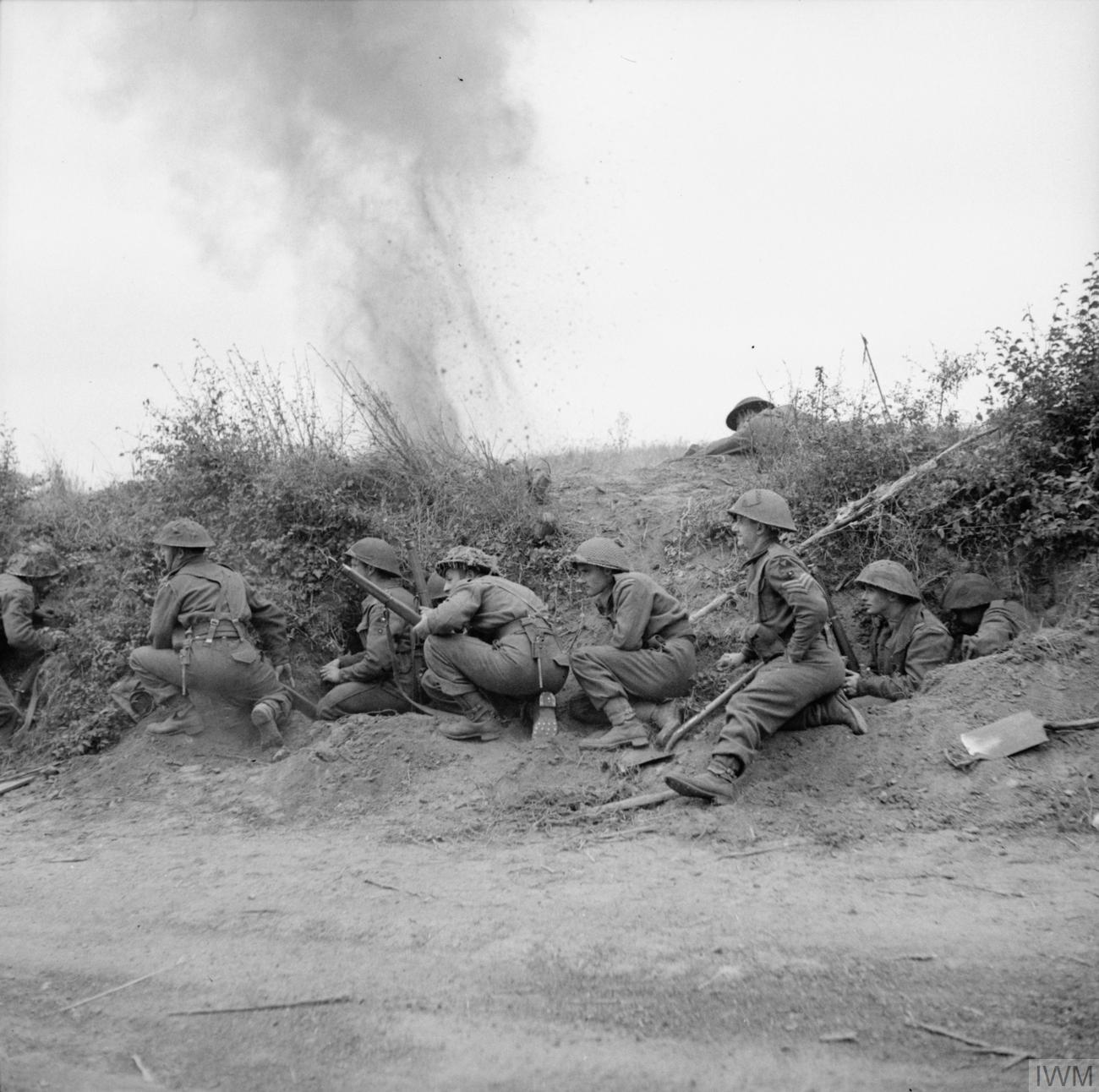
Men of the 2nd Battalion, East Yorkshire Regiment take cover behind a bank as an enemy shell explodes nearby, Normandy, France, 19 July 1944.

The 4th Battalion was a 1st Line Territorial Army unit serving in the 150th Infantry Brigade in the 50th (Northumbrian) Infantry Division and, like the 2nd Battalion, served in France 1940, were evacuated at Dunkirk to England and remained in the United Kingdom with the division until mid-1941 when it was sent to the Middle East. It was captured at the Battle of Gazala.

The 5th Battalion was formed in June 1939 as a 2nd Line Territorial Army duplicate of the 4th Battalion. It served with the 69th Infantry Brigade in the 23rd (Northumbrian) Division and was evacuated from Dunkirk. It later served with 50th (Northumbrian) Division through the Western Desert, Tunisian and Sicily campaigns before landing in the first wave on Gold Beach on D Day and then fighting through Normandy and North West Europe.

In the Second World War, three hostilities-only battalions were raised. The 6th (Home Defence) Battalion, which was formed in November 1939, was redesignated as the 30th Battalion in December 1941 and disbanded in September 1943.

The 7th Battalion was formed in 1940 and assigned to 203 Infantry Brigade. The battalion was transferred to 73 Infantry Brigade in July 1941 and to 162 Infantry Brigade in September 1942. It was disbanded in October 1944, having never left the UK.

The 50th (Holding) Battalion was formed in May 1940. In October, it was redesignated as the 8th battalion and assigned to 217 Infantry Brigade. In November 1941, the battalion was transferred to 224 Infantry Brigade, which was disbanded the following month. The battalion was then converted to 115 LAA Regiment, RA and assigned to the 46th Infantry Division, with which it served in North Africa, Italy and Palestine.

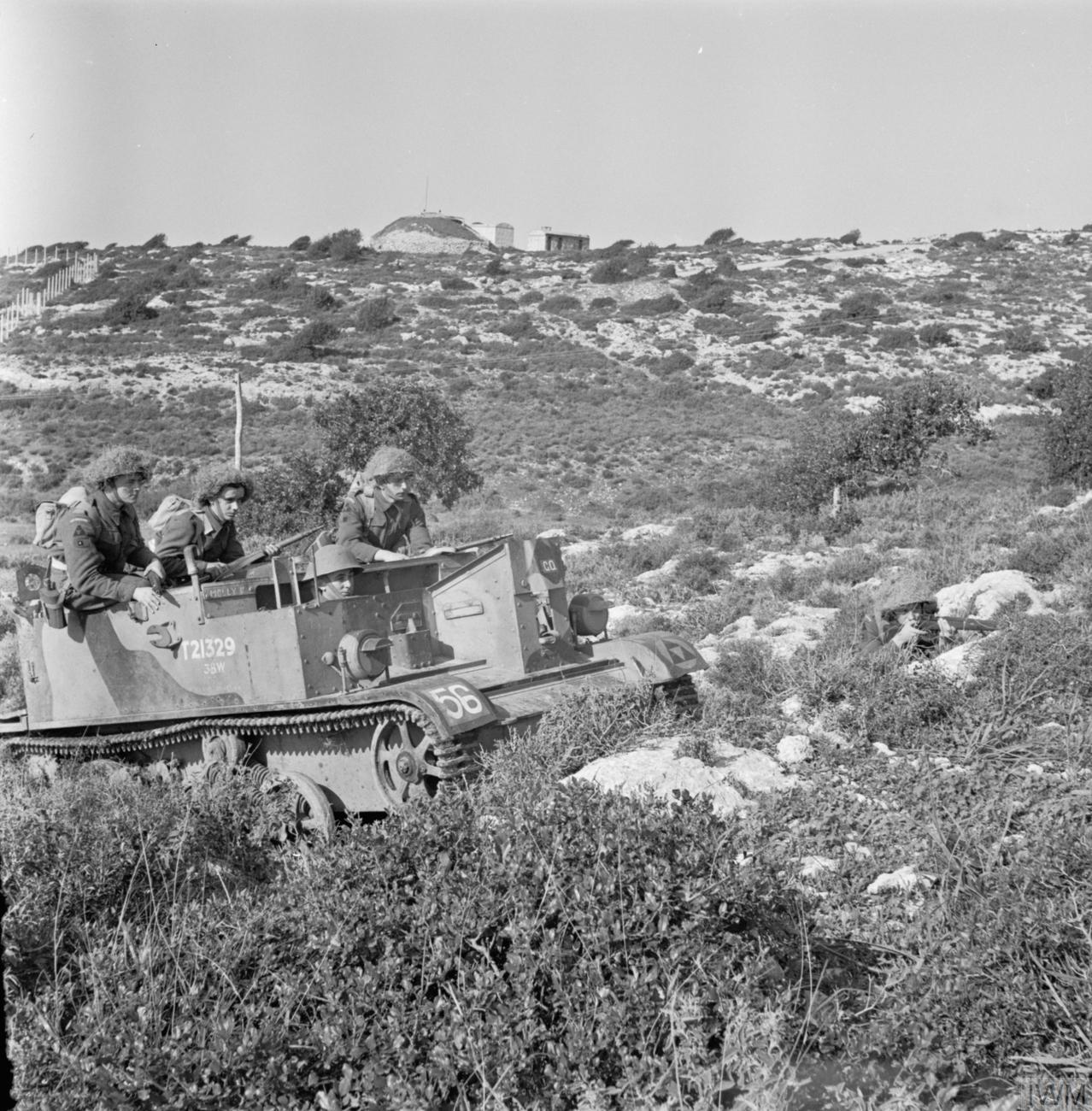
Men of the 2nd Battalion, The East Yorkshire Regiment in a Universal Carrier on field exercise in Palestine

=== After the War ===
The regiment was in Mandatory Palestine during the Zionist insurgency and then took part in the Malayan Emergency in 1953–56 before returning to Germany as part of the British Army of the Rhine. In 1958, it was amalgamated with The West Yorkshire Regiment (The Prince of Wales's Own), to form the Prince of Wales's Own Regiment of Yorkshire.

== Regimental Museum ==
The regimental collection is held by the York Army Museum which is based at the Tower Street drill hall in York.

== The Snappers ==
The London and North Eastern Railway named one of its V2 locomotives, No. 4780 (later No 809 and then British Railways 60809) as The Snapper. The East Yorkshire Regiment. The Duke of York's Own

== Battle honours ==
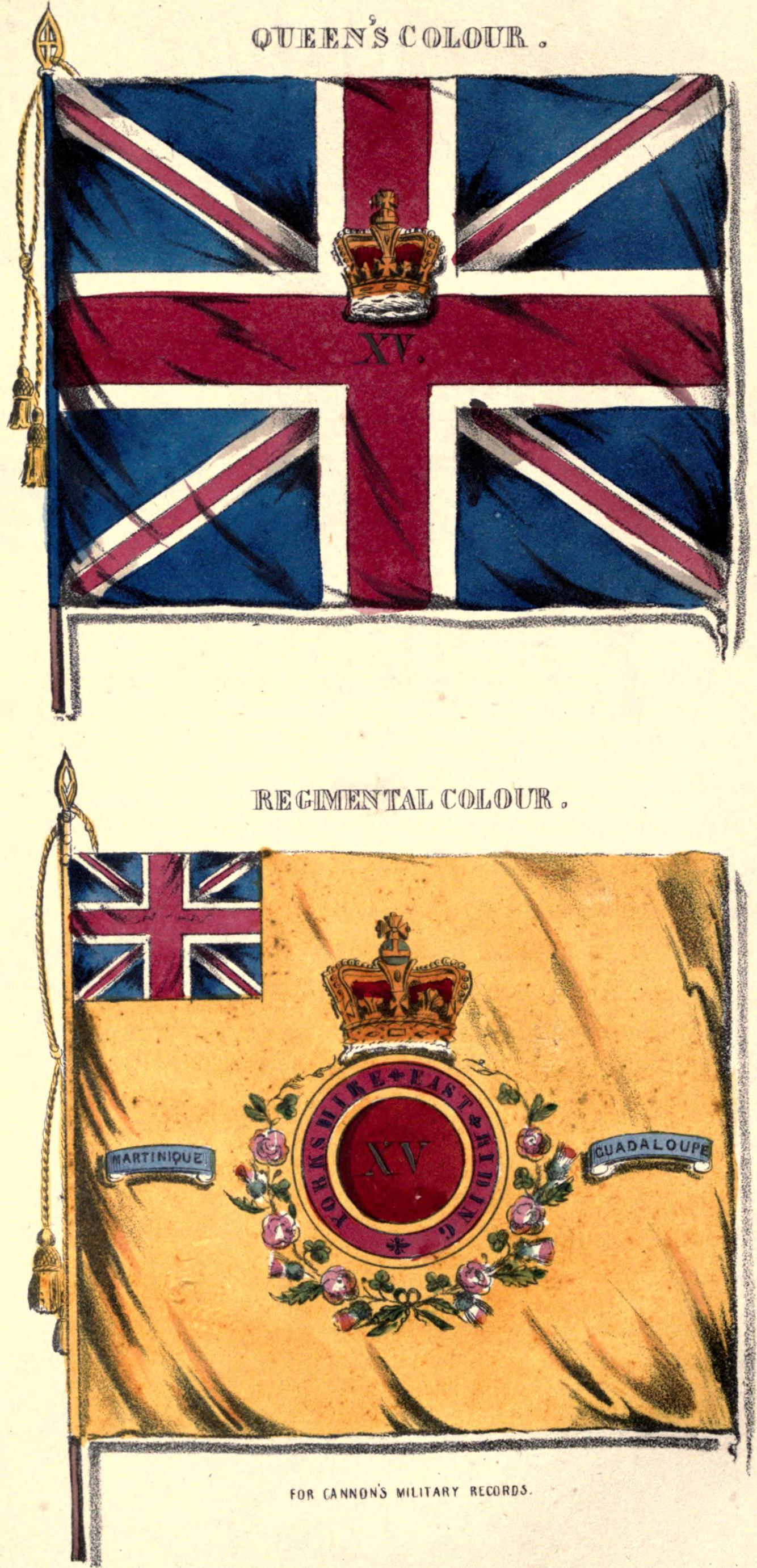
Regulation Queens and regimental colours

The regiment's battle honours were as follows:

- Blenheim, Ramillies, Oudenarde, Malplaquet, Louisburg, Quebec 1759, Martinique 1762, Havannah, St. Lucia 1778, Martinique 1794 1809, Guadeloupe 1810, Afghanistan 1879–80, South Africa 1900–02.
- The Great War (21 battalions): Aisne 1914 '18, Armentières 1914, Ypres 1915 '17 '18, Gravenstafel, St. Julien, Frezenberg, Bellewaarde, Hooge 1915, Loos, Somme 1916 '18, Albert 1916 '18, Bazentin, Delville Wood, Pozières, Flers-Courcelette, Morval, Thiepval, Ancre Heights, Ancre 1916, Arras 1917 '18, Scarpe 1917 '18, Arleux, Oppy, Messines 1917 '18, Pilckem, Langemarck 1917, Menin Road, Polygon Wood, Broodseinde, Poelcappelle, Passchendaele, Cambrai 1917 '18, St. Quentin, Bapaume 1918, Rosières, Lys, Estaires, Hazebrouck, Kemmel, Scherpenberg, Amiens, Hindenburg Line, Épéhy, Canal du Nord, St. Quentin Canal, Selle, Sambre, France and Flanders 1914–18, Struma, Doiran 1917, Macedonia 1915–18, Suvla, Landing at Suvla, Scimitar Hill, Gallipoli 1915, Egypt 1915–16.
- The Second World War: Withdrawal to Escaut, Defence of Escaut, Defence of Arras, French Frontier 1940, Ypres-Comines Canal, Dunkirk 1940, Normandy Landing, Tilly sur Seulles, Odon, Caen, Bourguébus Ridge, Troarn, Mont Pincon, St. Pierre la Vielle, Gheel, Nederrijn, Aam, Venraij, Rhineland, Schaddenhof, Brinkum, Bremen, North-West Europe 1940 '44–45, Gazala, Mersa Matruh, Defence of Alamein Line, El Alamein, Mareth, Wadi Zigzaou, Akarit, North Africa 1942–43, Primosole Bridge, Sicily 1943, Sittang 1945, Burma 1945.

== Victoria Cross recipients ==
The following members of the regiment were awarded the Victoria Cross:

- Private George William Chafer, Great War
- Private John Cunningham, Great War
- Second Lieutenant John Harrison, Great War
- Sergeant Harold Jackson, Great War
- Private Eric Anderson, Second World War

== Colonels of the Regiment ==
Colonels of the regiment included:

- 1685–1686: Col. Sir William Clifton, 3rd Baronet
- 1686–1687: Col. Arthur Herbert, 1st Earl of Torrington
- 1687–1688: Col. Hon. Sackville Tufton
- 1688–1695: Col. Sir James Lesley
- 1695–1709: Lt-Gen. Hon. Emanuel Howe
- 1709–1715: Gen. Algernon Seymour, 7th Duke of Somerset and Earl of Hertford
- 1715–1749: Lt-Gen. Henry Harrison
- 1749–1756: Col. John Jordan

=== The 15th Regiment of Foot ===
- 1756–1768: F.M. Sir Jeffrey Amherst, 1st Baron Amherst, KB
- 1768–1775: Lt-Gen. Sir Charles Hotham-Thompson, 8th Baronet, KB
- 1775–1778: Lt-Gen. Richard Lambart, 6th Earl of Cavan
- 1778–1792: Gen. Sir William Fawcett, KB

=== The 15th (York, East Riding) Regiment ===
- 1792–1794: Gen. James Inglis Hamilton
- 1794–1814: Gen. Henry Watson Powell
- 1814–1846: Gen. Sir Moore Disney, KCB
- 1846–1850: Gen. Sir Phineas Riall, KCH
- 1850–1851: Maj-Gen. Sir Henry Watson, CB
- 1851–1861: Gen. Sir Howard Douglas, 3rd Baronet, GCB, GCMG
- 1861–1868: Lt-Gen. William Booth
- 1868–1877: Gen. Thomas Armstrong Drought
- 1877–1888: Gen. Sir William Montagu Scott McMurdo, GCB

=== The East Yorkshire Regiment ===
- 1888–1889: Gen. Edward George Wynyard
- 1889–1890: Gen. John Hope Wingfield
- 1890–1891: Gen. Robert Bruce
- 1891–1897: Gen. Edward Westby Donovan
- 1897–1901: Lt-Gen. William Hardy, CB
- 1901–1920: Maj-Gen. Sir Coleridge Grove, KCB
- 1920–1925: Maj-Gen. Francis Seymour Inglefield, CB, DSO
- 1925–1930: Maj-Gen. Sir Gerald Farrell Boyd, KCB, CMG, DSO, DCM
- 1930–1933: Brig-Gen. Henry Haggard
- 1933–1940: Brig-Gen. John Louis Justice Clarke, CMG
- 1940–1948: Lt-Gen. Sir Desmond Francis Anderson, KBE, CB, CMG, DSO
- 1948–1958: Brig. Robert John Springhall, CB, OBE (to Prince of Wales's Own Regiment of Yorkshire)
- 1958: Regiment merged with West Yorkshire Regiment to form Prince of Wales's Own Regiment of Yorkshire

== Sources ==
- Bilton, David (2015) Hull in the Great War 1914–1919, Barnsley: Pen & Sword, ISBN 978-1-47382-314-3.
- Bilton, David (2014) Hull Pals, 10th, 11th 12th and 13th Battalions East Yorkshire Regiment – A History of 92 Infantry Brigade, 31st Division, Barnsley: Pen & Sword, ISBN 978-1-78346-185-1.
- Cannon, Richard (2011) [1848]. Historical record of the 15th or the Yorkshire East Riding Regiment of Foot: containing an account of the formation of the regiment in 1685 and of its subsequent services to 1848. CIHM/ICMH Microfiche series = CIHM/ICMH collection de microfiches; no. 48492. Parker Furnivall & Parker. ISBN 9780665484926.
- Joslen, Lt-Col H. F. (2003). Orders of Battle, United Kingdom and Colonial Formations and Units in the Second World War, 1939–1945. Uckfield: Naval & Military Press. ISBN 1-84342-474-6.
- Everard Wyrall, The East Yorkshire Regiment in the Great War 1914–1918, London: Harrison, 1928/Uckfield, Naval & Military, 2002, ISBN 978-1-84342-211-2.
- 1 Btn War Diary 1945 WO 172/7677.
- 1 Btn War Diary 1944 WO 172/4931.
