= Flank company =

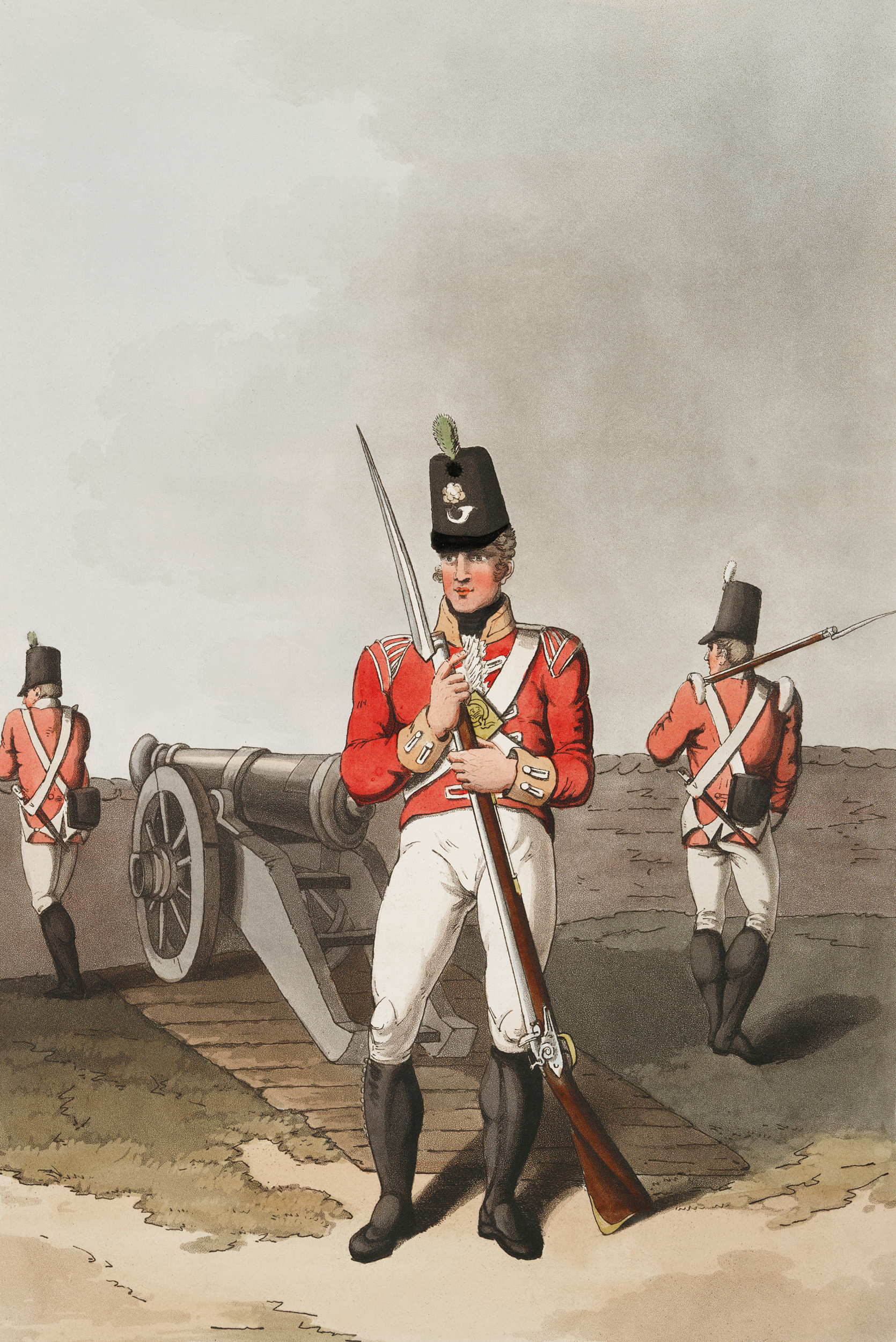
1814 engraving of soldiers of the East York Militia. The light infantryman (centre) and grenadier (right) are both members of flank companies.

A flank company was a former military designation for two elite companies of a regiment. In regimental formation, the grenadier company constituted the right flank of the regiment and the light infantry constituted the left flank, with the other companies of the regiment referred as "battalion companies" or "centre companies". They were still referred to as flank companies even if they were detached from their regiment. Frequently flank companies of several regiments were placed together in their own unit.

Major-General Sir Isaac Brock stated

The chief object of the flank companies is to have constantly in readiness a force comprised of loyal, brave and respectable men.

== Grenadiers ==
The grenadier company comprised the tallest soldiers in the regiment and when in combat were used as assault troops, though by the end of the 18th Century the hand grenade had fallen out of use, the grenadiers still wore a special headgear such as a bearskin or mitre originally designed to facilitate the effective throwing of hand grenades.

In 1667 France created the first Grenadiers by having four or five of them in each company. By 1670 separate Grenadier companies were created with the British Army having Grenadiers in 1685.

Frederick William I of Prussia was renowned for recruiting the tallest soldiers in Europe for his grenadier regiment with various European monarchs presenting their tallest young males as gifts for Frederick.

== Light infantry ==
By contrast the light infantry was composed of the regiment's smallest and fastest moving soldiers in the regiment. Functions of the light infantry in battle included skirmishing, moving forward to discover the enemy's positions and firing on enemy artillery gunners.

Napoleon was adamant on the use of a formation of diminutive troops

Physical difference is perhaps greater than the difference of habits. Big men scorn small men and small men want to demonstrate by their daring and valour that they scorn big men. Light infantrymen are excellent. By opposing big men to small ones is an idea new that belongs to me...In convincing small men that they are worth the same as big ones, they are given the emulation to equal or surpass them.

== Demise ==
In the U.S. Army the flank companies were given the designation of "A" and "B" companies of the lettered companies. With all troops being trained in assault and skirmishing tactics the flank companies were disbanded by the mid 1860s though many regiments still use the titles of Grenadier or Light Infantry.
