= George William Chafer =

Recipient of the Victoria Cross

- Born: 16 April 1894; Bradford, Yorkshire
- Died: 1 March 1966 (aged 71); Bramley, Rotherham
- Burial place: Rotherham Crematorium
- Military career
- Allegiance: United Kingdom
- Branch: British Army
- Rank: Private
- Units: The East Yorkshire Regiment
- Conflicts: World War I
- Awards: Victoria Cross

George William Chafer VC (16 April 1894 – 1 March 1966) was an English recipient of the Victoria Cross, the highest and most prestigious award for gallantry in the face of the enemy that can be awarded to British and Commonwealth forces.

He was 22 years old, and a private in the 1st Battalion, The East Yorkshire Regiment, British Army during the First World War when the following deed took place for which he was awarded the VC.

On 3/4 June 1916 east of Méaulte, Somme, France, during a very heavy bombardment and attack on our trenches, a man carrying an important written message to his commanding officer was half buried and rendered unconscious by a shell. Private Chafer, at once grasping the situation, on his own initiative, took the message from the man's pocket and, although severely wounded, choking and blinded by gas, ran along the ruined parapet under heavy shell and machine-gun fire. He just succeeded in delivering the message before he collapsed from the effects of his wounds.

His Victoria Cross is displayed at The Prince of Wales's Own Regiment of Yorkshire Museum, 3 Tower Street, York, England.
