= 8th (Service) Battalion Lincolnshire Regiment =

8th Service Battalion, Lincolnshire Regiment
- Active: 1914 - 1918
- Country: United Kingdom
- Branch: Army
- Engagements: World War I

The 8th (Service) Battalion Lincolnshire Regiment was a British Army unit established on 15 September 1914 as a part of Kitchener's Third New Army K3.

== Initial Training ==
The Battalion trained at Grimsby during August 1914, and Halton Park, near Tring later in November 1914. The Battalion moved into billets at Leighton Buzzard for the winter of 1914 (there are a series of photographs of the 8th Lincolns marching through Leighton Buzzard in the Imperial War Museum's photograph collection). They are in khaki uniform instead of the hated Kitchener blue. Their kit is the old style leather webbing and they carry what appears to be the older, longer Lee–Enfield rifle.

In the spring of 1915 the Battalion moved to Halton Park Camp, Wendover and miniature rifle practice commenced. After completing the musketry course and a Review by Lord Kitchener, the Battalion moved to Witley Camp North, marching past His Majesty the King and Lord Kitchener, 12 August 1915.

All the Battalion commanders had been in retirement at the outbreak of war. Of the 21st Division in which the 8th Lincolns were attached only 14 officers had any previous experience in the Regular army.

== Active Service ==
The inexperienced Battalion entrained for overseas service at Milton Station on 9 September 1915. On the 10 September 1915 the Battalion left England via Folkestone and sailed to Boulogne. The Battalion's complement was 28 officers, 2 personnel, and 993 Other Ranks. For a week the Battalion stayed in the Watten area before setting off for the front.

=== The Battle of Loos - 25/27 September 1915 ===
The 8th Lincolns (Lieut.-Colonel H. E. Walters) were part of the 63rd Brigade (Brigadier-General N.T. Nickalls), 21st Division (Major-General Forestier-Walker) from XI Corps (Lieutenant-General R.C.B. Haking). They formed part of the General Reserve. The 21st Division had no previous experience of warfare. It should be remembered the 8th Lincolns had only landed in France on 10 September - just a fortnight before the Battle of Loos.

A long and really arduous march took place which led the Battalion to the front and their first engagement of the war. Starting on the evening of 20/21 September the route led them from Watten via Bayenghem, Racquingham, Norrent Fontes, Cauchy, Nieux les Mines, Vermelles, the pit head Fosse 7 and finally beyond Loos. The Brigade's objective was Annay about 1 ½ miles beyond the German's second line of defence.

Most of the time, they marched at night and tented during the day. The men were kept awake by the sound of the guns and bombardment in the chilly, wet, and pouring rain. The advance was agonizingly slow as they neared the front. The roads were jam-packed with wagons, ambulances, walking wounded and German prisoners. The 8th Lincolns soon came under long-range shell-fire from heavy artillery. Tired, wet through and hungry they continued their painfully slow march toward Loos. They were carrying full equipment, including their greatcoats which became even heavier with the rain.

When the Battalion eventually reached the battle zone the advance was extremely difficult and tortuous. It was pitch dark, they had to cross the old British front-line and then the smashed German original front-line trenches. The frontline was littered with the dead and dying. They marched to the sound of rifle and machine-gun fire, the screaming of dying men, shells and loud explosions.

2nd Lieutenant Cragg of the 8th Lincolns described the sight,

"… as we got to the crest-line, now free from obstruction, we could see the countryside slightly, and what a sight met our eyes! Right ahead of us was Loos in flames, this was the glare that puzzled us: the twin towers of the big mine standing out like great oil towers on a burning oil field. To the right and left were the horrors of war".

—

The situation for the officers was very confused. They were only given a compass bearing to march on – they had been told and thought they were pursuing a beaten enemy. This could not have been further from the truth.

At midnight on 25 September there was a sudden burst of rifle and machine gun fire. It was thought from Chalk Pit Wood, the wood was cleared by A company, whilst supported by D company. A Company suffered many casualties.

The night was spent preparing trenches. When dawn broke on 26 September the 8th Lincolns were in a position facing towards Hill 70. Three Companies of the Lincolns opened fire on German targets retiring from Hill 70. However, this action gave away their positions and German artillery responded.

The shallow trenches gave the men a little protection but alas casualties ensued.

The Germans continued shelling and their infantry made their way through Bois Hugo. The Germans attacked [153 Infantry Regiment (8th Division) part of 106 regiment and 178 Regiment (123rd Saxon) Division] from both sides of Bois Hugo engaging A, B and C Companies of the Lincolns. There was a short controlled retirement. Hand-to-hand fighting took place, bayonet charges were tried but were unsuccessful. Lieut.-Colonel H. E. Walter was killed whilst leading his men forward. A counterattack by the Lincolns retook part of Bois Hugo. However, the Germans attacked again and gained complete control of Bois Hugo.

In the late afternoon the Germans rushed the remaining entrenched Lincolns. The dwindling number of Lincolns were almost surrounded and were forced to retire.

Under pressure from the German advance the few officers and men who survived withdrew.

In fact, all officers of the Battalion became casualties, and only four remained. Capt. H. Pattinson being the senior surviving officer assumed command. He was promoted to the rank of major at the age of 20.

The lack of experience caused many unnecessary casualties, and in the heat of the battle officers and NCOs found their training lacking.

In their first battle the 8th Battalion lost 22 of their 24 officers. 471 other ranks were killed, wounded or missing.

The 8th Lincolns were taken out of the line and into billets to receive replacements, for training, periods of work on trench defences, periodical tours of the trenches and working parties.
