= 62nd Brigade (United Kingdom) =

Formation of the British Army

The 62nd Brigade was a formation of the British Army. It was raised as part of the new army also known as Kitchener's Army and assigned to the 21st Division and served on the Western Front during the First World War. Brigadier-General George Gater succeeded Brigadier-General Cecil Rawling as commander of the brigade in November 1917.

== Formation ==
The infantry battalions did not all serve at once, but all were assigned to the brigade during the war.

- 12th (Service) Battalion, Northumberland Fusiliers
- 13th (Service) Battalion, Northumberland Fusiliers
- 8th (Service) Battalion, East Yorkshire Regiment
- 10th (Srervice) Battalion, Yorkshire Regiment
- 1st Battalion, Lincolnshire Regiment
- 3/4th Battalion, Queen's Royal Regiment (West Surrey)
- 2nd Battalion, Lincolnshire Regiment
- 62nd Machine Gun Company
- 62nd Trench Mortar Battery
