= 21st Division (United Kingdom) =

Infantry division of the British Army during World War I

- Active: September 1914 – May 1919
- Country: United Kingdom
- Branch: British Army
- Type: Infantry
- Size: Division
- Engagements: World War I; Battle of Loos; Battle of the Somme; Battle of Arras; Battle of Passchendaele; Battle of Cambrai

The 21st Division was an infantry division of the British Army during World War I, raised in September 1914 by men volunteering for Lord Kitchener's New Armies. The division moved to France in September 1915 and served on the Western Front for the duration of the First World War. The divisional insignia was the "triple-seven".

== History ==
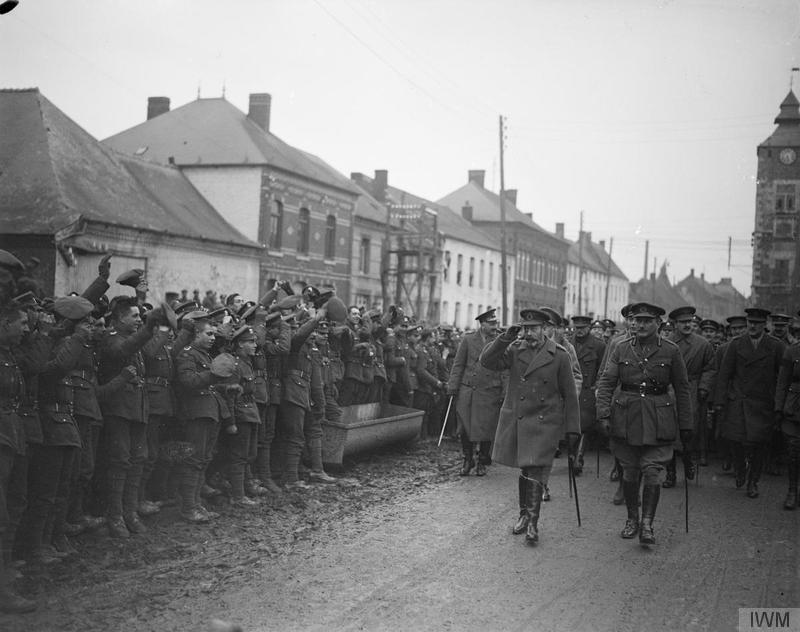
King George V passing down a village street lined by cheering troops of the 21st Division. Photograph was taken near to Le Quesnoy, on 2 December 1918.

The Division was the first of the six created for the Third New Army on 13 September 1914. It moved to France in September 1915. It took part in the Battle of Loos in September 1915, the Battle of the Somme in autumn 1916, the Battle of Arras in April 1917, the Battle of Passchendaele in autumn 1917 and the Battle of Cambrai in November 1917. The division suffered 55,581 killed, wounded and missing, being the highest number of casualties suffered by any New Army division. The Division ceased to exist on 19 May 1919.

== Order of battle ==
The following units served with the division:

62nd Brigade

- 12th (Service) Battalion, Northumberland Fusiliers (renamed 12th/13th battalion in August 1917)
- 13th (Service) Battalion, Northumberland Fusiliers (merged with 12th Northumberland Fusiliers in August 1917)
- 8th (Service) Battalion, East Yorkshire Regiment (left November 1915)
- 1st Battalion, Lincolnshire Regiment (joined November 1915)
- 10th (Service) Battalion, Alexandra, Princess of Wales's Own (Yorkshire Regiment) (disbanded February 1918)
- 3/4th Battalion, Queen's (Royal West Surrey Regiment) (joined August 1917 disbanded 11 February 1918)
- 2nd Battalion, Lincolnshire Regiment (joined February 1918)
- 62nd Machine Gun Company (joined 4 March 1916, transferred into 21st MG Battalion 24 February 1918)
- 62nd Trench Mortar Battery (joined by 16 June 1916)

63rd Brigade

In July 1916 the brigade moved to the 37th Division, swapping with the 110th Brigade.

- 8th (Service) Battalion, Lincolnshire Regiment
- 8th (Service) Battalion, Prince Albert's (Somerset Light Infantry)
- 12th (Service) Battalion, Prince of Wales's Own (West Yorkshire Regiment) (until November 1915)
- 4th Battalion, Duke of Cambridge's Own (Middlesex Regiment) (from November 1915)
- 10th (Service) Battalion, York and Lancaster Regiment
- 63rd Machine Gun Company (joined 4 March 1916)
- 63rd Trench Mortar Battery (joined 16 June 1916)

64th Brigade

- 9th (Service) Battalion, King's Own (Yorkshire Light Infantry)
- 10th (Service) Battalion, King's Own (Yorkshire Light Infantry) (disbanded February 1918)
- 14th (Service) Battalion, Durham Light Infantry (left November 1915)
- 15th (Service) Battalion, Durham Light Infantry
- 1st Battalion, East Yorkshire Regiment (joined November 1915)
- 2nd Battalion, South Lancashire Regiment (attached 21 to 30 June 1918)
- 64th Machine Gun Company (joined 4 March 1916, transferred into 21st MG Battalion 24 February 1918)
- 64th Trench Mortar Battery (joined by 16 June 1916)

110th Brigade (the Leicester Tigers)

In July 1916 the brigade joined from the 37th Division, swapping with the 63rd Brigade. Brigadier-General (temporary) Edward Loch took command on 22 July 1917.

- 6th (Service) Battalion, Leicestershire Regiment
- 7th (Service) Battalion, Leicestershire Regiment
- 8th (Service) Battalion, Leicestershire Regiment (leftJune 1918)
- 9th (Service) Battalion, Leicestershire Regiment (disbanded February 1918)
- 1st Battalion, Duke of Edinburgh's (Wiltshire Regiment) (from June 1918)
- 110th Machine Gun Company (transferred into 21st MG Battalion 24 February 1918)
- 110th Trench Mortar Battery

Divisional Troops

- 14th (Service) Battalion, the Northumberland Fusiliers became Divisional Pioneer Battalion in February 1915
- 13th (Service) Battalion, King’s Royal Rifle Corps (left April 1915)
- 13th (Service) Battalion, Rifle Brigade (left April 1915)
- 237th Machine Gun Company (joined 17 July 1917, transferred into 21st MG Battalion 24 February 1918)
- 21st Battalion Machine Gun Corps (formed 24 February 1918)
- Divisional Mounted Troops
  - A Sqn, South Irish Horse (joined January 1915, left May 1916)
- 21st Divisional Cyclist Company, Army Cyclist Corps (formed February 1915, left 10 May 1916)
- 21st Divisional Train Army Service Corps
  - 182nd, 183rd, 184th and 185th Companies
- 33rd Mobile Veterinary Section Army Veterinary Corps
- 222nd Divisional Employment Company (joined 30 June 1917)

Royal Artillery

- XCIV Brigade, Royal Field Artillery (R.F.A.)
- XCV Brigade, R.F.A.
- XCVI Brigade, R.F.A. (broken up 13 January 1917)
- XCVII (Howitzer) Brigade, R.F.A (broken up 28–31 August 1916)
- 21st Divisional Ammunition Column R.F.A.
- 21st Heavy Battery, Royal Garrison Artillery (R.G.A.) (transferred to XXIII Heavy Artillery Brigade on 21 August 1915)
- V.21 Heavy Trench Mortar Battery R.F.A. (joined 1 June 1916, left February 1918)
- W.21 Medium Mortar Battery R.F.A. (joined May, left August 1916)
- X.21, Y.21 and Z.21 Medium Mortar Batteries R.F.A. 4 x 6-inch mortars each (joined 1–13 March 1916; in February 1918, Z broken up and batteries reorganised to have 6 x 6-inch mortars each)

Royal Engineers

- 85th Field Company (left January 1915)
- 86th Field Company (left February 1915)
- 97th Field Company
- 98th Field Company
- 126th Field Company (joined March 1915)
- 21st Divisional Signals Company

Royal Army Medical Corps

- 63rd Field Ambulance
- 64th Field Ambulance
- 65th Field Ambulance
- 38th Sanitary Section (left 1 April 1917)

== Commanders ==
During its existence, 21st Division had the following commanders:

- 16 September 1914 Lt Gen Edward Hutton
- 11 April 1915 Major-General George Forestier-Walker
- 18 November 1915 Major-General Claud Jacob (wounded, 4 March 1916)
- 4 March 1916 Brig.-General G.M. Gloster (temporary)
- 1 April 1916 Major-General Claud Jacob
- 22 May 1916 Major-General David Campbell

== See also ==
- List of British divisions in World War I

== Bibliography ==
- Becke, Archibald F. (1938). Order of Battle of Divisions Part 3A. New Army Divisions (9–26). London: HMSO. OCLC 4405016.
