= Ypres Reservoir Cemetery =

WWI CWGC cemetery in Ypres, Belgium

Ypres Reservoir
- Commonwealth War Graves Commission
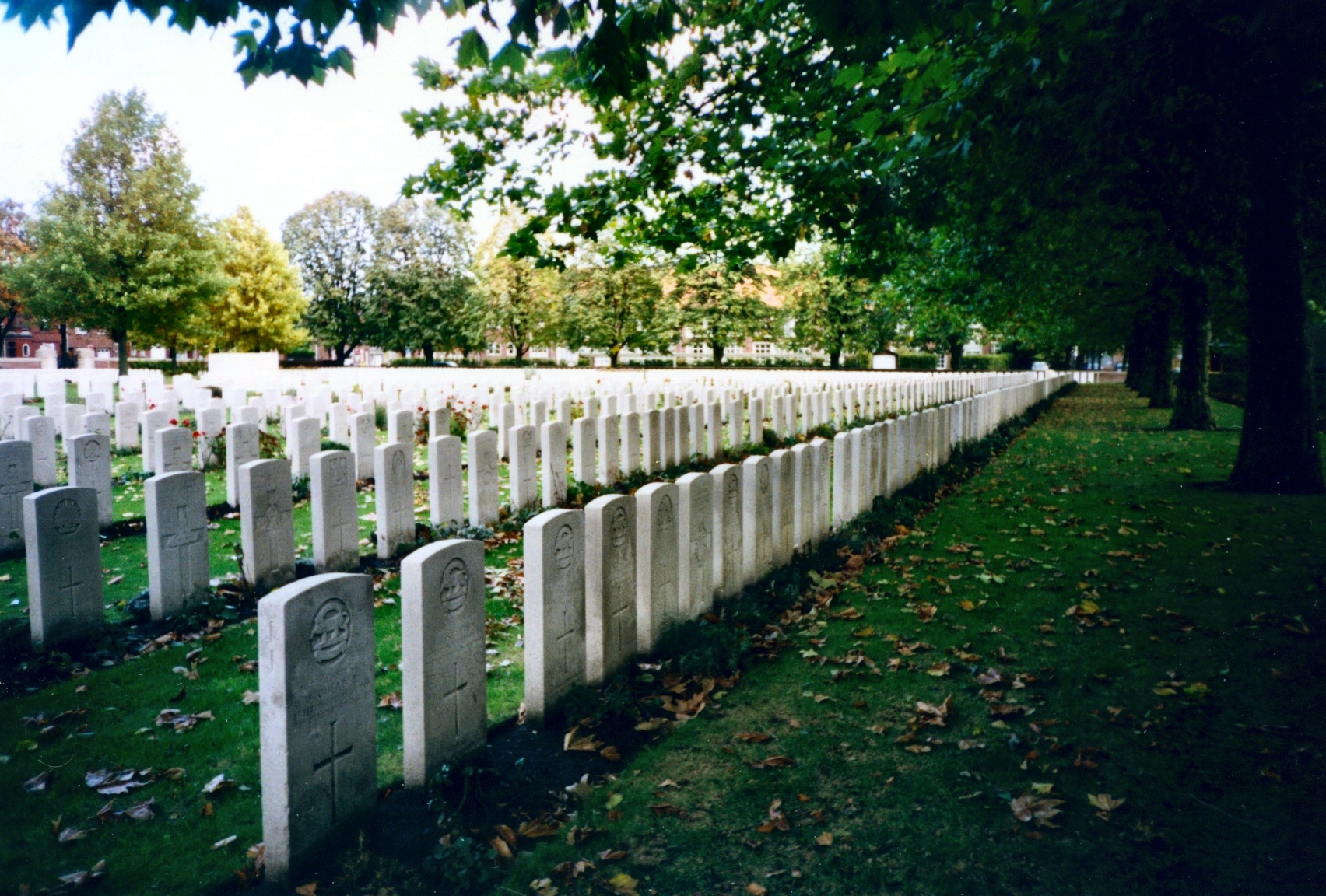
- Used for those deceased 1915–1918
- Established: 1915
- Location: 50°51′12″N 02°52′39″E near Ypres, West Flanders, Belgium
- Designed by: Sir Reginald Blomfield
- Total burials: 2702
- Unknowns: 7

Burials by nation
- Allied Powers: United Kingdom: 2250; Canada: 151; Newfoundland: 4; Australia: 142; New Zealand: 128; South Africa: 12; British West Indies: 6; Undivided India: 1; Central Powers: Germany: 1

Burials by war
- World War I: 2702

Ypres Reservoir Cemetery is a Commonwealth War Graves Commission (CWGC) burial ground for the dead of the First World War located in the Ypres Salient on the Western Front.

The cemetery grounds were assigned to the United Kingdom in perpetuity by King Albert I of Belgium in recognition of the sacrifices made by the British Empire in the defence and liberation of Belgium during the war.

== Foundation ==
The cemetery was founded by Commonwealth troops in October 1915 and remained in use until after the Armistice in November 1918.

It was originally one of three cemeteries in the immediate area. At the end of the war, the Ypres Reservoir South Cemetery (formerly known as "Broadley's Cemetery" and "Prison Cemetery No 1") and the Ypres Reservoir Middle Cemetery (formerly "Middle Prison Cemetery" and "Prison Cemetery No 2") were concentrated into the North cemetery. The cemetery at the Infantry Barracks was also concentrated into the North cemetery, with additional scattered graves from nearby areas added later.

The cemetery was designed by Sir Reginald Blomfield who was also responsible for the nearby Menin Gate memorial.

Also within the cemetery is a cross of sacrifice.

== Notable graves ==
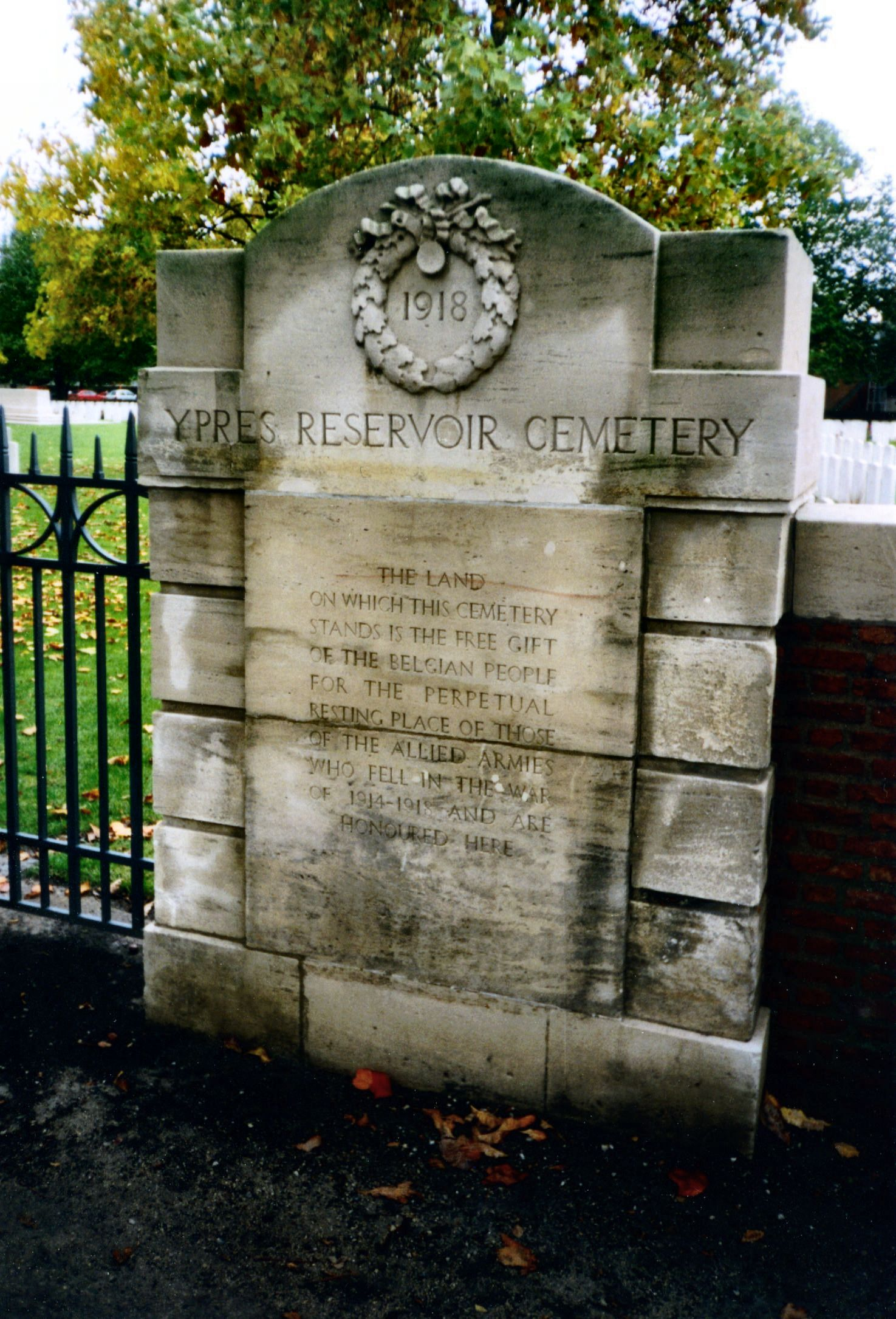
Ypres Reservoir Commonwealth War Graves Commission Cemetery entrance.

The cemetery contains the graves of some 2702 soldiers. Amongst these are the graves of three men executed by the Commonwealth military authorities – Privates Moles, Lawrence and McColl.

Lewis Robertson, who played Rugby union for Scotland, is buried in this cemetery.

Also buried at this cemetery is Brigadier General Francis Aylmer Maxwell, a holder of the Victoria Cross who was killed in Ypres by a sniper in 1917.
