= Victoria Barracks, Beverley =

Victoria Barracks
- Beverley
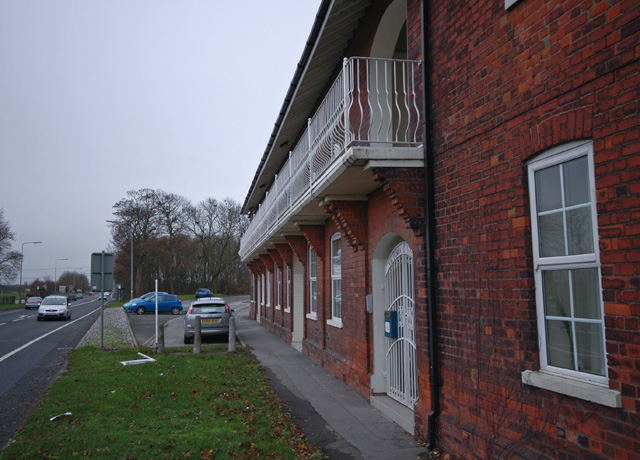
- The building on the right, now converted into flats, is all that remains of the old barracks

Site information
- Type: Barracks
- Owner: Ministry of Defence
- Operator: British Army

Location
- Location within East Riding of Yorkshire
- Coordinates: 53.82313°N 0.44297°W

Site history
- Built: 1877–1878
- Built for: War Office
- In use: 1878-1960

Garrison information
- Occupants: East Yorkshire Regiment

Victoria Barracks was a military installation in Beverley, East Riding of Yorkshire, England.

== History ==
The barracks were built as the depot of the two battalions of the 15th (The Yorkshire East Riding) Regiment of Foot between 1877 and 1878. Their creation took place as part of the Cardwell Reforms which encouraged the localisation of British military forces. Following the Childers Reforms, the 15th Regiment of Foot evolved to become the East Yorkshire Regiment with its depot at the barracks in 1881.

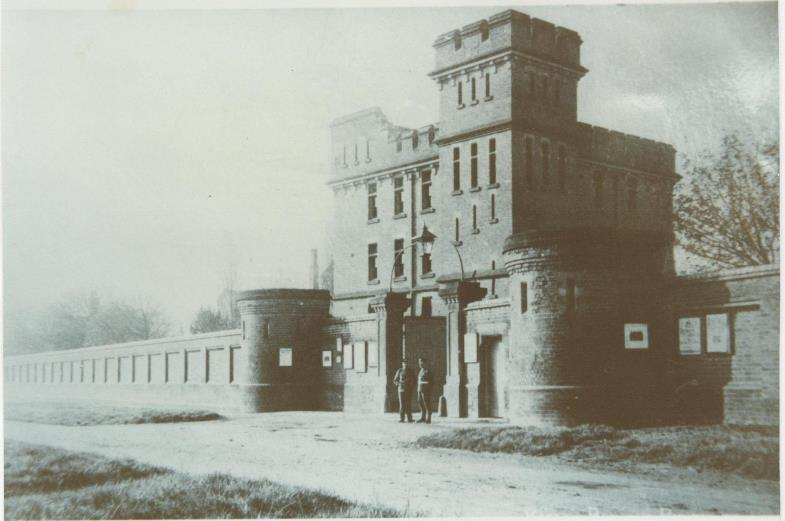
Victoria Barracks in the 1940s

Many recruits enlisted at the barracks at the start of the First World War and the barracks were significantly extended during the Second World War. The Regiment amalgamated with the West Yorkshire Regiment to form the Prince of Wales's Own Regiment of Yorkshire in 1958. Following demolition of the barracks, the Ministry of Defence disposed of the site in 1977 and it is now largely occupied by a Morrisons supermarket.
