= Tyne-Tees Regiment =

- Active: 1999 – 2006
- Allegiance: United Kingdom
- Branch: British Army
- Role: Line Infantry
- Size: One Battalion

Insignia
- Tactical Recognition Flash (1999–2006)

The Tyne-Tees Regiment was a regiment of the British Territorial Army. The regiment was part of 15 (North East) Brigade and was the Territorial unit of infantry in the area stretching from Scarborough in North Yorkshire, to Alnwick in Northumberland.

== History ==
The regiment was formed in 1999 by the amalgamation of the 6th Battalion, The Royal Regiment of Fusiliers, 4th/5th Battalion The Green Howards (Yorkshire Volunteers) and 7th Battalion, The Light Infantry due to the implementation of the reforms of the Territorial Army envisaged in the Strategic Defence Review. The HQ was at Durham, and the regiment was composed of a headquarters company and five companies:

- HQ Company, at Gilesgate Armoury, Durham
- A (Green Howards) Company, at Scarborough and Northallerton
  (from A and C Companies, 4th/5th Battalion, Green Howards)
- B (Green Howards) Company, at Middlesbrough, and Coulby Newham
  (from B and HQ Companies, 4th/5th Battalion, Green Howards)
- C (Durham Light Infantry) Company, at Bishop Auckland, Consett, and Washington
  (from B and C Companies, 7th Battalion, Light Infantry)
- X (Fusilier) Company, at Newcastle upon Tyne and Alnwick
  (from W and X Companies, 6th Battalion, Royal Regiment of Fusiliers)
- Z (Fusilier) Company, at Ashington and Tynemouth
  (from Z Company, 6th Battalion, Royal Regiment of Fusiliers)

No new cap badge was created for this regiment, soldiers wore their former regimental cap badge or were badged according to the company they joined. On 4 July 2003, a composite company was dispatched to Iraq and was the first TA Infantry unit to be compulsorily mobilised since the Suez Crisis in 1956. The three platoons deployed served at Basra Palace, Basra Airport and Shaibah Logistics Base and were rotated around at intervals during this difficult and unstable period in Iraq's history.

In 2004, a platoon was deployed to Iraq as part of Normandy Company of The East and West Riding Regiment. During this tour, Normandy Company suffered one fatality, Private Mark Stephen Dobson of the Tyne-Tees Regiment, who was found dead in his accommodation at Basrah Air Station on 28 March 2005.

As part of the restructuring of the infantry announced in 2004, the Tyne-Tees Regiment was broken up, with its constituent companies going to their parent regiments:

- A & B Companies merged to form B Company, 4th Battalion The Yorkshire Regiment on 6 June 2006.
- X, Z and C Companies formed the 5th Battalion, Royal Regiment of Fusiliers
- Minden (Light Infantry) Company, formerly of The East and West Riding Regiment, was broken up with the Doncaster detachment joining C (Durham Light Infantry) Company as the (Yorkshire Light Infantry) Platoon. The rest of the Wakefield-based Company formed the nucleus of the newly created 299 Parachute Squadron, Royal Engineers.
