= 4th Battalion, Royal Yorkshire Regiment =

The East and West Riding Regiment 4th Battalion The Yorkshire Regiment
- Active: 1999 – present
- Allegiance: United Kingdom
- Branch: British Army
- Role: Line Infantry
- Size: One Battalion

Commanders
- Honorary Colonel: Lieutenant Colonel D. K. Rhodes, TD

The East and West Riding Regiment was a regiment of the British Territorial Army from 1999 to 2006. In 2006, it was re-designated as the 4th Battalion The Yorkshire Regiment.

== History ==
The regiment was formed in 1999 by the amalgamation of the 3rd Battalion The Prince of Wales's Own Regiment of Yorkshire (Yorkshire Volunteers); 3rd Battalion The Duke of Wellington's Regiment (Yorkshire Volunteers); and the King's Own Yorkshire Yeomanry (Light Infantry) due to the reforms implemented in consequence of the Strategic Defence Review. The regimental headquarters was at Pontefract and the regiment, part of 15 (North East) Brigade, comprised five Rifle Companies:

- Ypres Company (Duke of Wellington's Regiment), at Huddersfield and Keighley
  (from C and B Companies, 3rd Battalion, Duke of Wellington's Regiment)
- Fontenay Company (Duke of Wellington's Regiment), at Barnsley and Sheffield
  (from HQ and A Companies, 3rd Battalion, Duke of Wellington's Regiment)
- Quebec Company (Prince of Wales's Own Regiment of Yorkshire), at Hull and Beverley
  (from B Company, 3rd Battalion, Prince of Wales's Own Regiment of Yorkshire)
- Imphal Company (Prince of Wales's Own Regiment of Yorkshire), at Worsley Barracks, York and Leeds
  (from A Company, 3rd Battalion, Prince of Wales's Own Regiment of Yorkshire)
- Minden Company (Light Infantry), at Wakefield and Batley
  (from HQ and C Squadrons, King's Own Yorkshire Yeomanry)

No new cap badge was created for this regiment: soldiers wore their former regimental cap badge or were badged according to the company they joined. The regimental crest was a combination of the Light Infantry and the Prince of Wales's Own Regiment of Yorkshire cap badges and the Duke of Wellington's family crest and motto, used on the Cap badge of the Duke of Wellington's Regiment. During the summer of 2004 the regiment adopted a single Tactical Recognition Flash (TRF) of the White Rose of Yorkshire on a black background (this design was previously used by the 49th (West Riding) Infantry Division between the First and early in the Second World War). The official Army abbreviation for the regiment was "E and WRR".

In November 2004, the regiment dispatched a composite company (Normandy Company) to Basra, Iraq as part of 4th Mechanized Brigade of the Multi-National Division (South East) for a 6-month tour-of-duty.

=== Prior to re-designation ===
Two months prior to being re-designated as the 4th Battalion of The Yorkshire Regiment, the two Yorkshire companies of the Tyne-Tees Regiment were integrated into the structure of the regiment, and some of the regiment's companies were converted into other units; furthermore, the regimental HQ moved to York. This was to ease the re-designation process in June 2006. After this re-structuring, the regiment's structure was as follows:

- HQ Company (later renamed Waterloo Company), at Worsley Barracks, York and Scarborough
  (from Imphal Company, East and West Riding Regiment; and A Company, Tyne-Tees Regiment)
- A Company (Prince of Wales's Own Regiment of Yorkshire), at Hull, Beverley, and Leeds
  (from Quebec Company, and Leeds Platoon, Imphal Company)
- B (Green Howards) Company, at Middlesbrough and Northallerton
  (from B Company, Tyne-Tees Regiment)
- C Company (Duke of Wellington's Regiment), at Huddersfield and Keighley
  (from Ypres Company)
- D Company (Duke of Wellington's Regiment), at Barnsley and Sheffield
  (from Fontenay Company)

Minden Company was broken up, with the Company HQ forming 299 Parachute Engineer Squadron, and the Doncaster Platoon formed C (Rifles) Company, 5th Battalion, Royal Regiment of Fusiliers.

== 4th Battalion The Yorkshire Regiment ==
As part of the Future Infantry Structure (FIS) restructuring of the army announced in 2004, the regiment became the 4th Battalion of the newly created Yorkshire Regiment (14th/15th, 19th and 33rd/76th Foot) on 6 June 2006. The battalion now serves as the reserve infantry battalion for North Yorkshire, South Yorkshire, West Yorkshire, and the East Riding of Yorkshire, with sub-units dispersed throughout all four counties.

In 2020 the reported structure was:

- Alma Company, at Halifax Barracks, Hull
  - Rifle Platoon, at Worsley Barracks, York
- Burma Company, at Fontenay Barracks, Barnsley
  - Rifle Platoon, at Sheffield
- Corunna Company, at Huddersfield
  - Rifle Platoon, at Belle Vue Barracks, Bradford
  - Rifle Platoon, at Harewood Barracks, Leeds
- Helmand Company, at Worsley Barracks, York
- Quebec Company, at Middlesbrough
