= Colonel Tom =

Colonel Tom may refer to:

- Colonel Tom Parker
- Tom Moore (fundraiser), an Honorary Colonel
