= Captain Tom Foundation =

UK-based charitable organisation

The Captain Tom Foundation
- Founded: 5 June 2020
- Type: Charitable organisation
- Registration no.: 1189808
- Website: The Captain Tom Foundation (Archived as at July 2023)

The 1189808 Foundation, formerly The Captain Tom Foundation, is a charitable foundation established in June 2020 to recognise and raise money for organisations supporting the elderly in the United Kingdom. Originally named after Captain Sir Tom Moore, the charity came under criticism for its high costs relative to the grants it gave out, as well as for a spa building the CEO—Moore's daughter Hannah Ingram-Moore—had built at her home in the foundation's name. The Charity Commission began an investigation into the charity in 2022, and in October 2023 a spokesperson for the Ingram-Moore family stated that the organisation was "unlikely to exist" much longer.

Moore's fundraising walks amassed donations of more than £30 million for NHS Charities Together, and was separate from the Captain Tom Foundation.

== History ==
The foundation was established in June 2020 and its declared aim is to recognise and raise money for organisations supporting the elderly in the UK.

Moore's daughter Hannah Ingram-Moore and her husband, Colin, became trustees of the charity in February 2021. In March 2021, the charity proposed employing Hannah on a salary of £60,000 per annum for three days a week and later submitted a revised proposal to appoint her as full time CEO on a salary of £100,000. This was rejected by the Charity Commission for England and Wales in July 2021 as "neither reasonable nor justifiable". A month later, the Charity Commission permitted the charity to appoint Hannah as interim CEO on a salary of £85,000 per year, on a rolling contract for a maximum of nine months.

In its first year, the Captain Tom Foundation spent £240,000 on management and fundraising costs, while just £160,000 was given away in charitable grants. During that year payments of £37,942 were made to Maytrix Group Limited, a company under the joint control of Colin and Hannah Ingram-Moore, in respect of website costs (£5,030), photography costs (£550), office rental (£4,500), telephone costs (£656) and third-party consultancy costs (£27,205); reimbursement of costs of £16,097 were made to Club Nook Limited (a company under the control of Hannah Ingram-Moore) for accommodation, security and transportation, and payments of £1,686 to her in respect of motor, post, subscription and travel costs.

Between 2021 and 2022, Hannah Ingram-Moore helped to judge awards ceremonies for the Virgin Media O2 Captain Tom Foundation Connector Awards, which included the name of the foundation and its logo on awards plaques. She was paid £18,000 in appearance fees to her family company, Maytrix Group, of which £16,000 went to the Ingram-Moores and £2,000 went to the Captain Tom Foundation.

In February 2022, the Charity Commission announced it would review the charity's accounts. On 30 June 2022, the Charity Commission opened a statutory inquiry into the charity due to questions regarding its financial relationship with members of the Ingram-Moore family.

In July 2023, the Ingram-Moores were ordered to demolish an unauthorised spa building at their Grade II-listed home in Marston Moreteyne, Bedfordshire. The "Captain Tom Foundation Building" had been intended to be used by the Captain Tom Foundation, but plans for the partly constructed building were retrospectively revised to contain a spa pool, shower, toilets and a kitchen. Independent trustees of the Captain Tom Foundation said they were not aware of planning permission sought by the Ingram-Moores in the foundation's name.

In July 2023, the charity said it had stopped taking donations pending the findings of the Charity Commission's inquiry. In October 2023, the Ingram-Moores' barrister stated that the charity was "unlikely to exist" much longer. On 3 July 2024, the Charity Commission verified that the Ingram-Moores had been disqualified from being charity trustees and "from holding an office or employment with senior management functions in charities."

In January 2025, the charity was renamed The 1189808 Foundation.

== Club Nook Limited ==
Club Nook Limited, a private company owned by the Ingram-Moores and their two children, owns 11 trademarks related to Moore, including "Captain Tom", "Sir Tom Moore", "Captain Sir Tom", "Captain Tom Moore", "Walk with Tom", "Colonel Tom", "Colonel Tom Moore" and "Tomorrow will be a good day". In 2022, Hannah Ingram-Moore told The Times that "Club Nook has not profited from branded merchandise/memorabilia, that Club Nook has not been paid by the foundation for use of its trademarks and that Club Nook's revenues have been generated by other activities". Club Nook recorded £809,663 in revenue in its first year. In 2023, the family admitted that the vast majority of this income had come from the sale of three books Moore wrote before he died, seemingly in contradiction to a statement Hannah had made to The Times a year earlier. The family kept the Club Nook income, despite the prologue of one of the books and the charity's website stating that the money would support the Captain Tom Foundation.

== Merchandise ==
In January 2021, World of Roses began selling a potted Captain Tom Rose, with £2.50 of every rose sold being donated to the Captain Tom Foundation. The rose was withdrawn from sale a year later after the Charity Commission announced it had begun a statutory inquiry into the charity. In April 2021, Otterbeck Distillery began selling Captain Tom Gin for £100 per bottle, with all profits being donated to the Captain Tom Foundation. The gin was withdrawn from sale a year later after a breach of charity law. Timothy Taylor's Havercake Ale was sold with 10p per pint being donated to the Captain Tom Foundation. The children's book One Hundred Reasons to Hope, published by Puffin Books in June 2022, pledged £1 to the Captain Tom Foundation for all hardback books sold in the United Kingdom and Ireland.
