= Zinaida Korneva =

Soviet-Russian World War II veteran and charity fundraiser (1922–2021)

- Native name: Russian: Зинаида Корнева
- Born: Zinaida Antonovna Blokhina; 27 September 1922; Isayevo-Dedovo, Orenburg Governorate, Russian SFSR
- Died: 12 October 2021 (aged 99) Saint Petersburg, Russia
- Branch: Air Surveillance, Warning and Communication Forces
- Service years: 1941–1945
- Rank: Sergeant
- Children: 1
- Website: https://zinastories.com/eng

Zinaida Antonovna Korneva (Russian: Зинаида Антоновна Корнева; née Blokhina (Блохина); 27 September 1922 – 12 October 2021) was a Soviet and Russian military veteran of the Second World War and a charity fundraiser.

During the Second World War Korneva served in the air surveillance forces as head of an observation post. On 25 April 2020, at the age of 97, she began a charity event "The Stories of Zinaida Korneva", in which she wrote down stories and posted to YouTube about her life and the Great Patriotic War to raise money in support of Russian doctors during the COVID-19 pandemic. The Russian Society of Veterans (pensioners) of war, labour, the Armed Forces and law enforcement helped in the collection and distribution of charitable funds. The videos were published by friends and family on the YouTube channel and attracted attention not only in Russia, but in other countries. 4.5 million rubles were collected.

== Wartime service and career ==
Blokhina was born an ethnic Russian in the village of Isayevo-Dedovo (now Oktyabrskoye, Orenburg Oblast) to an accountant and a housewife. After graduating from school, she entered the Bashkir-Tatar Pedagogical School in the city of Buguruslan.

Blokhina was conscripted in spring 1942, and after a course in military skills in Kalmykia, she was drafted into the Soviet Armed Forces in early May. During her studies, she improved her shooting skills, studied the types of aircraft using classified albums. In the summer of 1942, as part of the 44th separate battalion, Air Surveillance troops were transferred to Rostov Oblast, where observation posts were deployed to defend Stalingrad. In November 1942, she was appointed head of the observation post. She was credited with 239 correctly identified enemy aircraft. During the summer of 1943, the battalion was transferred to Kharkov and united with the First Ukrainian Front. As part of the 1st Ukrainian Front, she saw action throughout the battles to push occupying forces from Ukraine and participated in the liberation of Poland. In April and May 1945 the Air Surveillance battalion, in which Blokhina served, took part in the operation to liberate Breslau (now Wroclaw). She was in the suburb of Olau (Olava) on 9 May, when the German surrender was announced.

In 1946, Blokhina married Boris Georgievich Kornev and moved to Leningrad. They had a daughter, Olga Borisovna Korneva. In 1946 Korneva began to work as a teacher at the male school number 330. In 1952 she quit for health reasons. After that, she worked at the defense enterprise «Signal» in the technical control department. She was the secretary of the Party organization, worked with the Komsomol members on the history of the party, was the secretary of the district electoral commission - for which she received the Order of the Badge of Honour on 26 April 1971.

On 2 October 2020, Korneva was awarded a commemorative medal of the IC of Russia "75 years of Victory in the Great Patriotic War of 1941–1945."

== Zinaida Korneva's initiative ==
In 2020, Korneva learned about British veteran Tom Moore, who began raising funds as part of the NHS Charities Together to support the UK's National Health Service. Inspired, Zinaida decided to hold the same action in Russia. On 25 April 2020, a fundraising campaign was announced to support doctors, working in the COVID-19 pandemic, and the project "Appeal to Tom Moore" was launched.

Together with you, we defeated fascism in 45, and now we are fighting this virus together.

— YouTube channel of Zinaida Korneva

Fundraising to help doctors began on 1 May. Later, a YouTube channel was launched on which the veteran told stories about the war and her life in support of the initiative. The Russian media covered the initiative.

On 4 May the BBC News TV channel interviewed Korneva and released a report on her initiative. The next day, news agencies Associated Press and Reuters included the news about the project in their feeds. Zinaida gave an interview to western TV channels ABC News, French and English editions of Radio-Canada. On 9 May social advertising was placed on 100 main screens and banner boards in her hometown, at the initiative of the city hall.

Within two weeks of the launch of the aid initiative, the mission raised 3,000,000 rubles to help the families of doctors who died from COVID-19. On 20 May, a teleconference was organized between Britain and Russia, during which Zinaida Korneva was able to talk with British colleague Sir Tom Moore.

=== Recognition ===
The United Nations expressed its appreciation of Korneva's contribution to the fight against COVID-19. By 6 June the amount collected reached 4,000,000 rubles. 135 families from different regions received assistance from these funds. On 17 June the city administration of Saint Petersburg filed a petition to award Korneva the Decoration "For Beneficence", "For significant personal contribution to the development of volunteerism, preservation of the traditions of mercy, gratuitous assistance aimed at combating the spread of socially dangerous diseases".

On 24 June she attended the Victory Parade online and a teleconference with the governor of Saint Petersburg. On 27 June she became one of the participants in a teleconference with President Vladimir Putin, during which she explained why she had decided to begin fundraising. The President thanked Zinaida and emphasized how amazing it is that at such a solid age, a veteran finds the strength to help other people as well.

On 6 July Valery Fadeyev, Chairman of the Human Rights Council under the President of the Russian Federation, conveyed a letter of gratitude to Zinaida Korneva and discussed with her the support of doctors' families. On 30 July Zinaida Korneva and her relative Dmitry Panov, coordinator of the project to help doctors, addressed the TEDx conference. In their report “Pandemic of Solidarity: Doctors are not abandoned in battle,” they talked about the unique volunteer experience of organizing fundraising for the families of health workers who died from COVID-19.

On 27 August 2020, the project “Zinaida Korneva's Initiative” received the National Award “Media Manager of Russia-2020”. The award was received by Dmitry Panov, a member of the family of Zinaida Korneva, managing partner of Wallet One / RNKO "Edinaya Kassa". On 23 November 2020, the President of the Russian Federation awarded Zinaida the Distinction Badge "For Beneficence". “To award Zinaida Antonovna Korneva, the city of St. Petersburg, with a Distinction Badge 'For Beneficence', the city of St. Petersburg, for her great contribution to charitable and social activities,” the document says. On 10 December 2020, Sergei Shabanov, Commissioner for Human Rights in the Saint Petersburg Region, on behalf of the Commissioner for Human Rights in the Russian Federation Tatyana Moskalkova, presented the «Hurry to Do Good» Award to the 98-year-old Korneva.

== Death ==
Korneva died on 12 October 2021 in Saint Petersburg, at the age of 99.
