= York Medal =

- Service ribbon of the medal
- Type: Commemorative military medal
- Awarded for: Contribution to the Royal Yorkshire Regiment
- Presented by: Royal Yorkshire Regiment
- Eligibility: Members of the Royal Yorkshire Regiment, and civilians

The York Medal is an annual, regiment wide, commemorative medal presented to an individual from the British Army's Yorkshire Regiment who has been considered to have made the greatest contribution to the aims of the Regiment over the course of the previous year.

== Medal ==
The Yorkshire Regiment Medal is circular in shape.

- Obverse: the badge of the Royal Yorkshire Regiment with the inscription THE YORKSHIRE REGIMENT.
- Ribbon: a broad central red stripe, flanked each side by a stripe of black, with an outer stripe of khaki green, the regimental colours.

== List of recipients ==
- 2020: Captain Sir Tom Moore, veteran of 8th Battalion, Duke of Wellington's Regiment
- 2021: Sergeant Chris Clarke, 4th Battalion
- 2022: WO1 (RSM) Steven Greenwood, 2nd Battalion, The Yorkshire Regiment.
- 2023: WO2 (CSM) Ross Willis, 2nd Battalion, The Royal Yorkshire Regiment.
- 2024: Maj Ryan Bowness, 2nd Battalion, The Royal Yorkshire Regiment.
