= Malgir =

Village in Nangarhar Province, Afghanistan

- Location within Afghanistan
- Coordinates: 31°44′24″N 64°25′18″E
- Country: Afghanistan
- Province: Helmand Province
- District: Gereshk District

Malgir is a village in Gereshk District in Helmand Province in Afghanistan. It is located approximately 15 kilometres southwest of Gereshk. In recent years the area has been subject to many conflicts with the British army and the Taliban.

On 1 February 2010, two soldiers, from 3rd Battalion, The Yorkshire Regiment (Duke of Wellington's), whom Prince Harry had served with while on training at Suffield in Canada, were killed in separate road side blasts near Malgir, whilst on base security patrols.

== See also ==
- Helmand Province
