= Tower Street drill hall, York =

Military building in York, England

Tower Street drill hall
- York
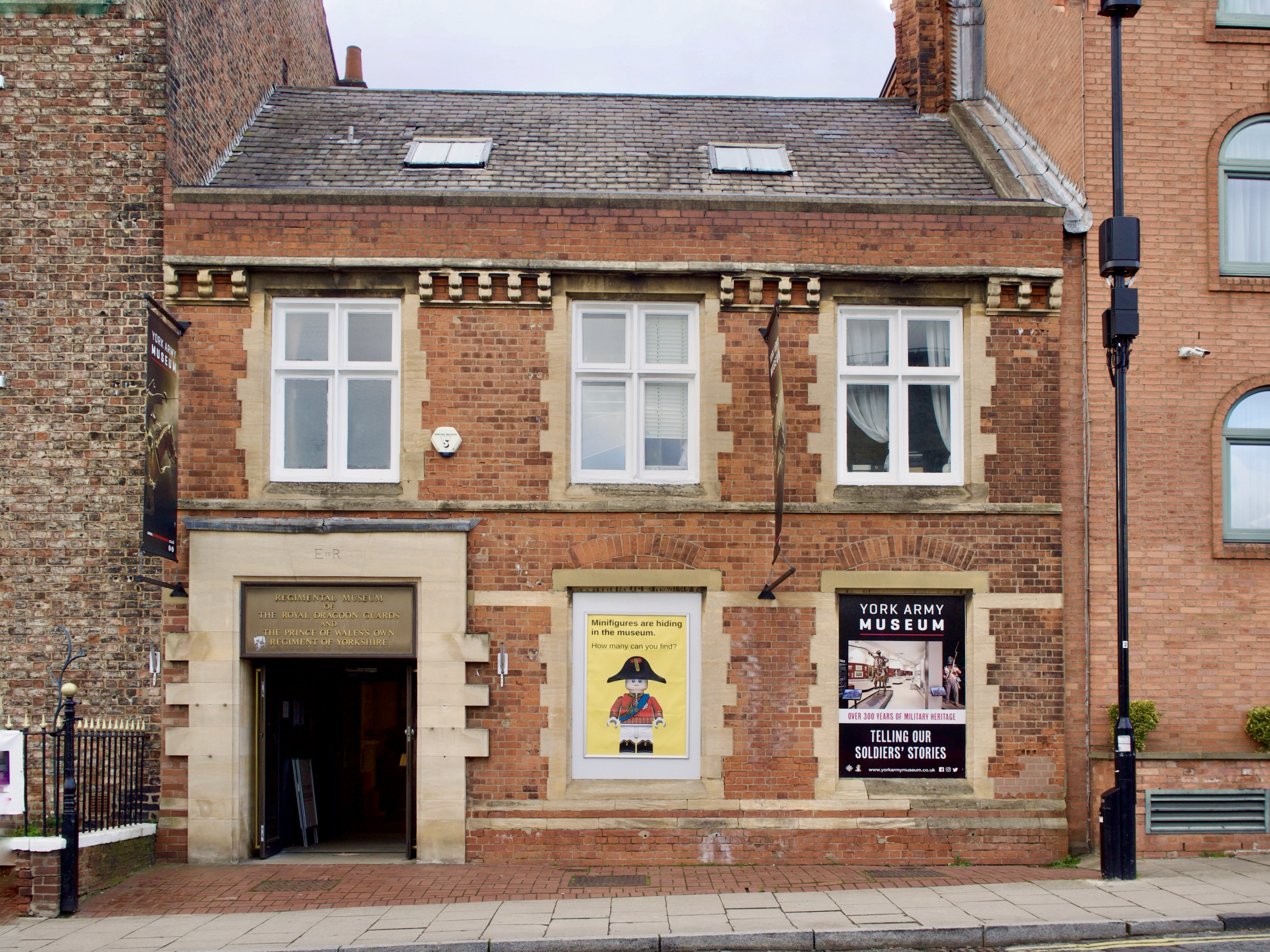
- Tower Street drill hall

Site information
- Type: Drill hall

Location
- Location within North Yorkshire
- Coordinates: 53.95619°N 1.08100°W

Site history
- Built: 1885
- Built for: War Office
- In use: 1885-Present

The Tower Street drill hall is a military installation on Tower Street, York. It is the Regimental Headquarters of the Royal Yorkshire Regiment. It is also home to the York Army Museum.

== History ==
The building, which was designed as the headquarters of the 6th and 7th companies, the 1st East Riding of Yorkshire Artillery Volunteers, was completed in 1885. The unit evolved to become the 9th (West Riding and Staffordshire) Medium Brigade, Royal Garrison Artillery in 1920 and 54th (West Riding and Staffordshire) Medium Brigade, Royal Garrison Artillery in 1921 before relocating to Lumley Barracks in York in 1924.

Meanwhile the drill hall had also become the headquarters of the Yorkshire Hussars early in the 20th century. The unit evolved to become the Queen's Own Yorkshire Yeomanry in 1956 but relocated to more modern facilities at Yeomanry Barracks in York.

Instead the building became the regimental headquarters of the Prince of Wales's Own Regiment of Yorkshire in 1958 and of its successor regiment, the Yorkshire Regiment, in 2006.

== Museum ==
The building also became home to a military museum, subsequently known as the York Army Museum, in 1984. The museum inherited the collections of the Royal Dragoon Guards and of the Prince of Wales's Own Regiment of Yorkshire and is creating a collection on behalf of the Yorkshire Regiment. Following an expansion of the museum financed by the Heritage Lottery Fund, the Duke of York visited the building in May 2015.
