= 15th Infantry Brigade (United Kingdom) =

Former infantry brigade of the British Army

15th Brigade 1st Rhine Brigade 15th Infantry Brigade 15 (North East) Brigade
- Merlin Insignia of 15 (North East) Brigade
- Active: 1905–1948; 1982–2014
- Country: United Kingdom
- Branch: British Army
- Type: Infantry; Regular and Territorial Army
- Size: Brigade
- Part of: Support Command
- Garrison/HQ: Imphal Barracks, York
- Engagements: First World War: Battle of Mons; Battle of Le Cateau; First Battle of Ypres; Battle of the Somme; Third Battle of Ypres; Vimy Ridge; Battle of Épehy; Second World War: Norwegian Campaign; Operation Husky; Italian Campaign; North West Europe Campaign; Post War: Battle of Surabaya

The 15th Infantry Brigade, later 15 (North East) Brigade, was an infantry brigade of the British Army. It was part of the regular 5th Infantry Division during the First World War and Second World War, and was subsequently part of the 2nd Infantry Division in the north of the United Kingdom, with specific responsibility for the areas of North East England and Yorkshire and the Humber.

== History ==
=== Formation ===
The 15th Infantry Brigade was first formed in 1905 at Fermoy and up to the outbreak of the First World War continued to serve in Ireland. The Brigade, which at that time consisted of 1st Battalion, Norfolk Regiment, 1st Battalion, Dorset Regiment, 1st Battalion, Cheshire Regiment and 2nd Battalion, Highland Light Infantry, was mobilized on 5 August 1914 and crossed to France as part the 5th Division with the British Expeditionary Force.

=== First World War ===
During the opening months of the War, the Brigade had its full share of fighting and saw action at Mons, Le Cateau, at the crossings of the Marne and Aisne and in the first battles in Flanders.

The Brigade has chosen Ypres, November 1914, as the Brigade Battle and there is an annual Brigade Dinner to celebrate it. The Brigade fought in all four battles of Ypres.

The Brigade distinguished itself in various battles. One of the most notable was the attack on Hill 60 near Ypres in 1915. Hill 60 was the highest point on what was known as the "Caterpillar Ridge" and as such was an excellent post for observation of the ground area around Zillebeke and Ypres. The 5th Division, composed of 13th, 14th and 15th brigades, had the task of securing Hill 60 and the ridge line. The Hill was taken between 17 and 19 April 1915, with heavy losses, and the subsequent German counterattack in early May was particularly ferocious. The Germans, unable to obtain victory, eventually resorted to the use of chlorine gas and Brigade casualties during the first week in May 1915 were 33 officers and 1,553 men. However, the line was held until reliefs were brought forward and the Brigade withdrawn.

The last battle of the Great War in November 1918 found 15th Brigade in the forefront of the advance, east of the River Sambre.

==== Order of battle ====
- 1st Battalion, Norfolk Regiment
- 1st Battalion, Bedfordshire Regiment (to 1 Nov 1918)
- 1st Battalion, Cheshire Regiment
- 1st Battalion, Dorsetshire Regiment (to November 1915)
- 1/6th Battalion, Cheshire Regiment (from 17 December 1914 to 1 Mar 1915)
- 1/6th (Rifle) Battalion, King's Regiment (Liverpool) (from 27 February 1915 to 18 November 1915)
- 16th (Service) Battalion, Royal Warwickshire Regiment (from 26 December 1915 to 4 October 1918)
- 15th Machine Gun Company, Machine Gun Corps (formed 27 December 1915, moved to 5th Battalion, Machine Gun Corps 26 April 1918)
- 15th Trench Mortar Battery (formed April 1916)

=== The Inter-War Years ===
Following the war the 15th Brigade returned to Belfast where it commanded 1st Battalion, Dorsetshire Regiment, 1st Battalion, Somerset Light Infantry, 1st Durham Light Infantry and 1st Battalion, King's Royal Rifle Corps. In 1924 the 15th Brigade moved to Germany as part of the British Army of the Rhine and was renamed 1st Rhine Brigade. The Brigade was reformed, as 15th Infantry Brigade in October.

=== Second World War ===
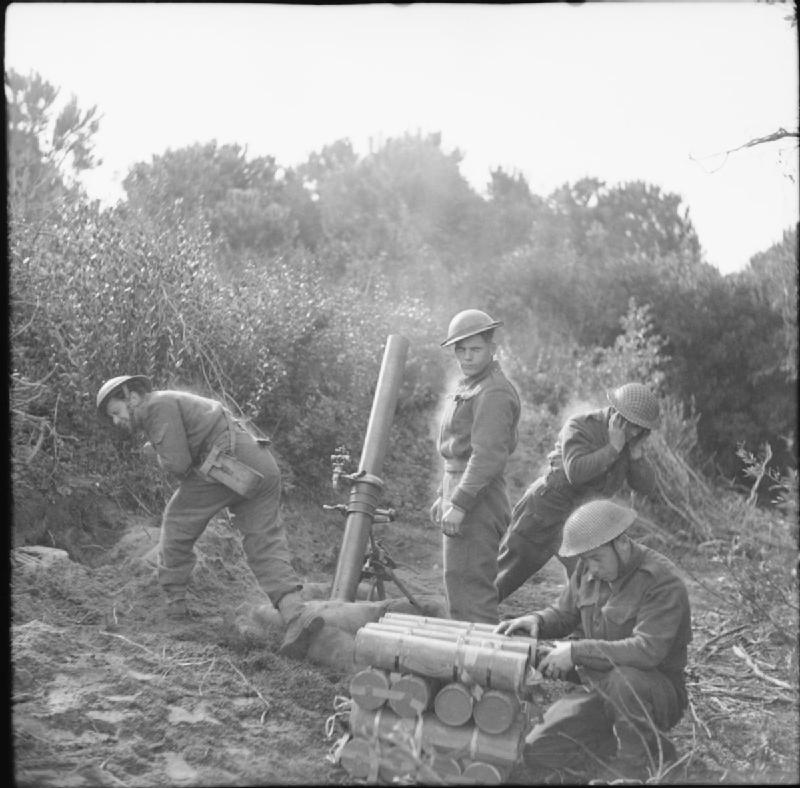
4.2-inch mortar of 15th Brigade Mortar Support Company in action in the Anzio bridgehead, Italy, 16 March 1944.

The brigade was formed from regular units on the outbreak of war on 3 September 1939. When the 5th Division was sent to France late 1939, the 15th Brigade was sent instead in May to Norway, as part of Sickleforce to participate in the unsuccessful Norwegian Campaign, under the command of Lieutenant-General H.R.S.Massey. The brigade was reunited with the 5th Division on 3 August.

The Brigade served with this formation for the rest of the war, seeing action in the Allied invasion of Sicily in July 1943 and Italian Campaign later in the year. After participating in the later stages of the Battle of Anzio, the brigade was deployed to garrison duties in the Middle East before being transferred to North-western Europe on 3 March 1945. The brigade was disbanded in Hanover on 31 March 1948.

==== Order of battle ====
- 1st Battalion, Green Howards
- 1st Battalion, King's Own Yorkshire Light Infantry
- 1st Battalion, York and Lancaster Regiment

=== Reformation ===
The Brigade was reformed in 1982, as a Territorial Army formation, which in turn was part of the 2nd Infantry Division. The Brigade's Headquarters were at Alanbrooke Barracks and its first commander in this new role was Brigadier Michael Aris. Its organisation and role were tested in Exercise Keystone in 1983, when it consisted of:

- Queen's Own Yeomanry
- 6th Battalion, Royal Regiment of Fusiliers
- 7th Battalion, The Light Infantry
- 1st Battalion, Yorkshire Volunteers
- 2nd Battalion, Yorkshire Volunteers
- 101st (Northumbrian) Field Regiment, Royal Artillery (V)

In 1999, having been a territorial formation for many years, the brigade was made responsible for both regular and territorial units in the North East, when the Second Division became a "Regenerative Division", responsible for the north of England and Scotland.

This brigade was merged with the former 4th Mechanised Brigade to become the Headquarters North East section of 4th Infantry Brigade and Headquarters North East based in Catterick.

== Role and Structure ==
In 1989 the 15th Infantry Brigade, (at that time a Reserve Brigade), had the following structure

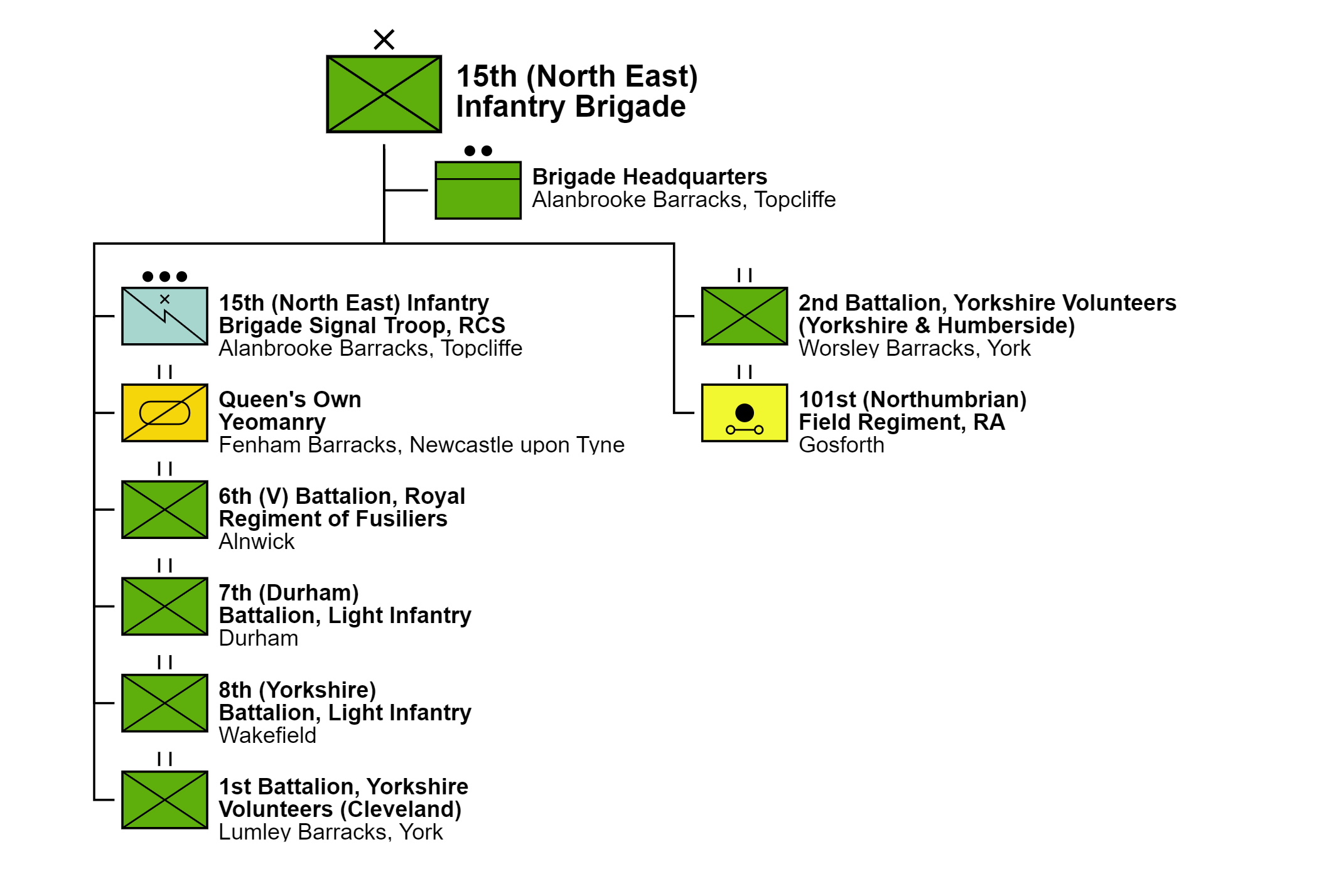
15th Infantry Brigade (TA)

Structure 1989:

- HQ 15th Infantry Brigade and Signal Troop, Royal Signals (V)
- Queen's Own Yeomanry (V)
- 1st (Cleavland) Battalion, Yorkshire Volunteers (V)
- 2nd (Yorkshire and Humberside) Battalion, Yorkshire Volunteers (V)
- 6th Battalion, Royal Regiment of Fusiliers (V)
- 7th (Durham) Battalion, The Light Infantry (V)
- 8th (Yorkshire) Battalion, The Light Infantry (V)
- 101st (Northumbrian) Field Regiment, Royal Artillery (V)
- 269th (West Riding) Observation Post Battery, Royal Artillery (V)

15th (North East) Brigade was a Regional Brigade responsible for the recruiting of soldiers and Officers for the Regular and Territorial Army. It trained the Territorial Army for operations, provided a command and control focus for all military support to civilian authorities during civil emergencies e.g. flooding and was responsible for providing the "Firm Base" to the Regular Army within its area. The brigade had its headquarters at Imphal Barracks in York and included the following units:

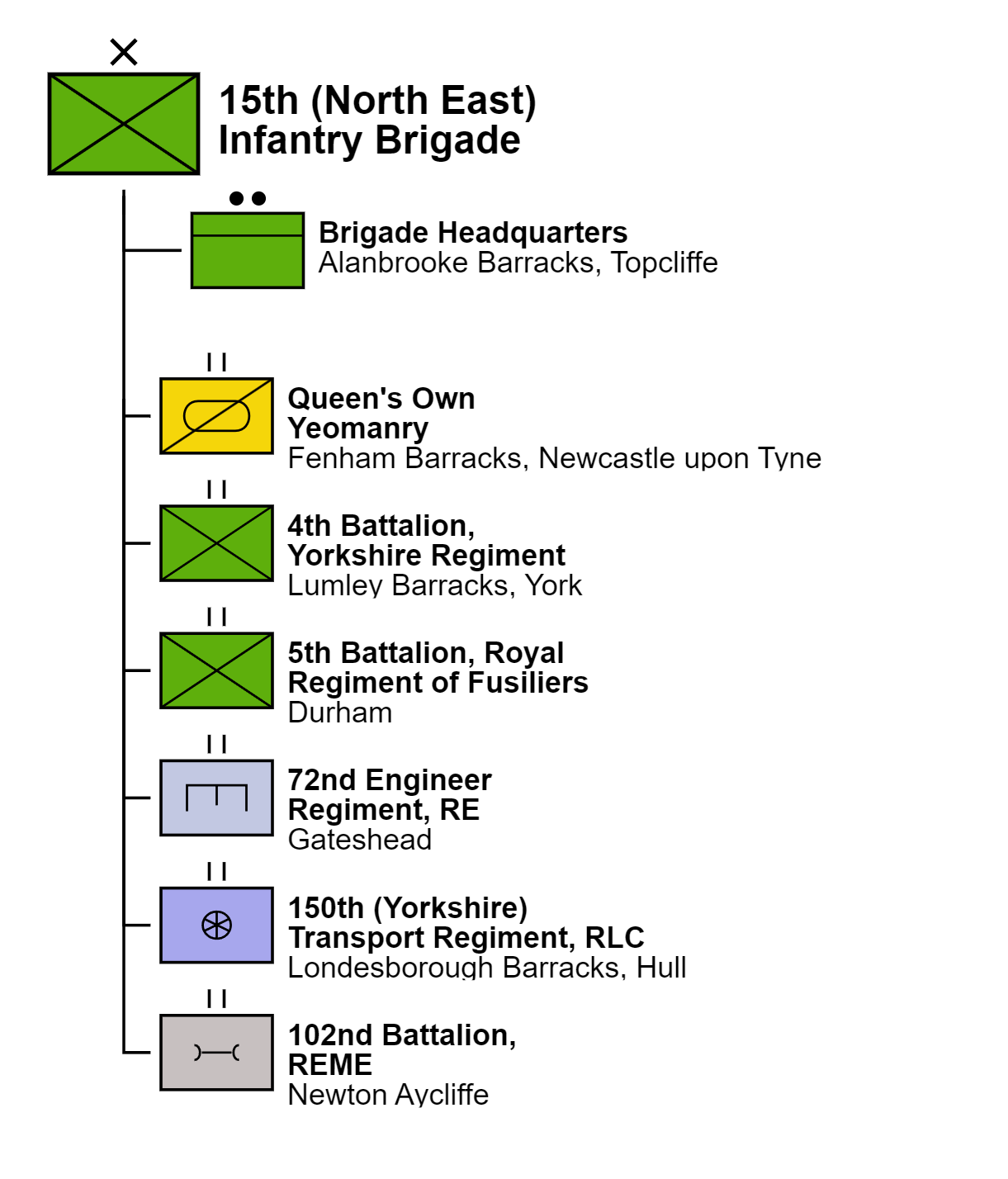
15th (North East) Infantry Brigade (TA)

- Queen's Own Yeomanry (Formation Reconnaissance)
- 4th Battalion, Yorkshire Regiment (14th/15th, 19th & 33rd/76th Foot)
- 5th Battalion, Royal Regiment of Fusiliers
- 72nd Engineer Regiment, Royal Engineers
- 150th (Yorkshire) Transport Regiment, Royal Logistic Corps
- 102nd Battalion, Royal Electrical and Mechanical Engineers

== Commanders ==
The following officers commanded the 15th Brigade during its existence:

- Brigadier-General Richard L. Payne: July 1905-March 1907
- Brigadier-General Jesey J. Dawson: March 1907-April 1908
- Major-General Alexander Wilson: April 1908-August 1911
- Brigadier-General Count Gleichen: August 1911-March 1915
- Brigadier-General Edward Northey: March-June 1915
- Brigadier-General Martin N. Turner: June 1915-November 1917
- Brigadier-General Richard D. F. Oldman: November 1917-1919
- Brigadier-General George T. C. Carter-Campbell: November 1919-July 1921
- Colonel-Commandant Herbert C. Potter: July 1921-December 1922
- Colonel-Commandant Sir Percy C. B. Skinner: December 1922-1923
- Colonel-Commandant Bertram N. Sergison-Brooke: April-December 1927
- Brigadier Charles E. Heathcote: December 1929-April 1932
- Brigadier George C. Kelly: April 1932-October 1934
- Brigadier Archibald B. Beauman: October 1934-October 1938
- Brigadier Henry B. D. Willcox: October 1938-January 1939
- Brigadier Horatio P. M. Berney-Ficklin: July 1939-22 April 1940
- Brigadier H. E. F. Smyth: 22–25 April 1940
- Lieutenant-Colonel A. L. Kent-Lemon: 25 April – 25 May 1940 (acting)
- Brigadier H. P. M. Berney-Ficklin: 25 May – 20 June 1940
- Lieutenant-Colonel A. E. Robinson: 20–22 June 1940 (acting)
- Brigadier J. A. H. Gammell: 22 June – 23 July 1940
- Brigadier Hector R. N. Greenfield: 25 July 1940 – 8 March 1943
- Brigadier George S. Rawstorne: 8 March – 19 August 1943
- Brigadier E. Owen Martin: 19 August 1943 – 22 January 1944
- Brigadier John Y. Whitfield: 22 January – 29 April 1944
- Lieutenant-Colonel P. St Clair-Ford: 29 April – 6 May 1944 (acting)
- Brigadier J. Y. Whitfield: 6 May – 2 July 1944
- Lieutenant Colonel P. St Clair-Ford: 2–13 July 1944 (acting)
- Brigadier Christopher Huxley: 13 July 1944 – 21 June 1945
- Brigadier David Russell Morgan: 21 June 1945 – October 1946
- Brigadier James F. S. McLaren: October 1946-June 1947
- Brigadier Richard W. Goodbody: June 1947-January 1948
- Brigadier Michael A. Aris: January 1982-November 1984
- Brigadier Peter S. Morton: November 1984-April 1987
- Brigadier Timothy D. V. Bevan: April 1987-January 1990
- Brigadier Anthony de C. L. Leask: January 1990-December 1991
- Brigadier Christopher J. Marchant-Smith: December 1991-December 1994
- Brigadier J.Austin Thorp: December 1994-July 1997
- Brigadier Alan P. Deed: July 1997-June 2000
- Brigadier Andrew P. Farquhar: June 2000-September 2002
- Brigadier David A. H. Shaw: September 2002-August 2004
- Brigadier Richard W. Dennis: August 2004-January 2008
- Brigadier David J. H. Maddan: January 2008-December 2010
- Brigadier Greville K. Bibby CBE: January 2011-December 2014
