= Prince of Wales's Own Regiment of Yorkshire =

Former regiment of the British Army

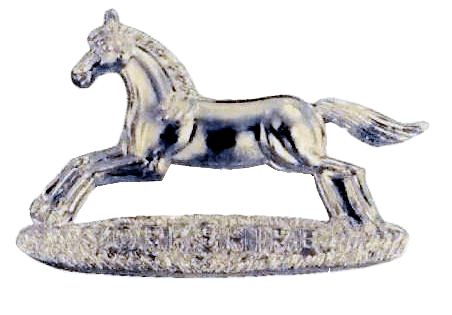
- Cap badge of the Prince of Wales's Own Regiment of Yorkshire
- Active: 1958–2006
- Country: United Kingdom
- Branch: British Army
- Type: Line infantry
- Size: One regular battalion, at largest 4 territorial battalions
- Part of: King's Division
- Garrison/HQ: Imphal Barracks, York
- Nickname: 'The Yorkies'
- Motto: 'Nec aspera terrent' (Latin) - Or rough scare
- March: Quick - Ca Ira and Yorkshire Lass
- Mascots: Imphal and Quebec – Ferrets
- Anniversaries: Imphal–22 June; Quebec–13 September
- Battle honours: Battle honours taken from the former regiments, along with

Insignia
- Tactical Recognition Flash

The Prince of Wales's Own Regiment of Yorkshire was an infantry regiment of the British Army, part of the King's Division. It was created in 1958 by the amalgamation of the West Yorkshire Regiment (Prince of Wales's Own) (14th Foot) and the East Yorkshire Regiment (Duke of York's Own) (15th Foot). After 48 years service, the regiment was amalgamated again, this time with two other Yorkshire regiments. It became the 1st Battalion the Yorkshire Regiment (14th/15th, 19th and 33rd/76th Foot), with the Green Howards (19th Foot) forming the 2nd Battalion and the Duke of Wellington's Regiment (33rd/76th Foot) forming the 3rd Battalion on 6 June 2006. Following further merges, in 2012, the battalion was redesignated as the new 2nd Battalion (2 YORKS) .

== Formation and name ==
The Prince of Wales's Own Regiment of Yorkshire was formed on 25 April 1958 by the amalgamation of The West Yorkshire Regiment (The Prince of Wales's Own) (14th Foot) and The East Yorkshire Regiment (The Duke of York's Own) (15th Foot).

== History ==
The first overseas posting for the regiment was from September 1958 to June 1959 in the Colony of Aden (present day, part of Yemen), followed by a posting to Gibraltar from June 1959 to June 1961. While at Gibraltar a detachment was sent to Libya between October 1960 and November 1960. The battalion served in Wuppertal, West Germany from 1961 to 1964, Berlin 1964-1965, then again in Aden from September 1965 until September 1966. The regiment returned to England in 1966 and was based in Colchester.

In 1967, operational elements were deployed to Cornwall to help with the environmental clean-up after the Torrey Canyon oil spill. An emergency deployment back to Aden in June following the mutinies by the South Arabian Federation Army and Yemen Federal Police. Aden saw the deaths in action of two soldiers from the regiment, Pte F langrick and Sgt WS Saville, as well as the awards of one Military Cross, one Military Medal, and a Mention In Despatches. The battalion returned to Colchester in late 1967.

In April 1969, the battalion was deployed to Northern Ireland, as part of the UK Government's response to terrorist attacks on the Government infrastructure in the province. The regiment's presence and constant patrolling of vital points initially stabilised the situation in their operational area of County Down. On 12 July, sectarian violence led to a rapid redeployment to Derry. Decisive action by the Royal Ulster Constabulary again calmed the situation down and the battalion moved into a fixed tactical base at Magilligan's Point, north of Limavady on the shores of Lough Foyle. On 12 August, the violence erupted in a concerted campaign, which, after nearly three days of street battles, saw the Royal Ulster Constabulary (RUC) totally exhausted. On 14 August 1969, the regiment took over responsibility for the security of Derry.

From February 1970 to October 1972, the battalion was based in Cyprus, then returned to the UK, for another tour in Northern Ireland, until November 1973. From November 1973 until May 1974, the regiment was stationed in Dover, Kent. From 1974 to 1978, the regiment was stationed in Celle (formerly in West Germany), as part of the 7th Armoured Brigade.

The battalion completed another four month emergency tour in Derry during 1975. During this tour, 18-year-old Pte David Wray was shot and killed by a sniper whilst on a foot patrol in the Creggan housing estate. From 1978 to 1983, the regiment served as part of the Allied Mobile Force.

In May 1983, the battalion started a two-year tour as part of the Berlin Brigade, where in 1984 it was presented with new regimental Colours. In April 1985, the battalion redeployed to Abercorn Barracks, Ballykinler, Northern Ireland and was heavily committed in domestic duties, maintaining law and order, particularly in the terrorist plagued countryside of South Armagh.

In May 1987, the battalion moved to Catterick, North Yorkshire, to join 24 Infantry Brigade. Equipped with Saxon armoured personnel carriers, this was the battalion's first tour in Yorkshire since their antecedent regiments amalgamation. In 1988, the battalion re-roled as an airmobile unit in line with 24 Infantry Brigade's conversion to 24 Airmobile Brigade.

In August 1990, the battalion moved to Osnabrück in West Germany to take up a Mechanised Infantry role as part of 12 Armoured Brigade. During the First Gulf War, or Operation Granby (later known as Desert storm), the battalion deployed formed units that included a Milan Section and a Mortar section to the 1st battalion of the Staffordshire Regiment, many men deployed on an individual basis reinforcing units. Some 149 personnel of all ranks were deployed to the gulf.

During Winter 1991, the battalion was once again in Northern Ireland, as the west Belfast roulement battalion.

As a result of the 1992 Strategic Defence Review, the then government of John Major decided to bring Territorial Army (TA) and Regular Army units closer together; as a result, the 2nd Battalion The Yorkshire Volunteers became 3rd Battalion The Prince of Wales's Own Regiment of Yorkshire (Yorkshire Volunteers). The 3rd Battalion was based at York. 3PWO lasted until 1998.

In 1993, the regiment deployed to Bosnia-Herzegovina as part of UNPFOR, with companies in Gornji Vakuf and Vitez. They picked up the unofficial nickname of "ShootBat" due to the 'robustness' of the battalion's actions.

In 1994, the battalion moved to the British Army Training Unit Suffield, Canada followed by a move to Warminster as the Infantry Demonstration Battalion at the Land Warfare Centre. 1997 saw the battalion stationed in Chester with deployments to Ulster, Sierra Leone (Operation Basilica) support to Ministry of Agriculture, Fisheries and Food during the foot and mouth outbreak. Training exercises took troops to Kenya, Jamaica, Italy and Oman. By 2001-2003, 1PWO was in Omagh followed by a move to Catterick Garrison as an Air Assault Battalion, with deployments to Bosnia, as part of SFOR and a training exercise to Belize in 2005.

The regiment amalgamated with its sister battalions of The Green Howards and The Duke of Wellington's Regiment to form The Yorkshire Regiment on 6 June 2006.

== Battalions ==
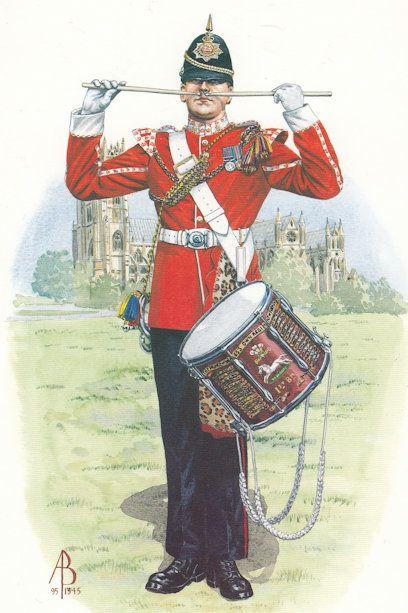
Drummer of the 1st Btn, POWRY, the Horse and Prince of Wales's Feathers are clearly visible, along with the '1st Bn' tag.

The battalions of which the regiment controlled included:

- Band of the Prince of Wales's Own Regiment of Yorkshire (1958–1994), became part of The Waterloo Band of the King's Division in 1994
- Regulars
  - 1st Battalion (1958–2006), former The Prince of Wales's Own West Yorkshire Regiment, became 1st Btn, The Yorkshire Regiment
- Volunteers, (TA 1958–1967 then 1975–2006)
  - 3rd Battalion (1960–1967), reduced to HQ Co and A Co of the Yorkshire Volunteers and The Prince of Wales's Own Yorkshire Territorials
  - Leeds Rifles (1961–1967), reduced to A Company in Yorkshire Volunteers and The Leeds Rifles Territorials
  - 1st Battalion, Yorkshire Volunteers (1967–1993), became 3rd (Yorkshire Volunteers) Btn
  - 3rd (Yorkshire Volunteers) Battalion (1993–1999), became Quebec and Imphal Companies in the East and West Riding Regiment
  - The East and West Riding Regiment (1999–2006), became 4th (Volunteer) Battalion, The Yorkshire Regiment
  - TA of the Prince of Wales's Own West Yorkshire Regiment
    - 5th Battalion (1958–1960) became B, C, and D Companies in 3rd Btn
    - 7th (Leeds Rifles) Battalion (1958–1961), became independent in 1961
  - TA of The Duke of York's Own East Yorkshire Regiment
    - 4th Battalion (1958–1960), became A Company in 3rd Btn
- Territorials, (TA 1967–1975)
  - The Prince of Wales's Own Yorkshire Territorials (1967–1971, became HQ and A Cos in 1st Btn, Yorkshire Volunteers and B Co in 2nd Btn, Yorkshire Volunteers

== Regimental museum ==
The York Army Museum (for the Royal Dragoon Guards, Prince of Wales's Own Regiment of Yorkshire and the Yorkshire Regiment) is based at the Tower Street drill hall in York.

== Colonels-in-Chief ==
- 1958–1965: General HRH Mary, Princess Royal CI GCVO GBE GCStJ RRC TD
- 1985–2006: Major General HRH Katharine, Duchess of Kent GCVO

== Regimental Colonels ==
Colonels of the regiment were:

- 1958–1960: Brig. Robert John Springhall, CB, OBE
- 1960–1970: Brig. Gerald Hilary Cree, CBE, DSO
- 1970–1979: Brig. William Stanley Gibson Armour, MBE
- 1979–1986: Brig. Henry Michael Tillotson, CBE
- 1986–1996: Maj-Gen. Anthony Bernard Crowfoot, CBE
- 1996–2001: Maj-Gen. Edward Horace Alexander Beckett, CB, MBE
- 2001–2006: Maj-Gen. Alastair David Arton Duncan, DSO, OBE
- 2006: Regiment merged with the Green Howards and the Duke of Wellington's Regiment to form the Yorkshire Regiment

== Commanding Officers ==
Commanding Officers have included:

- 1958–1960: Lieutenant Colonel Boris R. D. Garside
- 1960–1962: Lt Col William S. G. Armour
- 1962–1965: Lt Col Peter E. Taylor
- 1965–1967: Lt Col T. Roy Birkett
- 1967–1969: Lt Col William A. E. Todd
- 1969–1971: Lt Col Henry M. Tillotson
- 1971–1973: Lt Col David W. Hanson
- 1973–1976: Lt Col Anthony Bernard Crowfoot
- 1976–1978: Lt Col Edwin Horace Alexander Beckett
- 1978–1981: Lt Col Frederick John Filor
- 1981–1983: Lt Col Peter E. Woolley
- 1983–1986: Lt Col Rory H. J. Forsyth
- 1986–1988: Lt Col Duncan A. H. Green
- 1988–1990: Lt Col John C. L. King
- 1990–1993: Lt Col Alastair David Arton Duncan
- 1993–1997: Lt Col Charles G. Le Brun
- 1997–1999: Lt Col Graham John Binns
- 1999–2001: Lt Col David A. Hill
- 2001–2004: Lt Col Stephen Padgett
- 2004–2006: Lt Col Peter S. Germain

== Alliances & Affiliations ==
Alliances the regiment maintained were:

- Canada–Les Voltigeurs de Québec (1958–2006)
- Canada–1st (Carleton and York) Battalion, The Royal New Brunswick Regiment (1958–2006)
- Canada–The Royal Montreal Regiment (1958–2006)
- New Zealand–The Waikato Regiment, Royal New Zealand Armoured Corps (1958–19xx)
- Falkland Islands–The Falkland Islands Defence Force (1958–2006)

The regiment also maintained a number of cadet affiliations:

- Yorkshire(North and West) Army Cadet Forces, affiliations with the detachments in: Acomb, Castleford, Harrogate, Knaresborough, Lumley, Selby, and Woodlesford
- Humberside and Yorkshire Army Cadet Forces, affiliation with the detachments in: Londesborough, Sutton, Bransholme, Beverley Town, Beverly Grammar School, Bridlington, Cottingham, Pocklington, and Goole.

The Prince of Wales's Own Regiment of Yorkshire Association

== Bibliography ==
- Tillotson, HM (1995). With the Prince of Wales' Own. Michael Russell Publishing. ISBN 978-0-85955-218-9.
