= Royal Yorkshire Regiment =

Infantry regiment of the British Army

Royal Yorkshire Regiment (14th/15th, 19th and 33rd/76th Foot)
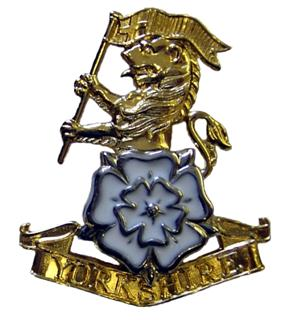
- Cap badge of the regiment
- Active: 6 June 2006 – present
- Branch: British Army
- Type: Line Infantry
- Role: 1st Battalion – Light Mechanised Infantry; 2nd Battalion – Light Role; 4th Battalion – Army Reserve – Light Infantry
- Size: Three battalions
- Part of: Union Division
- Garrison/HQ: RHQ – York; 1st Battalion – Catterick Garrison; 2nd Battalion – Warminster; 4th Battalion – York
- Nickname: Yorkshire Warriors
- Motto: Fortune Favours The Brave
- March: Quick – Ça Ira; Slow – The Duke of York
- Mascots: 1st Battalion –Indian Elephant; 2nd Battalion – Ferrets (Imphal & Quebec)
- Anniversaries: Regimental Day; D-Day 6 June; Battalion Days; Waterloo Day 18 June; Imphal Day 22 June; Yorkshire Day 1 August; Quebec Day 13 September; Alma Day 20 September
- Engagements: Iraq War; Operation Telic; War in Afghanistan; Operation Herrick

Commanders
- Colonel of the Regiment: Lieutenant General Zachary Stenning
- Abbreviation: R YORKS

The Royal Yorkshire Regiment (14th/15th, 19th and 33rd/76th Foot) (abbreviated R YORKS) is an infantry regiment of the British Army, created by the amalgamation of three historic regiments in 2006. It lost one battalion as part of the Army 2020 defence review. The regiment's recruitment area covers the ceremonial counties of the East Riding of Yorkshire, North Yorkshire, South Yorkshire and West Yorkshire; areas near Barnsley are recruitment area for the Rifles.

== Formation ==
The regiment's formation was announced on 16 December 2004 by Geoff Hoon and General Sir Mike Jackson as part of the restructuring of the infantry. It was formed from the merger of three regular battalions, plus a reserve battalion:

- 1st Battalion, Yorkshire Regiment (Prince of Wales's Own) (previously: 1st Battalion, Prince of Wales's Own Regiment of Yorkshire)
- 2nd Battalion, Yorkshire Regiment (Green Howards) (previously: 1st Battalion, Green Howards)
- 3rd Battalion, Yorkshire Regiment (Duke of Wellington's) (previously: 1st Battalion, The Duke of Wellington's Regiment (West Riding)
- 4th Battalion, Yorkshire Regiment (previously: Prince of Wales's Own company of The East and West Riding Regiment, Green Howards company from the Tyne-Tees Regiment and two companies of The Duke of Wellington's Regiment from The East and West Riding Regiment), all formerly titled and known as The Yorkshire Volunteers.

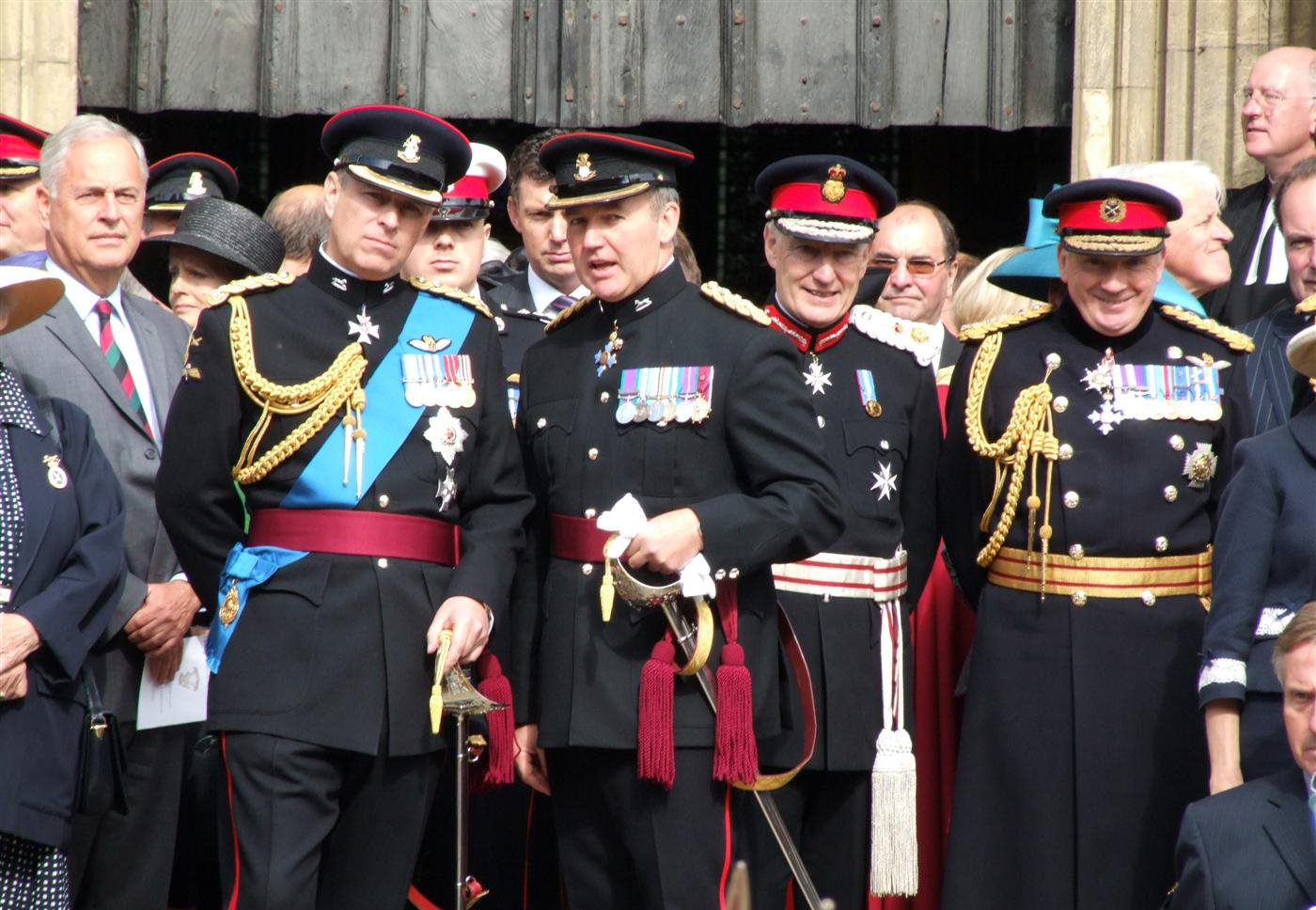
(Left to right) The Duke of York; Gen Sir Nick Houghton; Lord Crathorne, Lord Lieutenant Of North Yorkshire; General Sir Richard Dannatt

The regiment was officially formed on 6 June 2006. The reserve "Territorial Army" (as it was then known) battalion re-badged in TA Centres on the same day, but later paraded publicly to re-badge on 10 June 2006 in the Museum Gardens, York. That same afternoon, representatives of the affiliated Army Cadet Forces and Combined Cadet Forces detachments (approx 50) re-badged in Imphal Barracks, York.

The Duke of York was appointed as Colonel-in-Chief and the 8th Duke of Wellington as Deputy Colonel-in-Chief, by Queen Elizabeth II.

The four battalions of the regiment were presented with new Queens and Regimental Colours at a parade in Imphal Barracks, York, to replace the antecedent regiments' former colours, on 18 June 2010. The 'honorary' set of colours carried by the 3rd Battalion (Duke of Wellington's) was paraded by the battalion. The new colours of all four battalions were later paraded through the streets of York from Cliffords Tower to York Minster.

As part of the Army 2020 reorganisation, in July 2012 an announcement was made that the Yorkshire Regiment would be reduced to two regular battalions, with the 2nd Battalion (Green Howards) disbanded and its soldiers dispersed to the remainder of the regiment on completion of their Cyprus tour in the autumn of 2013.

However, on 25 January 2013 the Colonel of the Regiment, Major General Graham Binns, announced instead a change in the order of battle: the 2nd Battalion was merged into the 1st and 3rd Battalions; the 1st Battalion was then renumbered as the 2nd Battalion and the 3rd Battalion was renumbered as the 1st Battalion. He also announced that they would dispense with the antecedent regiments' historical titles.

On 13 January 2022, the Duke of York returned his military affiliation with the regiment to the Queen.

On 6 April 2023, The Yorkshire Regiment was granted Royal status with immediate effect by King Charles III, changing the regiment's name to the "Royal Yorkshire Regiment".

== History ==
=== Iraq 2006–2007 ===
The deployment of 1 YORKS (Prince of Wales's Own) Battle Group to Basra, Iraq in November 2006 was the first major operational deployment for the Yorkshire Regiment. A Company, under command of Major Richard Hall were based initially in Basra Palace with responsibility from Abu Al Kasib to the whole Al-Faw Peninsula, before moving to Shaibah Logistics Base and being charged with handing over security responsibilities of the base to the Iraqi Army. B Company, under command of Major Dan Bradbury, were based in Shiaba Logistics Base and had responsibility for Az Zubayr, whilst C Company were detached to 2nd Battalion, Duke of Lancaster's Regiment in the COB. During Op Telic 9 Private Luke Simpson of A Company, from Howden, East Riding of Yorkshire, was killed, becoming the regiment's first operational fatality. Two members of the 1st Battalion, Major Ian Crowley of C Company, of Beverley, East Riding of Yorkshire and Captain Ibrar Ali of A Company, were awarded the Military Cross.

=== Afghanistan 2007–2008 ===
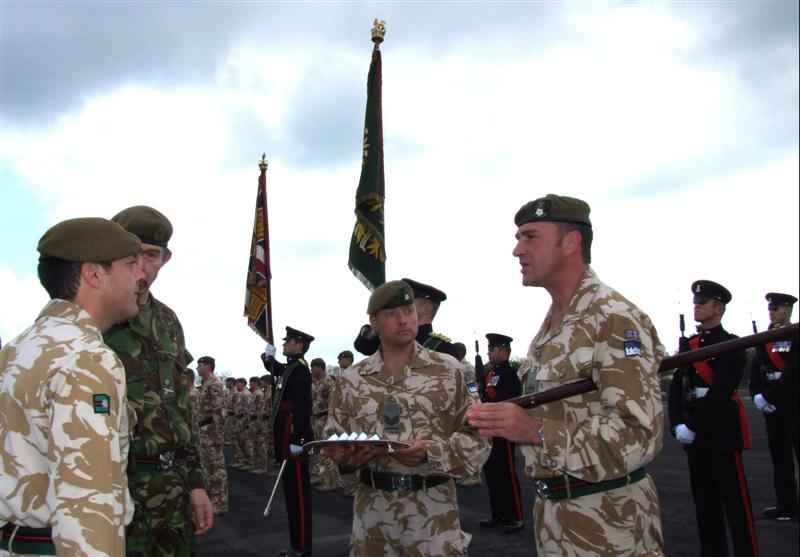
2nd Battalion (Green Howards) Medal Parade

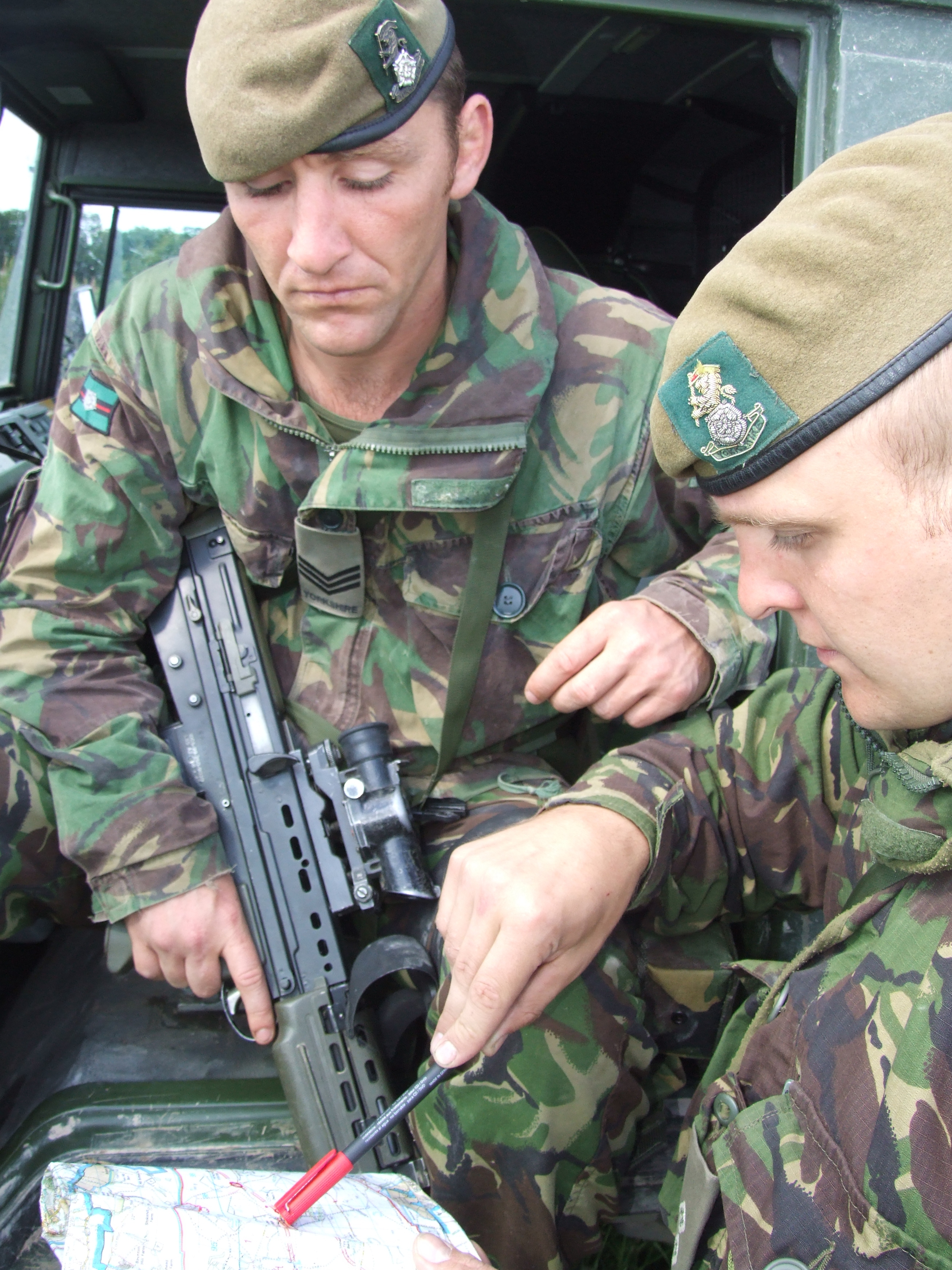
Sergeant Lee Johnson, late of the 2nd Battalion (Green Howards)

The 2nd Battalion (Green Howards) of the regiment were deployed to the Helmand Province of Afghanistan in September, 2007 in an 'Operational Mentoring and Liaison' role with the Afghan National Army. Whilst there they took part in the Battle of Musa Qala during which Sgt Lee Johnson was killed shortly after 10am on 8 December 2007, in the lead up to the operation to retake the town from the Taliban forces, after his Vector armoured vehicle ran over a landmine. Sgt Johnson had previously received a MID for assisting his company commander, Major Jake Little, in extracting soldiers who were surrounded by Taliban fighters. Major Little was later awarded a Military Cross for his "inspirational leadership" to extract his men. Acting Sergeant John Cockburn was also awarded a Military Cross for his actions in the same tour of duty.

The 2nd Battalion (Green Howards) returned to their barracks in Weeton, Lancashire during April, 2008 and were presented with their service medals at a parade there on 30 April 2008 by Major General Andrew Farquhar, Honorary Colonel of the Battalion, along with Brigadier Andrew Mackay, of 52 Infantry Brigade, and Brigadier Mike Griffiths, of 42 (North West) Brigade.

=== Kosovo 2008–2009 ===
B Company Group of 1st Battalion (Prince of Wales Own) deployed for six-months on Op OCULUS(K) as the last UK Intelligence, Surveillance & Reconnaissance Task Force (ISR TF). They presided over the immediate aftermath of the Kosovo's declaration of independence.

=== Iraq 2008–2009 ===
In November 2008, elements of the 1st Battalion (Prince of Wales's Own) redeployed to Iraq on Op Telic 13. In May 2009, 'A Company' of the 1st Battalion (Prince of Wales Own) handed over their Iraq British military HQ protection duties, in Baghdad, to Alma Company of the 3rd Battalion (Duke of Wellington's). Alma Company were subsequently amongst the last British soldiers to leave Iraq at the end of July 2009.

=== Afghanistan 2009–2010 ===
Over 130 members of the 3rd Battalion (Duke of Wellington's) deployed in July 2009 as Battle Casualty Replacements to various other British regiments in Helmand Province. Burma Company of the 3rd Battalion (Duke of Wellington's) deployed to Afghanistan in August 2009 and were then followed by members of Corunna Company. 18-year-old Pte Jonathon Young, of Burma Company, was killed by an Improvised explosive device in Sangin, on Thursday 20 August, three weeks after arriving in Afghanistan. A serjeant, from the 2nd Battalion The Rifles, 29-year-old Serjeant Paul McAleese, was killed when he went to the assistance of Pte Young.

On 1 February 2010, 22-year-old Corporal Liam Riley, of Sheffield, and 27-year-old Lance Corporal Graham Shaw, of Golcar in Huddersfield were killed by separate IED's, Malgir, near Gereshk in Helmand Province, whilst on base security foot patrols. Both soldiers, from Corunna Company of the 3rd Battalion (Duke of Wellington's), were attached to the 1st Battalion Coldstream Guards, as Battle Casualty Replacements. Prince Harry had trained with Cpl Riley at Suffield in Canada and paid tribute to him in a news release.

The 2nd Battalion (Green Howards), plus 60 members of the 4th Battalion, deployed with 11th Light Brigade in September 2009 for a seven-month posting in Op Herrick XI as the OMLT Battle Group. Their actions featured in a series of Newsnight programmes shown both during the deployment and after their return, which focused on OMLT 2 in Sangin under Major Rob Palfrey. Two members of the Battalion were awarded the Military Cross, Lieutenant Colin Lunn of Doncaster, and Acting Corporal Andrew Wardle of Hetton-le-Hole in Sunderland. In addition, Sergeant John Swithenbank and Corporal John Hardman received the Queen's Gallantry Medal.

On 23 June 2010, 26-year-old Lance Corporal David Ramsden of Otley, who was serving with the 1st Battalion The Mercian Regiment, was killed. The NCO from 1st Battalion (Prince of Wales Own) was serving as part of the Police Advisory Team which was tasked to respond to an incident at a checkpoint near Gereshk in Helmand Province, when the Ridgeback armoured vehicle he was travelling in rolled into a waterway. He was killed alongside colleagues Colour Sergeant Martyn Simon Horton, Private Douglas Niall Halliday and Private Alex Isaac.

=== Afghanistan 2011–2012 ===
In October 2011, 500 members of the 1st Battalion (Prince of Wales Own) were deployed to Helmand province in Afghanistan for a six-month tour in support of the 20th Armoured Brigade, their first deployment to Afghanistan as a complete battalion. The battalion was split up for the deployment, with A Company working with 3rd Battalion The Royal Regiment of Scotland, B and C Companies with the Danish Army, and the Brigade Headquarters providing staff for Headquarters Task Force Helmand. 1 YORKS soldiers formed the Brigade Reconnaissance Force with members of 1st The Queen's Dragoon Guards. Soldiers from 1st Battalion were reported to have been involved in 'high tempo' patrol operations alongside the Afghanistan police force. B Company serving as part of the Danish Battle Group in the Nahr-e Saraj (North) area of operations, patrolled aggressively into several contested areas. On 1 December 2011 the Battalion was involved in a dawn raid on a suspected IED factory. On 1 January 2012 Private John King was killed in an explosion while on a foot patrol in Nahr-e Saraj, on 27 January Lance Corporal Gajbahadur Gurung of the Royal Gurkha Rifles was killed while serving with 1 YORKS in the Nahr-e Saraj district.

On 6 March 2012, six members of Corunna company, 3rd Battalion (Duke of Wellington's) were killed in the Lashkar Gah Durai region after their Warrior Armoured vehicle was struck by an improvised explosive device.

On 29 April 2012, the 3 YORKS Battle Group took over responsibility of Nahr-e Saraj (South), Helmand province from the 5th Battalion, the Rifles. On the 3 June 2012 Private Gregg Thomas Stone of Burma Company, 3 YORKS was killed in Nahr-e Saraj during an operation to apprehend a group of insurgents who had abducted a member of the Afghan Police. On 15 September 2012, Sergeant Gareth Thursby and Private Thomas Wroe of the 3rd Battalion were killed in Nahr-e Saraj by a rogue Afghan police officer.

=== Kenya 2013 ===
In February 2013, 16 soldiers serving with the reconnaissance platoon of 1st Battalion (Prince of Wales Own), staged a mutiny whilst on a training exercise in Kenya. Led by Corporal Anthony Brown, they staged a sit down strike in front of 1,000 people. Each soldier refused to stand up when individually commanded to do so. As they went through their drills, a ringleader shouted 'sit down' and the dissenters dropped to ground. Commanders ordered each man in turn to stand up but were ignored. The soldiers had clashed with their newly appointed commanding officers whom they accused of excessive drinking, complaining they were "being led by muppets". At courts martial, in December 2013, the soldiers pleaded guilty to disobeying a lawful command. Cpl Brown was sentenced to 60 days imprisonment and a dishonourable discharge. The prosecutor, Col. Clive Whitwham, said: 'There was a feeling they were not being appreciated, that they were not being well managed. 'The platoon was said to have worked well in Afghanistan. There was said to have been a perception that they had got a little too big for their boots.' The soldiers defence Jonathan Lynch, said: 'This is not a case of inflated egos but a case of mismanagement.' Two lance corporals were reduced to the rank of private, with 60 days imprisonment and the Private soldiers were each given 40 days imprisonment.

=== Regimental Battalion changes, July 2013 ===
The 3rd Battalion (Duke of Wellington's) laid up its Regulation Colours on 20 July 2013, at Halifax Minster, following a series of 'Freedom Parades' during the preceding week. On 25 July there was a parade at the 3rd Battalion barracks, in Warminster, the Colonel in Chief, the Duke of York, exchanged the Colours between the Battalions.

=== Iraq 2014 ===
In October 2014 the UK Ministry of Defence confirmed that a team of about a dozen soldiers from the Yorkshire Regiment's 2nd Battalion were training Kurdish Peshmerga forces in northern Iraq fighting Islamic State militants to use UK-supplied heavy machine guns.

=== Experimental unit ===
Following the Army 2020 Refine, 2 YORKS was converted to an 'Enhanced Light Force Battalion', part of a 120 million pound three-year programme. The battalion will help spearhead the British Army's transformation into the 'Future Soldier' programme relating to the Light Infantry. 1 YORKS continues to convert to the Boxer MIV, and then form part of the new 'Experimentation Battlegroup'.

== Current battalion roles ==
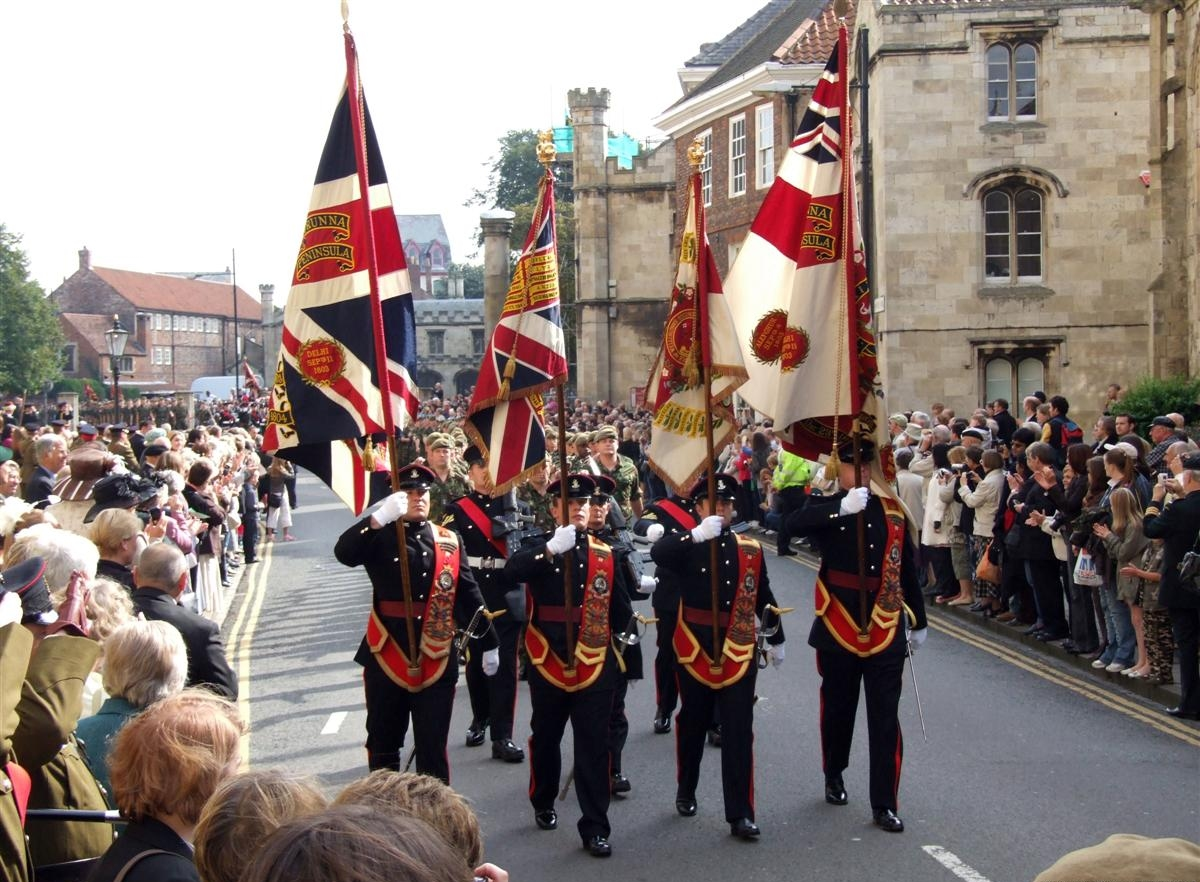
Honorary Colours of the Yorkshire Regiment

=== 1st Battalion ===
The 1st Battalion (abbreviated 1 R YORKS), is based at Catterick Garrison. The battalion is a light mechanised infantry battalion deployed as part of 7th Light Mechanised Brigade.

=== 2nd Battalion ===
The 2nd Battalion (2 R YORKS), is a "near surface operations battalion" based at Dale Barracks in Chester assigned to 11 Brigade.

=== 4th Battalion ===
The 4th Battalion (4 R YORKS), is the Army Reserve battalion of the Royal Yorkshire Regiment. The battalion headquarters is in Worsley Barracks, York and forms part of 4th Infantry Brigade and Headquarters North East. The battalion operates from Army Reserve Centres across the regimental footprint with companies dispersed in Barnsley, Beverley, Huddersfield, Hull, Leeds, Middlesbrough, Sheffield and York.

== Regimental museum ==
The York Army Museum (for the Royal Dragoon Guards, Prince of Wales's Own Regiment of Yorkshire and the Royal Yorkshire Regiment) is based at the Tower Street drill hall in York.

== Yorkshire Regiment beer ==
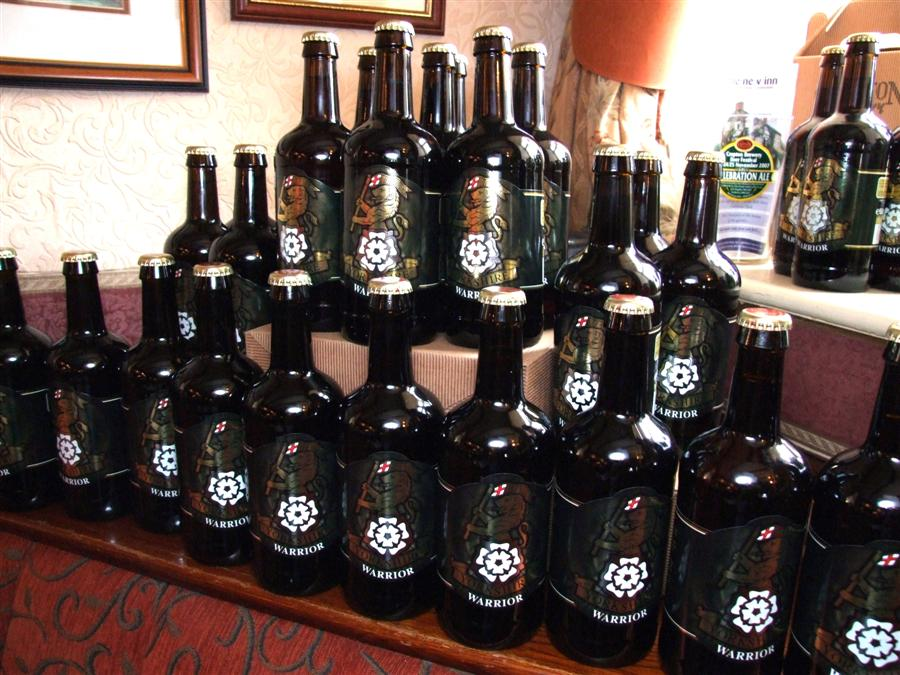
Display of Yorkshire Warrior Beer Bottles, in the New Inn at Cropton, on the launch day.

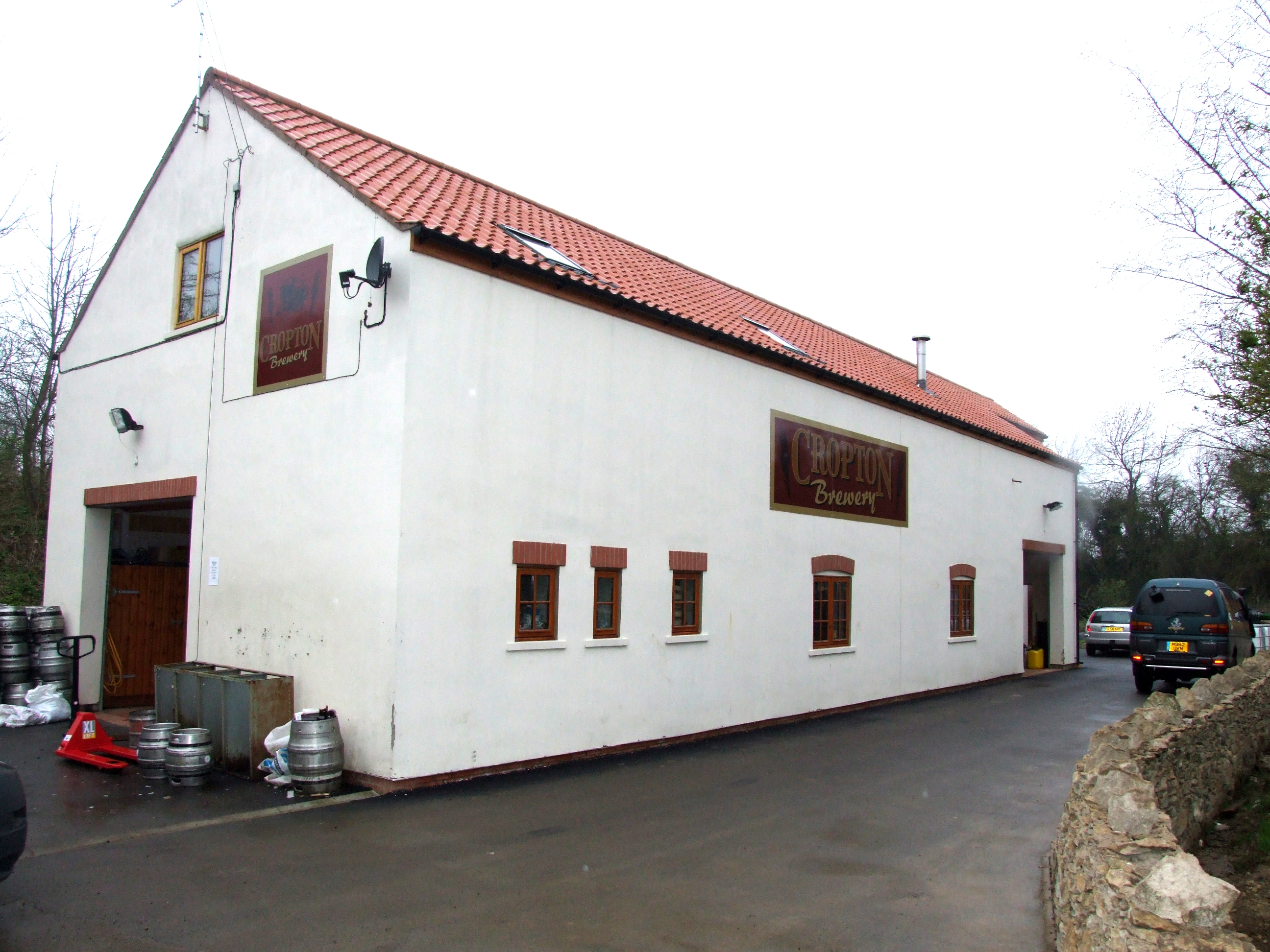
Cropton Brewery

On St George's Day 23 April 2008, Paul and Phil Lee, the owners of the Cropton Brewery & New Inn, released a new beer called Yorkshire Warrior. The beer, which is only available in eight North Yorkshire pubs, was produced to celebrate the proud achievements of the regiment and to commemorate the sacrifices the soldiers and families of the regiment have endured.

== York Medal ==
Each year, the regiment awards the York Medal to the individual who has contributed the most to the aims of the regiment over the course of the previous year, with notable recipients including Captain Tom Moore.

== Freedom awards ==
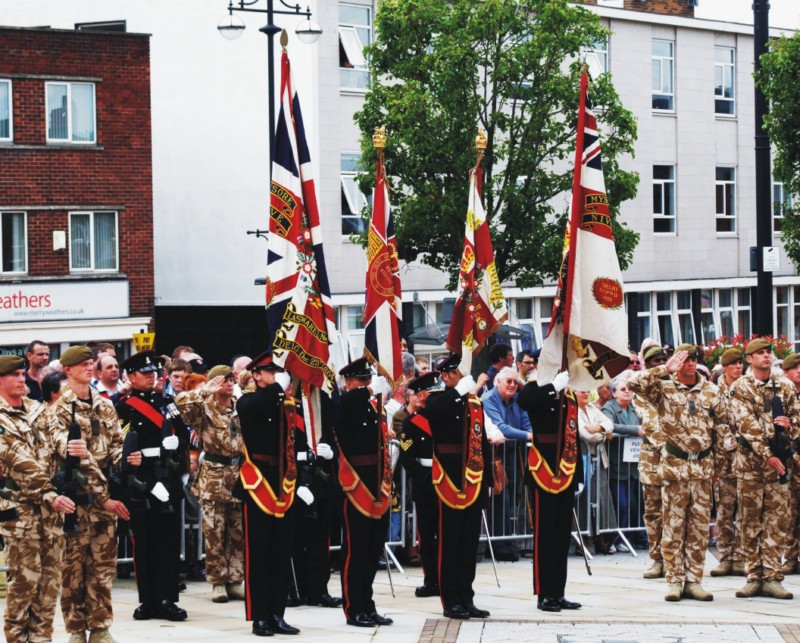
Colours and Guard of the 3rd Bn Yorkshire Regiment (Duke of Wellington's)

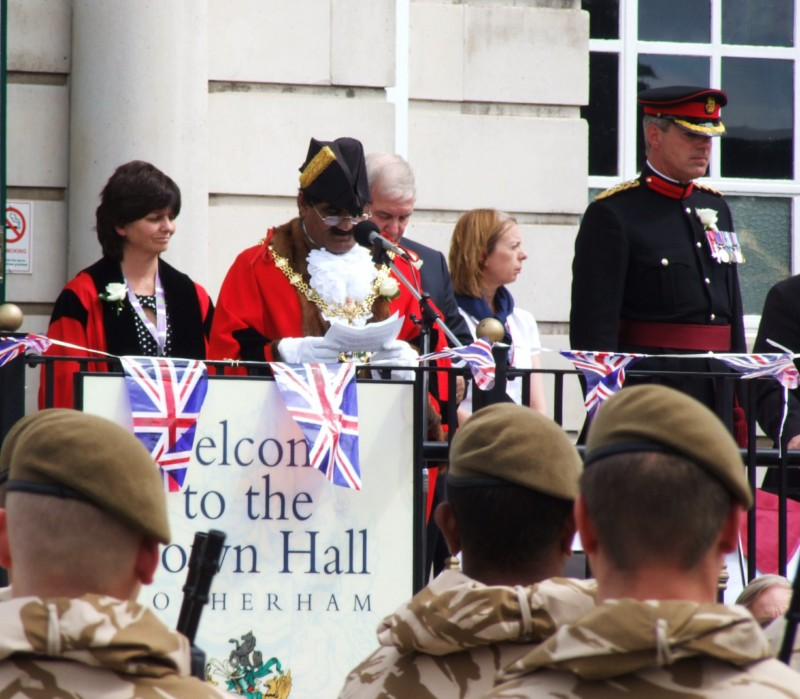
The Mayor of Rotherham, Cllr Shaukat Ali and Col Simon Newton, Royal Yorkshire Regiment

Freedoms awarded to the Royal Yorkshire Regiment (including those carried through from the antecedent regiments) include the following:

- Cities: Bradford, Kingston-upon-Hull, Leeds, Sheffield, York and Wakefield.
- Towns and districts: Barnsley, Beverley (East Riding of Yorkshire), Bridlington (East Riding of Yorkshire), Halifax (Calderdale), Harrogate, Huddersfield (Kirklees), Keighley, Middlesbrough, Redcar and Cleveland, Richmond, Rotherham, Scarborough, Skipton (Craven District), Stockton on Tees and Warminster.

The regiment also holds the distinction of having the freedom of Erquinghem-Lys, France, which was passed on from the freedom awarded to the 3rd Battalion (Duke of Wellington's) in November 2005. The Duke of Wellington's Regiment (West Riding) were also awarded the Freedom of Mossley, on 8 July 1967.

On 3 August 2009, Rotherham, South Yorkshire became the first town to bestow the 'Freedom of the Borough' on the Yorkshire Regiment. This gives the regiment the right to march through the town with 'flags flying, bands playing and bayonets fixed'. At a ceremony outside the Town Hall the regiment paraded two guards of soldiers who had recently returned from Iraq, and the colours of the 3rd Battalion Yorkshire Regiment (Duke of Wellington's), led by the Kings Division Band, under the command of Lieutenant Colonel Vallings, the Battalion commanding officer. The Mayor of Rotherham, Councillor Shaukat Ali, on behalf of the Borough, presented the Freedom Scroll to Colonel Simon Newton, who accepted the honour for the Regiment.

On 8 September 2013 the regiment was given the Freedom of Barnoldswick, Lancashire (the town was until 1974 in the West Riding of Yorkshire) during a rededication ceremony of the town's war memorial, when 46 new names from the two world wars were added.

The regiment was awarded the Freedom of Warminster, Wiltshire on its return from Afghanistan following their homecoming parade on 30 November 2012.

== Battle honours ==
Including those inherited from preceding units:

- Nine Years' War

Namur 1695

- War of the Spanish Succession

Blenheim, Ramillies, Oudenaarde, Malplaquet

- War of the Austrian Succession

Louisburg, Dettingen

- Seven Years' War

Quebec 1759, Martinique 1762, Havannah

- American War of Independence

St Lucia 1778, Martinique 1794 and 1809

- War of the First Coalition

Tournay, Belle Isle

- Second Anglo-Maratha War

Hindoostan, Mysore, Ally Ghur, Delhi 1803, Leswaree, Deig

- Fourth Anglo-Mysore War

Seringapatam

- Napoleonic Wars

Corunna, Nive, Peninsula, Guadaloupe 1810, Waterloo

- Jat War 1825–26

Siege of Bhurtpore 1825–26 (Bharatpur)

- Crimean War

Alma, Inkerman, Sevastopol, Abyssinia

- New Zealand Wars

New Zealand,

- Second Anglo-Afghan War

Tirah, Afghanistan 1879–80

- Second Boer War

Relief of Ladysmith, Relief of Kimberley, Paardeburg, South Africa 1900–02

- First World War

Mons, Le Cateau, Retreat from Mons, Battle of the Marne 1914 and 1918, Aisne 1914 and 1918, Armentières 1914, La Bassée 1914, Ypres 1914, 1915, 1917 and 1918, Langemarck 1914 and 1917, Gheluvelt, Nonne Bosschen, Neuve Chapelle, Hill 60, Gravenstafel, St. Julien, Frezenberg, Bellewaarde, Aubers, Festubert, Hooge 1915, Loos, Somme 1916 and 1918, Albert 1916 and 1918, Bazentin, Delville Wood, Pozières, Flers-Courcelette, Morval, Thiepval, Le Transloy, Ancre Heights, Ancre 1916, Arras 1916, 1917 and 1918, Scarpe 1917 and 1918, Arleux, Oppy, Bullecourt, Hill 70, Messines 1917 and 1918, Pilckem, Menin Road, Polygon Wood, Broodseinde, Poelcappelle, Passchendaele, Cambrai 1917 and 1918, St Quentin, Bapaume 1918, Rosieres, Ancre 1918, Villiers Bretonneux, Lys, Estaires, Hazebrouck, Bailleul, Kemmel, Bethune, Scherpenberg, Marne 1918, Tardenois, Amiens, Drocourt-Quéant, Hindenburg Line, Havrincourt, Epéhy, Canal du Nord, St Quentin Canal, Beaurevoir, Selle, Valenciennes, Sambre, France and Flanders 1914–18, Piave, Vittorio Veneto, Italy 1917–18, Struma, Doiran 1917, Macedonia 1915–18, Suvla, Landing at Suvla, Scimitar Hill, Gallipoli 1915, Egypt 1915–1916, Archangel 1918.

- Third Anglo-Afghan War

Afghanistan 1919

- Second World War

Otta, Norway 1940, Withdrawal to Escaut, Defence of Arras, French Frontier 1940, Ypres-Comines Canal, Dunkirk 1940, St. Valery-en-Caux, Normandy Landing, Tilly sur Seulles, Odon, Fontenay Le Pesnil, Caen, Bourguebus Ridge, Troarn, Mont Pincon, St Pierre La Vielle, Gheel, Nederrijn, Aam, Venraij, Rhineland, Schaddenhof, Brinkum, Bremen, North-West Europe 1940 and 1944–45, Jebel Defeis, Keren, Ad Teclescan, Abyssinia 1940–41, Gazala, Cauldron, Mersa Matruh, Defence of Alamein Line, El Alamein, Mareth, Wadi ZigZaou, Akarit, North Africa 1940–42, 1942–43 and 1943, Banana Ridge, Medjez Plain, Gueriat el Atach Ridge, Tunis, Djebel Bou Aoukaz 1943, North Africa 1943, Primasole Bridge, Landing in Sicily, Lentini, Sicily 1943, Minturno, Anzio, Campoleone, Rome, Monte Ceco, Italy 1943–44 and 43–45, Sittang 1942, Pegu 1942, Paungde, Yenangyaung 1942, North Arakan, Maungdaw, Defence of Sinzweya, Imphal, Bishenpur, Kanglantonbi, Kohima, Meiktila, Capture of Meiktila, Defence of Meiktila, Rangoon Road, Pyawbwe, Arakan beaches, Chindits 1944, Burma Campaign (1942–44).

- Korean War

The Hook 1953, Korean War 1952–53 (Theatre Honour)

- Iraq War

Iraq 2003 (Theatre Honour)

Infantry regiments are permitted to display 43 battle honours from the two world wars on the Queen's Colour and 46 honours from other conflicts on the Regimental Colour. Upon amalgamation, the Yorkshire Regiment had to choose from the total list of honours of its three antecedents which honours would be displayed on its new colours. The chosen honours were:

- Queen's Colour
  - Mons; Marne 1914, 18; Aisne 1914, 18; Armentieres 1914; Ypres 1914, 15, 17, 18; Hill 60; Loos; Somme 1916, 18; Arras 1917, 18; Cambrai 1917, 18; Lys; Tardenois; Selle; Valenciennes; Piave; Vittoria Veneto; Doiran 1917; Suvla; Gallipoli 1915; Norway 1940; Dunkirk; St Valery en Caux; Normandy Landing; Odon; Fontenay le Pesnil; Schaddenhof; NW Europe 1940, 44–45; Keren; Gazala; El Alamein; Mareth; Akarit; Djebel Bou Aoukaz 1943; Sicily 1943; Minturno; Anzio; Monte Ceco; Sittang 1942, 45; Pegu 1942; Defence of Sinweya; Imphal; Meiktila; Burma 1942–45
- Regimental Colour
  - Namur 1695; Blenheim; Ramillies; Oudenarde; Malplaquet; Dettingen; Louisburg; Quebec 1759; Bellisle; Martinique 1762; Havannah; St Lucia 1778; Martinique 1794, 1809; Tournay; Mysore; Seringapatam; Ally Ghur; Delhi 1803; Leswarree; Dieg; Corunna; Guadaloupe 1810; Java; Nive; Peninsula; Waterloo; Bhurtpore; Alma; Inkerman; Sevastopol; New Zealand; Abyssinia; Afghanistan 1879–80; Tirah; Relief of Kimberley; Paardeburg; Relief of Ladysmith; South Africa 1899–1902; Afghanistan 1919; Korea 1952–53; The Hook 1953; Iraq 2003

In addition to the displayed honours, the regimental colours also display four emblems from the antecedents regiments:

- White Horse of Hanover – displayed top right; from the Prince of Wales's Own Regiment of Yorkshire
- Star of Brunswick – displayed bottom left; from Prince of Wales's Own Regiment of Yorkshire
- Dannebrog Cross – displayed bottom right; from the Green Howards
- Elephant & Howdah – displayed bottom centre; from the Duke of Wellington's Regiment

The Battalion's Roman Numeral is in the top left corner of each flag. The use of the Cross of St George as the background is unique to the Yorkshire Regiment.

== Alliances ==
- Canada – The Rocky Mountain Rangers
- Canada – The Queen's York Rangers (1st American Regiment) (RCAC)
- Canada – The Royal Montreal Regiment
- Canada – 1st Battalion, The Royal New Brunswick Regiment (Carleton and York)
- Canada – Les Voltigeurs de Québec
- Pakistan – 10th Battalion, Baloch Regiment
- Falkland Islands – The Falkland Islands Defence Force
- Norway – Hans Majestet Kongens Garde (Bond of Friendship)
- Royal Navy – HMS York (until 2012)
- Royal Navy – HMS Richmond
- Royal Navy – HMS Iron Duke

== Order of precedence ==
Preceded by Royal Anglian Regiment	Infantry Order of Precedence	Succeeded by Mercian Regiment

== Lineage ==
1880	1881 Childers Reforms	1921 Name changes	1957 Defence White Paper	1966 Defence White Paper	1990 Options for Change	2003 Delivering Security in a Changing World
14th (Buckinghamshire) (Prince of Wales's Own) Regiment of Foot	The Prince of Wales's Own (West Yorkshire Regiment)		Prince of Wales's Own Regiment of Yorkshire			Royal Yorkshire Regiment (14th/15th, 19th and 33rd/76th Foot)
15th (York, East Riding) Regiment of Foot	The East Yorkshire Regiment renamed in 1935: The East Yorkshire Regiment (The Duke of York's Own)		Prince of Wales's Own Regiment of Yorkshire			Royal Yorkshire Regiment (14th/15th, 19th and 33rd/76th Foot)
19th (1st York, North Riding) (Princess of Wales's Own) Regiment of Foot	The Princess of Wales's Own (Yorkshire Regiment) renamed in 1902: Alexandra, Princess of Wales's Own (Yorkshire Regiment)	Green Howards (Alexandra, Princess of Wales's Own Yorkshire Regiment)				Royal Yorkshire Regiment (14th/15th, 19th and 33rd/76th Foot)
33rd (Duke of Wellington's) Regiment of Foot	The Duke of Wellington's (West Riding Regiment)	The Duke of Wellington's Regiment (West Riding)				Royal Yorkshire Regiment (14th/15th, 19th and 33rd/76th Foot)
76th Regiment of Foot	The Duke of Wellington's (West Riding Regiment)	The Duke of Wellington's Regiment (West Riding)				Royal Yorkshire Regiment (14th/15th, 19th and 33rd/76th Foot)
