= Yorkshire Volunteers =

- Active: 1 April 1967–25 April 1993
- Allegiance: United Kingdom
- Branch: British Army
- Type: TA Reserve
- Role: Infantry
- Size: Four battalions
- March: On Ilkla Moor Baht 'at

The Yorkshire Volunteers was an infantry regiment of the British Territorial Army. The regiment was raised on 1 April 1967 and disbanded on 25 April 1993.

Following subsequent amalgamations and reorganisations the regiment is represented by the 4th Battalion, The Yorkshire Regiment.

== History ==
The regiment was formed as part of the response to the 1966 Defence Review. This review mandated a reduction in the size of the Territorial Army (TA). As a result, most of the Yorkshire battalions of TA infantry were merged into a single battalion of the new regiment.

The battalions merged into the new regiment were:

- 3rd Battalion, The Prince of Wales's Own Regiment of Yorkshire
- 4th/5th Battalion, The Green Howards
- The West Riding Battalion, The Duke of Wellington's Regiment
- The Hallamshire Battalion, The York and Lancaster Regiment

Regimental headquarters were established at York, with companies based in Sheffield, Middlesbrough, York and Halifax.

In 1969 a fifth company was established in Leeds with the amalgamation into the regiment of The Leeds Rifles, The Prince of Wales's Own Regiment of Yorkshire. Following the formation of the Leeds company, the five parent units were reduced to cadre strength and administered by the new regiment.

Two years later the 2nd and 3rd Battalions were raised by the five infantry cadres and the three Yorkshire based TA Royal Artillery regiments. The Humber Regiment, Royal Artillery became A (Humber Artillery) Company, 2nd Battalion Yorkshire Volunteers; the West Riding Regiment, Royal Artillery became A Battery, 3rd Battalion, Yorkshire Volunteers and the Sheffield Artillery Volunteers became B Battery of the same. Battalion headquarters for the newly formed battalions were at York and Huddersfield respectively.

On 1 January 1988 a 4th battalion was raised but this was short lived and in 1992 the 3rd and 4th Battalions were merged into the 3rd/4th Battalion with battalion headquarters in Sheffield.

The 1990 defence review, Options for Change, decided to reintroduce the relationship between the TA battalions and the regular army regiments. Less than a year after the formation of the 3rd/4th Battalion, the entire regiment was broken up and each battalion became a battalion of the three Yorkshire infantry regiments.

1st Battalion became 4th/5th Battalion Green Howards (Yorkshire Volunteers); 2nd Battalion became 3rd Battalion The Prince of Wales's Own Regiment of Yorkshire (Yorkshire Volunteers); 3rd/4th Battalion became, 3rd Battalion The Duke of Wellington's Regiment (West Riding)(Yorkshire Volunteers). Each battalion retained the name Yorkshire Volunteers in its title.

The disbandment ceremony took place in the presence of the Duchess of Kent, the Honorary Colonel of the Regiment, at Somme Barracks in Catterick on 25 April 1993.
