= Captain Tom Moore =

British Army officer and fundraiser (1920–2021)

Captain Sir Tom Moore
- Moore during the period of his 2020 fundraiser
- Born: Thomas Moore; 30 April 1920; Keighley, West Riding of Yorkshire, England
- Died: 2 February 2021 (aged 100); Bedford, Bedfordshire, England
- Burial place: Morton Cemetery, Riddlesden, Keighley
- Education: Keighley Grammar School
- Spouses: Billie (m. 1949, annulled) Pamela (m. 1968; died 2006)
- Children: 2
- Military career
- Awards: Pride of Britain; York Medal; Knight Bachelor
- Military career
- Allegiance: United Kingdom
- Branch: British Army
- Service years: 1940–1946
- Rank: Captain; Honorary Colonel, Army Foundation College (from 2020)
- Units: Duke of Wellington's Regiment; 145th Regiment Royal Armoured Corps; 146th Regiment Royal Armoured Corps
- Conflicts: Second World War; Burma campaign

Captain Sir Thomas Moore (30 April 1920 – 2 February 2021), more popularly known as Captain Tom, was a British Army officer and fundraiser. He made international headlines in April 2020 when he raised money for charity in the run-up to his 100th birthday during the COVID-19 pandemic. He served in India and the Burma campaign during the Second World War, and later became an instructor in armoured warfare. After the war, he worked as managing director of a concrete company and was an avid motorcycle racer.

On 6 April 2020, at the age of 99 during the first COVID-19 national lockdown, Moore began to walk 100 lengths of his garden in aid of NHS Charities Together, with the goal of raising £1,000 by his 100th birthday on 30 April. In the 24-day course of his fundraising, he made many media appearances and became a household name in the UK, earning a number of accolades and attracting over 1.5 million individual donations.

In recognition of his efforts, he received the BBC Sports Personality of the Year Helen Rollason Award at the 2020 ceremony. He performed in a cover version of the song "You'll Never Walk Alone" sung by Michael Ball, with proceeds going to the same charity. The single topped the UK singles chart, making him the oldest person to achieve a UK number one.

On the morning of Moore's 100th birthday, the total raised by his walk passed £30 million, and by the time the campaign closed at the end of that day, had increased to over £32.79 million (worth almost £39 million with expected tax rebates). His birthday was marked in a number of ways, including flypasts by the Royal Air Force and the British Army. He received over 150,000 cards, and was appointed as honorary colonel of the Army Foundation College. On 17 July 2020, he was personally knighted by Queen Elizabeth II at Windsor Castle. He died on 2 February 2021 aged 100, at Bedford Hospital, where he was taken after being treated for pneumonia, later testing positive for COVID-19.

== Early life and education ==
Moore was born in Keighley, West Riding of Yorkshire, England, on 30 April 1920, and grew up in the town. He was the son of Isabella (née Hird) and Wilson "Wilfred" Moore. His father was from a family of builders, and his mother was a head teacher. Moore was educated at Keighley Grammar School and started an apprenticeship in civil engineering.

Moore raced motorcycles competitively – he acquired his first when he was twelve and wore the number 23. He rode a Scott Flying Squirrel motorcycle, winning several trophies. Moore was a member of the Keighley and District Photographic Association between 1934 and 1936, as his father had also been.

== Military service ==
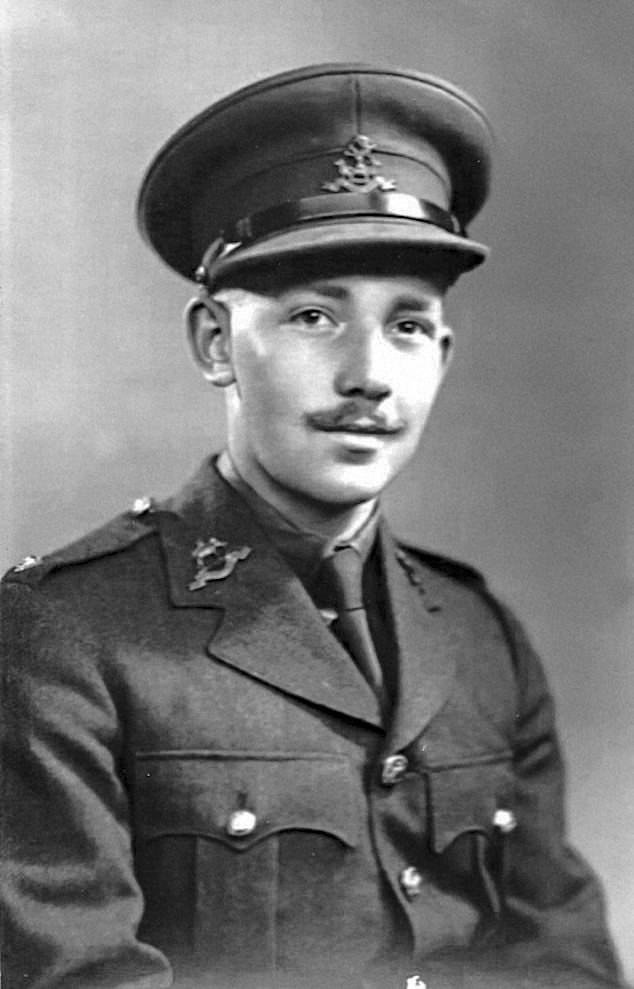
Moore as a second lieutenant in the British Army (c. 1941)

Moore was conscripted in the 8th Battalion, Duke of Wellington's Regiment (8 DWR) in June 1940, stationed at Weston Park in Otley, nine months after the beginning of the Second World War. He was selected for officer training later that year, and attended an Officer Cadet Training Unit before being commissioned as a second lieutenant on 28 June 1941.

On 22 October 1941, Moore became a member of the Royal Armoured Corps. This was because 8 DWR became an armoured unit designated as the 145th Regiment Royal Armoured Corps. Later that year, he was transferred to the 9th Battalion (9 DWR) in India, which had converted to become the 146th Regiment Royal Armoured Corps. While in India, he was tasked with setting up and running a training programme for army motorcyclists. He was initially posted to Bombay (now Mumbai) and subsequently to Calcutta (now Kolkata).

He was promoted to war-substantive lieutenant on 1 October 1942 and to temporary captain on 11 October 1944.

As part of the Fourteenth Army, the so-called "Forgotten Army", he served in Arakan in western Burma (now Myanmar) – where he survived dengue fever. Moore returned to the UK in February 1945, to take a training course on the inner workings of the Churchill tanks, learning to become an instructor. He did not return to the regiment, remaining as an instructor and the Technical Adjutant of the Armoured Vehicle Fighting School in Bovington Camp, Dorset until the end of the War. He was demobilised in 1946.

For 65 years, Moore organised the annual reunion for the 9th Battalion veterans.

== Career ==
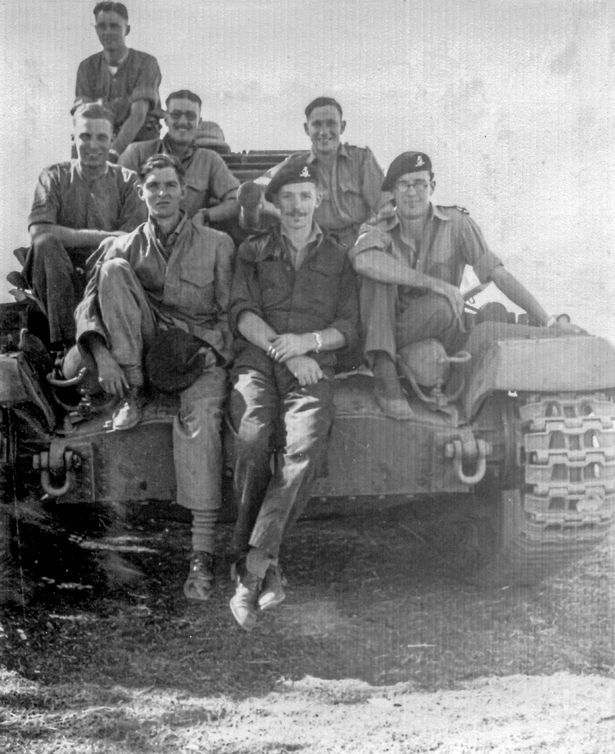
Moore as an instructor at the Armoured Fighting Vehicle School after WWII (front middle)

Moore was officially demobilised in October 1946. After leaving the army at 26 years old, he joined the family building company, the name of which was altered to W. Moore & Son (Builders) Ltd. In 1960 he took a job as a travelling salesman for a roofing materials company called Nuralite in Gravesend, Kent. Seven years later he became regional manager, for the north of England and Northern Ireland, for the company.

He was later appointed general manager of Cawoods Concrete Products Ltd., manufacturing concrete pipes in March, Cambridgeshire, with a view to restoring it to profitability or closing it down, after its owners had failed to find a buyer. Moore led a management buyout in 1983, with the assistance of local Member of Parliament Clement Freud, who also became an investor in the renamed March Concrete Products Ltd. The company traded successfully for several years until market conditions and technical issues forced the investors to sell it to Amalgamated Roadstone Corporation in 1987.

== 100th birthday walk ==
On 6 April 2020, during the COVID-19 pandemic, and with his 100th birthday approaching, Moore began a fundraising campaign for NHS Charities Together, a group of charities supporting staff, volunteers and patients in the British National Health Service (NHS). He aimed to complete one hundred 25-metre (27-yard) laps of his garden, ten laps per day, with the help of a walking frame, branding the endeavour "Tom's 100th Birthday Walk for the NHS".

The initial £1,000 goal having been realised on 10 April, the target was increased, first to £5,000, and later to £500,000 as more people around the world became involved. Contributions rose quickly after British media publicised the endeavour, beginning when Moore made a brief appearance by telephone, on Michael Ball's Sunday programme on BBC Radio 2 on 12 April. Moore, who joined Twitter in the same month, used the site to express joy at the public's generosity in donating such a large amount of money.

He achieved his target of one hundred laps on the morning of 16 April, watched at a safe distance by a guard of honour from the 1st Battalion of the Yorkshire Regiment, the regiment into which the DWR were merged in 2006. He said he would not stop, and aimed to do a second hundred.

On the morning of his 100th birthday, he had raised £30 million. The JustGiving page for his campaign closed at the end of that day; the final amount raised subsequently being stated there as £32,796,475 (plus another £6,173,663.31 expected in tax rebates under the Gift Aid scheme) – a record for a JustGiving campaign, beating the previous record of £5.2 million raised (partially posthumously) by Stephen Sutton. More than 1.5 million individuals donated.

Funds raised by Moore were spent on such things as well-being packs for National Health Service staff, facilitating rest and recuperation rooms, devices to enable hospital patients to keep in contact with family members, and community groups who support patients once discharged from hospitals. Once his campaign ended, Moore encouraged people to continue to donate, directly to the NHS Charities Together's urgent appeal, and subsequently via his own Captain Tom Foundation.

On reaching £5 million, Moore explained his motivation:

When we started off with this exercise we didn't anticipate we'd get anything near that sort of money. It's really amazing. All of them, from top to bottom, in the National Health Service, they deserve everything that we can possibly put in their place. They're all so brave. Because every morning or every night they're putting themselves into harm's way, and I think you've got to give them full marks for that effort. We're a little bit like having a war at the moment. But the doctors and the nurses, they're all on the front line, and all of us behind, we've got to supply them and keep them going with everything that they need, so that they can do their jobs even better than they're doing now.

=== Number-one single ===
To mark Moore's 100th length, the singer Michael Ball sang "You'll Never Walk Alone" for him live on BBC Breakfast. Within 24 hours, the performance was made into a digital single featuring the NHS Voices of Care Choir, and Moore's spoken words. Released by Decca Records, on 17 April, with all proceeds going to NHS Charities Together, the recording topped the United Kingdom's "The Official Big Top 40" chart. It sold almost 36,000 copies in its first 48 hours, and was the "biggest trending song" as measured by the Official Charts Company. On 24 April, it went straight to number 1 in the UK Singles Chart, making Moore the oldest person to achieve that position and meaning that he was at number 1 on his 100th birthday, and became a one-hit wonder.

Moore's bid to reach number 1 was boosted when his leading competitor, the then-current number 1 act The Weeknd, asked people via Twitter to support Moore and make him number 1 for his 100th birthday. The Weeknd's song, "Blinding Lights", duly dropped to number 2.

=== Recognition ===
On 16 April, after Moore's 100th length, a UK Government spokesman said "the Prime Minister will certainly be looking at ways to recognise Tom's heroic efforts." Brigadier Andrew Jackson, Colonel of the Yorkshire Regiment, described Moore as "an absolute legend [from] an exceptional generation that are still an inspiration for our Yorkshire soldiers today." Via video link, Moore was guest of honour at, and opened, the NHS Nightingale Hospital Yorkshire and the Humber, in Harrogate, on 21 April.

Medal ribbon of the York Medal

On 23 April, he was given a Pride of Britain award in recognition of his efforts, after "thousands of nominations" were received. He was appointed the first Honorary Colonel of the Army Foundation College in Harrogate, Yorkshire, a training centre for soldiers under 18, on his 100th birthday. When acting in that capacity, he was addressed as "Colonel Tom". He also received the York Medal for his "outstanding contribution to our military effectiveness and military reputation". He made his first visit to the college on 10 September, when he was Chief Inspecting Officer at their annual graduation parade.

On his 100th birthday, he was also named a "Point of Light" by the Prime Minister. In early May, he was awarded a gold Blue Peter badge, the highest accolade issued by the BBC Television children's programme. Keighley Town Council stated that they would grant Moore the Freedom of Keighley. On 12 May, he was granted the Freedom of the City of London, via a video call.

By 20 April, more than 800,000 people had signed a petition calling for Moore to be knighted. Late on 19 May, it was announced that he was to be made a Knight Bachelor following a special nomination by the Prime Minister. The knighthood is part of the 2020 Special Honours, and was conferred on 20 May. The investiture, by Elizabeth II, took place outdoors, in the quadrangle at Windsor Castle, on 17 July; Moore was the only person honoured at the ceremony, and it was the Queen's first official engagement in person since the start of the COVID-19 lockdown. She used the sword that had belonged to her father George VI. On 7 September, Sir Gary Hickinbottom, the Knight Principal of the Imperial Society of Knights Bachelor presented the Knight Bachelor's Certificate (the official documentation of a Knight Bachelor) to Moore at his home, and gave him the ISKB's official Neck Tie. At the same ceremony, Robert Pooley, the CEO of Pooley Sword, presented him with a Knight Bachelor's Sword.

Cranfield University, near Moore's home in Bedfordshire, awarded him an Honorary Doctorate of Science. It was presented to him by Baroness Young, Chancellor of the university, and Sir Peter Gregson, Vice-Chancellor, in a video call. He was awarded the Honorary degree of Doctor of the University (D.Univ) by the University of Bradford as part of their 2020 Graduation Ceremonies. In July, Moore became the first member and captain of the Football Association and England National Football Team's Lionhearts squad. This honour was presented by former England captain David Beckham.

==== Media ====
A number of artists painted portraits of Moore; some said they would gift the paintings to him, or sell them to raise more funds. Others depicted him in murals, including examples in Cambourne, Tamworth and Thetford. On 14 August, an official portrait painted by Alexander Chamberlin was unveiled. It is in the collection of the National Army Museum.

Moore gave over 150 media interviews. On 6 May, BBC One changed its advertised schedule to screen a 30-minute BBC News Special, Captain Tom: We Salute You, presented by Michael Ball. During the programme, Ball visited Moore at his home, and at the end of the programme the pair duetted, a cappella, the first verse of their hit single. Another UK television channel, ITV, screened a 30-minute documentary, Captain Tom's War, on 8 May, in which Moore reminisced about his military career, followed by the hour-long The Life & Times of Captain Sir Tom on 13 August. He was the guest on an episode of Piers Morgan's Life Stories on 13 September.

In November 2020, British GQ magazine named Moore its "Inspiration of the Year" as part of its Men of the Year edition. Moore also appeared on the front cover of the magazine, making him the oldest cover star in the magazine's history.

In February 2021, Lake District brand Herdy made him a "Herdy Hero" and created a free poster that people can download with one of his sayings on it.

==== Guinness World Records ====
Moore held two Guinness World Records: as the fundraiser raising the greatest amount of money in an individual charity walk, and as the oldest person to have a number-one single on the UK Singles Chart.

==== 100th birthday ====
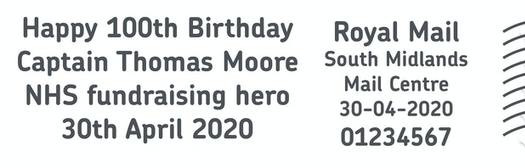
Mock-up of Royal Mail's Captain Tom Moore postmark, as used 26 April–1 May 2020

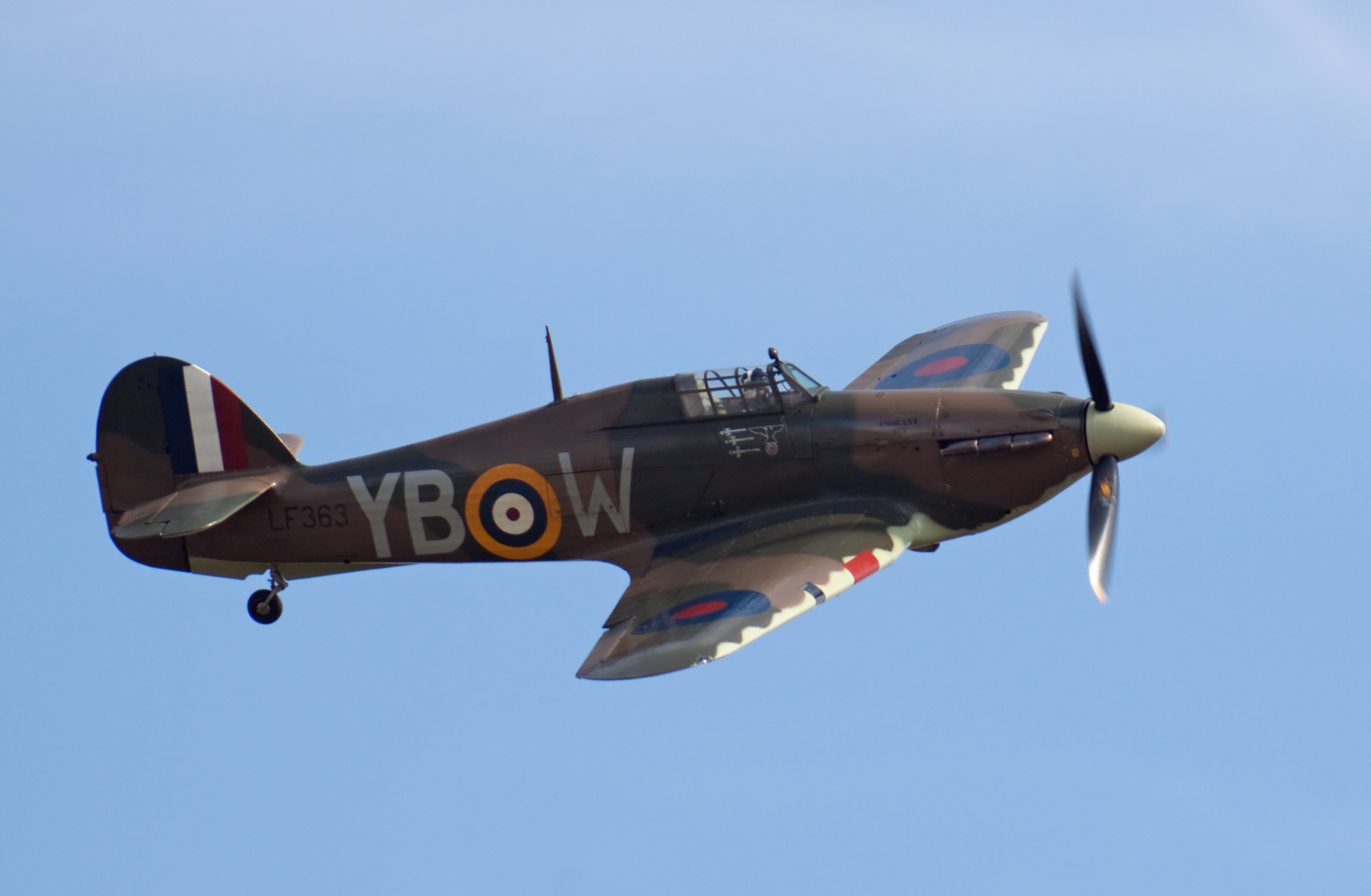
Hawker Hurricane LF363, one of the aircraft used in Captain Tom’s RAF flypast (seen in 2011)

Over a week before Moore's 100th birthday, so many cards had been sent to him that Royal Mail had had to introduce dedicated sorting facilities and around 20 volunteers were recruited to open and display them, at the local Bedford School. By his birthday, over 150,000 cards had been received.

Royal Mail announced that all stamped post between 26 April and 1 May would be postmarked "Happy 100th Birthday Captain Thomas Moore NHS fundraising hero 30th April 2020". Royal Mail also celebrated his birthday by painting a postbox, near his home, the shade of blue used by the NHS, with a golden balloon and inscription on the side.

On the morning of his birthday, a Hawker Hurricane and a Spitfire from the Royal Air Force's Battle of Britain Memorial Flight performed a flypast over Moore's house. In the afternoon, a second flypast featured two Army Air Corps helicopters, a Wildcat and an Apache.

Michael Ball appeared live on BBC Breakfast to sing "Happy Birthday to You" to Moore. Birthday congratulations were also made by Prime Minister Boris Johnson, English footballer Harry Kane, and the Prince of Wales. Moore also took a video call from the Secretary-General of the United Nations, António Guterres.

Instead of the standard 100th birthday message from Queen Elizabeth II, he received a personalised card, presented in person by the Lord Lieutenant of Bedfordshire, Helen Nellis.

==== Namesakes ====
Keighley Bus Company named one of its Optare Versa buses Captain Tom Moore on 20 April, and reprogrammed the electronic displays to show a "Thank You Captain Tom" message intermittently in between the vehicle's route and destination. A plaque inside the bus gives further information of Moore's life and fundraising. Other buses in the town, and across parent company Transdev Blazefield, displayed an intermittent "Thank You NHS" message. Alex Hornby, chief executive of Transdev Blazefield, described the vehicle as the "pride of the fleet" in dedication to Moore, thanking him for his fundraising efforts. On 25 April, bus company Stagecoach East, which runs services in Bedford where Moore lived, named one of its Alexander Dennis Enviro400 MMC double-decker buses Captain Tom Moore.

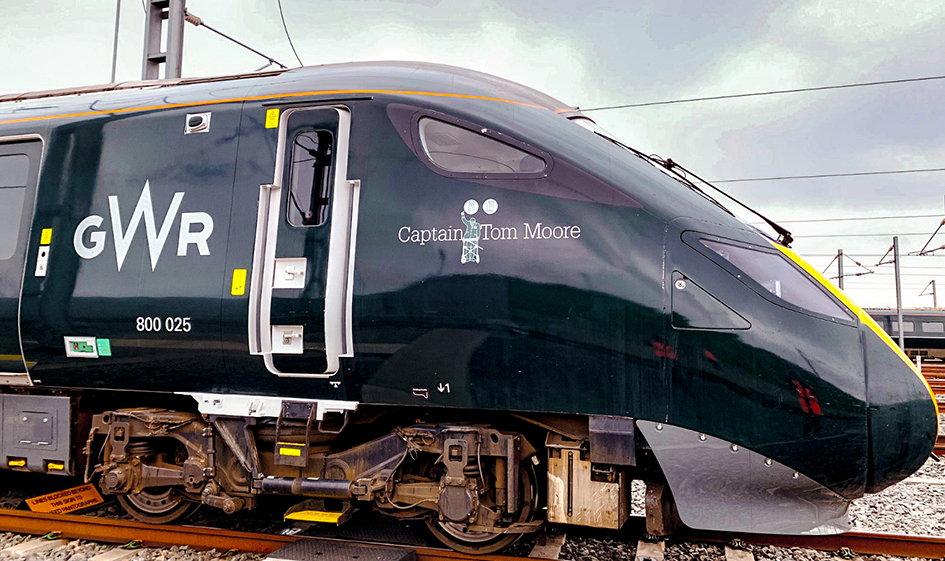
GWR's 800 025, Captain Tom Moore

On 29 April, Great Western Railway named a Class 800 train, 800 025, Captain Tom Moore. On 30 April, GB Railfreight named a Class 66, 66 731, Capt. Tom Moore – A True British Inspiration. Hornby Railways produced a OO gauge model locomotive, and donated £140,000 raised from its sales to NHS Charities. This locomotive was a record for Hornby, which sold 3,500 units in four days – on average one every two minutes and 26 seconds.

In late April, West Midlands Police named a Dutch Shepherd police dog puppy Captain Tom Moore, the name being an "overwhelming favourite" in an online vote to name dogs after "NHS heroes". World Horse Welfare named a foal, recently born at its base in Thetford, Captain Tom, after a poll on social media. A Clydesdale horse born in the Lake District on Moore's birthday was also named Captain Tom. Northamptonshire Fire and Rescue Service named a powerboat Captain Tom. Bedford Hospital also named a new landscaped garden after him.

== Medals and honours ==
Moore was awarded the following British medals and honours:

Ribbon	Description	Notes
	Knight Bachelor	20 May 2020
	1939–1945 Star	
	Burma Star	
	Defence Medal	Reissued 30 April 2020
	War Medal 1939–1945	

== Personal life ==
Moore first married in 1949 a woman who was known as "Billie". The marriage was never consummated and was subsequently annulled. In January 1968, he married Pamela, fifteen years his junior. They had two daughters: Hannah and Lucy.

Moore was a contestant on the Christmas Day 1983 edition of the BBC Television game show Blankety Blank.

When Moore was working at Cawoods and then March Concrete, the family lived in Welney in Norfolk. The couple retired to the Costa del Sol, Spain, but returned when Pamela developed a form of dementia. She spent her last years in a nursing home, where Moore would visit her every day. She died in 2006. Moore lived with his younger daughter, her husband, and two grandchildren Ben and Georgia, in Marston Moretaine, Bedfordshire, from 2008 until his death.

In 2018, he received treatment from the NHS, for a broken hip, broken rib, punctured lung and other serious injuries, following a fall. He was still recovering from these injuries when he started his fund-raising walk. The same year, he was also treated for melanoma of the head. In addition, Moore had a hip replacement and a double knee replacement. In December 2020, Moore and his family took a holiday to Barbados after British Airways paid for his flight.

== Death, tributes and funeral ==
Moore was admitted to Bedford Hospital on 12 January 2021. He was diagnosed with pneumonia and treated. Ten days later he was discharged to his home in Marston Moretaine. Both before and during his stay in hospital, Moore was tested regularly for COVID-19. On the day of his discharge, 22 January, he first tested positive for the coronavirus. He remained at home for the following nine days while receiving care and treatment. Having difficulty in breathing, Moore was re-admitted to Bedford Hospital on 31 January with COVID-19 and pneumonia. He died on 2 February, aged 100. His funeral took place on 27 February at Bedford Crematorium. Moore asked that "My Way" by Frank Sinatra be played at his funeral. The guard of honour arrived on a pair of vintage double-decker buses, including members of the Keighley and Worth Valley Railway, Keighley Cougars Rugby Club and the Bangladeshi Community Association. Moore was buried at Morton Cemetery in Riddlesden.

Many public figures, including MPs, sportsmen and celebrities paid tribute to Moore through their social media channels. The NHS Twitter account issued a statement saying "Thanks for everything, Sir Tom ♥".

Buckingham Palace issued a statement: "The Queen is sending a private message of condolence to the family of Captain Sir Tom Moore. Her Majesty very much enjoyed meeting Captain Sir Tom and his family at Windsor last year. Her thoughts and those of the Royal Family are with them".

The Prime Minister, Boris Johnson, called Moore "a hero in the truest sense of the word" and praised him for both his military service and fundraising efforts. Johnson also announced that the flags above 10 and 11 Downing Street would be flown at half-mast as a sign of respect. Johnson also appealed to the country to join the national clap for Moore at 6 pm on 3 February 2021.

Both Houses of Parliament observed a one-minute silence in honour of Moore on 3 February. The BBC News special programme Captain Tom: We Salute You was re-broadcast on BBC One the same evening.

A change.org petition calling for Moore to receive a state funeral received almost 200,000 signatures within the first two days of being launched.

Radio DJ Amanda Holden announced during the 3 February edition of the Heart Breakfast radio show that she was launching a campaign calling for an official memorial statue of Moore to be erected. Holden's campaign received support from the Daily Mail, Health Secretary Matt Hancock, and members of Moore's family. In a debate on Good Morning Britain on 4 February, TV presenter Nick Knowles suggested that Moore's statue should be placed permanently on the fourth plinth of Trafalgar Square, whereas Carol Vorderman suggested Moore should have a memorial stone in Westminster Abbey.

On 4 February, Mia Mottley, the Prime Minister of Barbados, who had met Moore during his visit to Barbados, issued a statement of condolence on behalf of herself and her nation, after learning of his death. Col. Glyne Grannum, Chief of Staff of the Barbados Defence Force, who met Capt. Tom along with other Barbadian veterans also extended farewell condolences along with the PM.

On 27 February 2021, Moore's funeral was held, and he was cremated. Six members of the Yorkshire Regiment, of which Moore was a member, carried his coffin, with an honour guard of 14 firing three volleys and a World War II-era Douglas C-47 Dakota, part of the Battle of Britain Memorial Flight, performing a fly-past. Due to COVID-19 restrictions, only eight members of his immediate family attended, but it was televised. The service also featured Moore's recording of 'You'll Never Walk Alone', Vera Lynn's anthem "White Cliffs of Dover" and Michael Bublé's rendition of "Smile"'. His family said that once COVID-19 restrictions allow, Moore's ashes would be interred in the Moore family plot in Yorkshire. This was done on 5 July 2021; the epitaph on his gravestone was "I told you I was old", a reference to the epitaph of Spike Milligan: "I told you I was ill".

== Captain Tom Foundation ==
The Captain Tom Foundation was incorporated on 5 May 2020 as a charitable company limited by guarantee, and the charity was registered with the Charity Commission for England and Wales on 5 June 2020. Its declared objectives include the improvement of physical and mental health and wellbeing; providing support and relief to those in genuine need of any kind; the promotion of social inclusion and prevention of social exclusion; and the advancement of any other charitable purposes as the trustees see fit. Describing the aims of the foundation, in the prologue of Captain Tom's memoir ‘Tomorrow Will Be a Good Day’, published in September 2020 he wrote: '[The Captain Sir Tom Foundations] goals are those closest to my heart, with a mission to combat loneliness, support hospices and help those facing bereavement – all in the wake of the unprecedented crisis we found ourselves in.' Elsewhere, Captain Tom spoke in detail about his wish to tackle loneliness and social exclusion, in both the old and young.

Moore's daughter, Hannah Ingram-Moore, and her husband, Colin, became trustees of the charity in February 2021.

The British media reported in June 2022 that the Charity Commission would investigate the foundation after questions arose regarding its financial relationship to members of the Ingram-Moore family. As of July 2023, the investigation was still in progress.

The Foundation stopped accepting donations in July 2023, following controversy arising from the construction of a building in the grounds of the Ingram-Moore family house in Marston Moretaine. Planning permission had been granted to the foundation for a structure which was intended to be used partly in connection with its charitable objectives. However, the structure constructed was actually a pool house which was larger than specified in the planning application. Central Bedfordshire Council ordered the building to be demolished. In November 2023 the family appealed against the demolition order but this was rejected. The Planning Inspectorate judged the building harmful to the Grade II-listed family home and the building was required to be demolished within three months. Demolition commenced in January 2024 and was completed by early February.

In June 2024, the Charity Commission disqualified Ingram-Moore and her husband from serving as charity trustees for ten and eight years, respectively. The family announced they would not appeal the decision. An inquiry by the Commission reported in November that year that Ingram-Moore and her husband were "culpable of “serious and repeated” instances of misconduct, mismanagement and failures of integrity", with examples including a £1.5 million book deal presented as for the benefit of the foundation only enriching the family as well as attempting to have herself appointed as CEO of the foundation on a £150,000 annual salary.

== Legacy ==
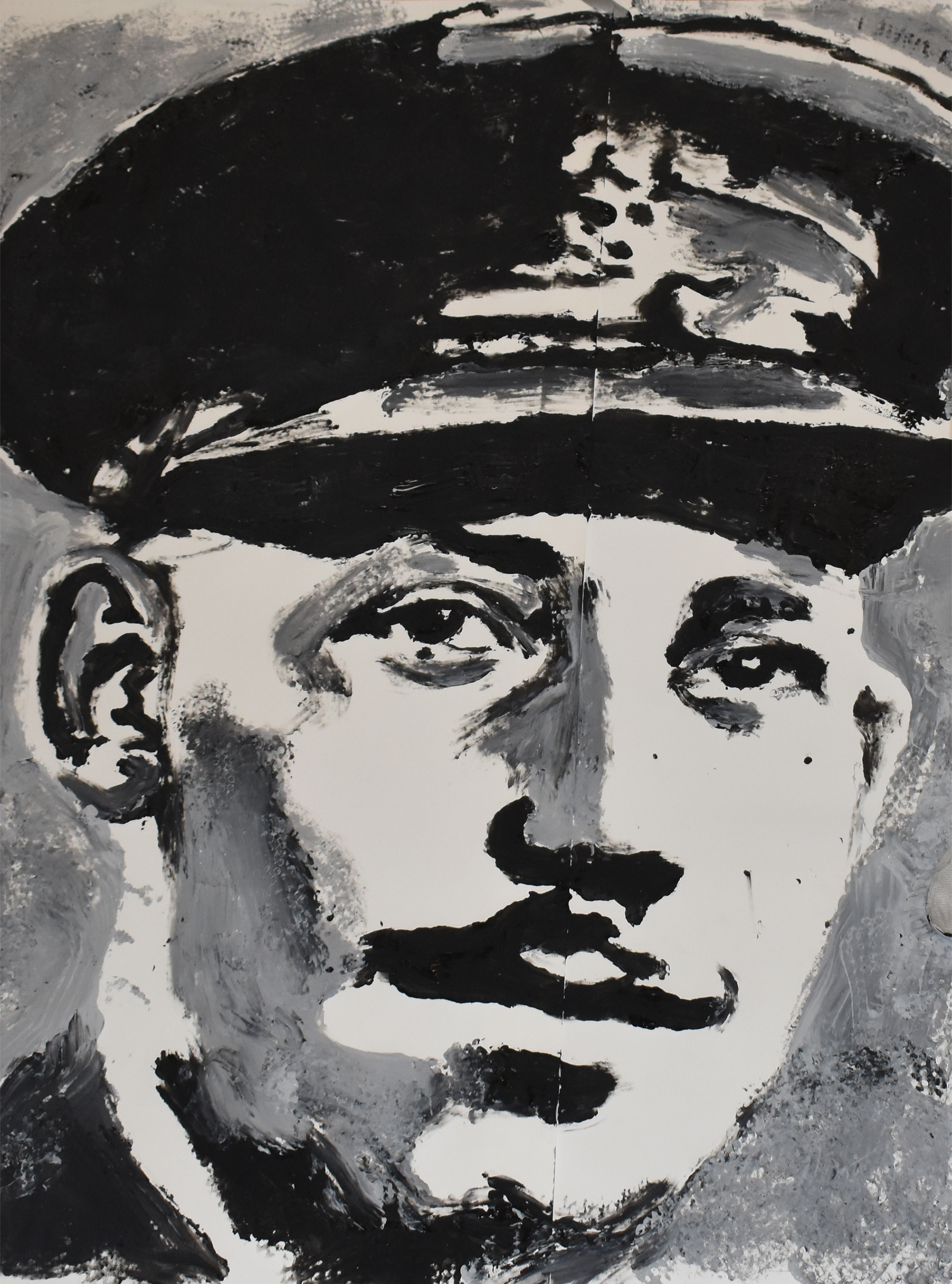
Portrait by Nathan Wyburn, painted with his feet, April 2020

A mural was created, in honour of Moore, in Pontefract, West Yorkshire, in April 2020. Moore was among a number of subjects for graffiti art created by Pontefract artist Rachel List. On 30 April 2020, a 12-foot-high (3.7-metre) mural, by newsagent and artist Paul Cable, on the wall of a popular restaurant in Abergavenny, Monmouthshire, was unveiled as a tribute to Moore on his 100th birthday.

In May 2020 he inspired Russian veteran Zinaida Korneeva to raise funds to support doctors affected by COVID-19, and the project "Appeal to Tom Moore" was launched.

In September 2020, it was announced that a biopic of Moore's life was being produced by Fred Films and Powder Keg Pictures. Upon hearing the announcement, Moore commented: "I don't know of any 100-year-old actors, but I'm sure Michael Caine or Anthony Hopkins could do a wonderful job if they were prepared to age up!". The film is being produced and written by Nick Moorcroft and Meg Leonard.

A depiction of Moore featured in the 2020–21 New Year's Eve fireworks display in London, set to the Jess Glynne song "I'll Be There".

At a press conference to mark his own 61st birthday on 19 February 2021, Naruhito, the Japanese Emperor, spoke of Captain Tom's achievements and words as one of the things that had impressed him over the past year.
