= Gooderstone =

Village in Norfolk, England

Coordinates: 52.587835°N 0.601598°E

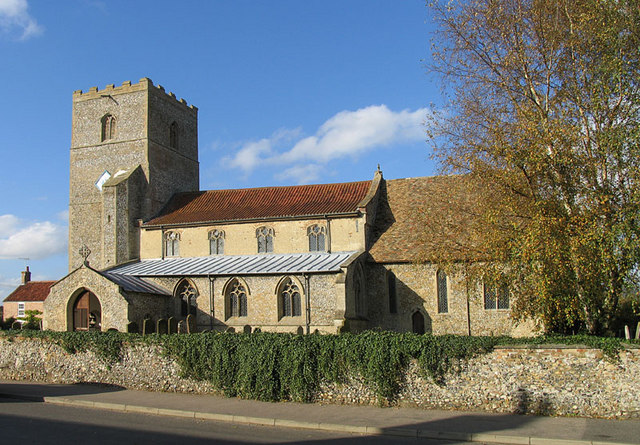
- St George's, Gooderstone

- Location within Norfolk
- Area: 4.36 sq mi (11.3 km^{2})
- Population: 400 (2021 census)
  - Density: 92/sq mi (36/km^{2})
- OS grid reference: TF7622002111
- District: Breckland
- Shire county: Norfolk
- Region: East
- Country: England
- Sovereign state: United Kingdom
- Post town: King's Lynn
- Postcode district: PE33
- Dialling code: 01366
- Police: Norfolk
- Fire: Norfolk
- Ambulance: East of England
- UK Parliament: South West Norfolk

Gooderstone is a village and civil parish in the English county of Norfolk.

The village is located 5.7 miles (9.2 km) south-west of Swaffham and 30 miles (48 km) west of Norwich.

== History ==
Gooderstone's name is of Anglo-Saxon origin and derives from the Old English for Guthere's farm or settlement.

In the Domesday Book of 1086, Gooderstone is listed as a settlement of 39 households in the hundred of South Greenhoe. In 1086, the village was part of the East Anglian estates of Godric the Steward.

During the First World War, a night airfield was built in Gooderstone which was repurposed during the Second World War as a bombing decoy site.

== Geography ==
According to the 2021 census, Gooderstone has a population of 400 people which shows an increase from the 363 people recorded in the 2011 census.

The church is located along the course of the River Gadder.

== St George's Church ==
Gooderstone's parish church is dedicated to Saint George and dates from the 13th century. The church is located within the village on Church View and has been Grade I listed since 1960. The church is no longer open for Sunday services.

St George's was lightly restored in the Victorian era and features 16th-century pews and dado screen.

== Amenities ==
Gooderston Cricket Club has been registered for over a hundred year and fields a First XI and a Friendly Side.

Gooderstone Primary is a Church of England school and is part of the Diocese of Norwich Academies Trust. The headteacher is Mrs S. Godbold.

Gooderstone Water Gardens and Nature Trail is open daily throughout the year.

== Governance ==
Gooderstone is part of the electoral ward of Bedingfeld for local elections and is part of the district of Breckland.

The village's national constituency is South West Norfolk which has been represented by Labour's Terry Jermy MP since 2024.

== War Memorial ==
Gooderstone War Memorial is located on the wall of St George's Churchyard and is a square plinth with a tall Latin cross. The memorial lists the following names for the First World War:

Rank	Name	Unit	Date of death	Burial/Commemoration
Sgt.	Ernest W. Woolsey	1st The Royal Dragoons	25 Nov. 1918	Aldershot Military Cemetery
Cpl.	Ernest E. Calver	13th Bn., Royal Sussex Regiment	21 Oct. 1916	Thiepval Memorial
LCpl.	John W. G. Burt	3rd Dragoon Guards	23 Mar. 1918	Pozières Memorial
LCpl.	Herbert Palmer	20th Bn., King's Royal Rifle Corps	20 Oct. 1917	St Julien Cemetery
LCpl.	Victor Cook	164th Coy., Machine Gun Corps	6 Jul. 1917	Vlamertinge Cemetery
Gnr.	Albert V. Dixon	208th Bty., Royal Garrison Artillery	27 Dec. 1916	Grove Town Cemetery
Pte.	Walter Flatt	2nd Bn., Bedfordshire Regiment	22 Mar. 1918	Pozières Memorial
Pte.	Horace E. Lambert	6th Bn., Royal Berkshire Regiment	28 Sep. 1916	Thiepval Memorial
Pte.	Arthur J. Mountain	50th (Calgary) Bn., CEF	18 Nov. 1916	Adanac Military Cemetery
Pte.	Edgar F. Brown	2nd Bn., Royal Dublin Fusiliers	5 Oct. 1916	Lahana War Cemetery
Pte.	S. Edward Barrett	6th Bn., Lincolnshire Regiment	3 Sep. 1915	Hill 10 Cemetery
Pte.	Victor Dodd	1st Bn., Norfolk Regiment	20 Nov. 1914	Menin Gate
Pte.	Baker C. Sayer	2nd Bn., Norfolk Regt.	22 Jul. 1916	Basra War Cemetery
Pte.	R. Holman Shinn	2nd Bn., Norfolk Regt.	6 Mar. 1916	Amara War Cemetery
Pte.	William H. Sayer	9th Bn., Norfolk Regt.	19 Apr. 1917	Vermelles British Cemetery
Pte.	Arthur S. Tuddenham	1st Bn., Northumberland Fusilers	14 May 1917	Duisans Cemetery
Pte.	George F. Crome	10th Bn., Queen's Own Regiment	12 Jul. 1918	Lijssenthoek Cemetery
Rfn.	Frederick Palmer	12th Bn., Rifle Brigade	6 Jun. 1916	Menin Gate

The following names were added after the Second World War:

Rank	Name	Unit	Date of death	Burial/Commemoration
Cpl.	Herbert R. E. Waters	7th Bn., Royal Norfolk Regiment	29 May 1941	Poznań Cemetery
Cpl.	Herbert Adcock	18th Regt., Reconnaissance Corps	12 Sep. 1944	Kranji War Memorial
St1C	Bernard Adcock	HMS Sphinx	4 Feb. 1940	Wick Cemetery

== See also ==
- Gooderstone Warren
