= Battle of Caribou Hill =

- Part of the Gallipoli campaign of Middle Eastern theatre of World War I
Date	4 November 1915
Location	Gallipoli peninsula, Adrianople Vilayet, Ottoman Empire 40°19′39.10″N 26°16′26.87″E
Result	Newfoundland victory
Territorial changes	Newfoundland forces capture the hill

Belligerents
British Empire: Newfoundland	Ottoman Empire

Commanders and leaders
(Dominion of Newfoundland) James Donnelly	(Ottoman Empire) Unknown

Units involved
Newfoundland Regiment	Unknown

Casualties and losses
Unknown	Unknown

The Battle of Caribou Hill was a battle which took place during the Gallipoli campaign of World War I

== Battle ==
On the night of 4 November 1915, James Donnelly of the Newfoundland Regiment led 7 men to the ridge which was held by Turkish snipers. When the Ottoman soldiers came to their positions, they were met with rifle fire from Donnelly's men. At the same time, the rest of the Newfoundland Regiment was sent to the nearby knoll where they encountered an Ottoman patrol. After a firefight, the Ottoman patrol was driven off. The hill was then captured by the Newfoundlanders.

== Aftermath and Legacy ==
The Battle of Caribou Hill was the first battle honor earned by the Newfoundland Regiment during the Gallipoli campaign. After the battle, the ridge was named "Caribou Hill" in honor of the Newfoundland Regiment. For his actions during the battle, James Donnelly was awarded the Military Cross while Sargent W.M. Green and Private R.E. Hynes received the Distinguished Conduct Medal and Lance Corporal F. Snow received the Military Medal. In 2018, Turkey granted the Government of Newfoundland and Labrador permission to install a monument to commemorate the Newfoundland Regiment and their actions during the battle. The monument, known as the Gallipoli Newfoundland Memorial was unveiled in September 2022. It is located near the Hill 10 Commonwealth War Graves Commission Cemetery.
