= Stewart Loudoun-Shand =

Recipient of the Victoria Cross

Stewart Walter Loudoun-Shand
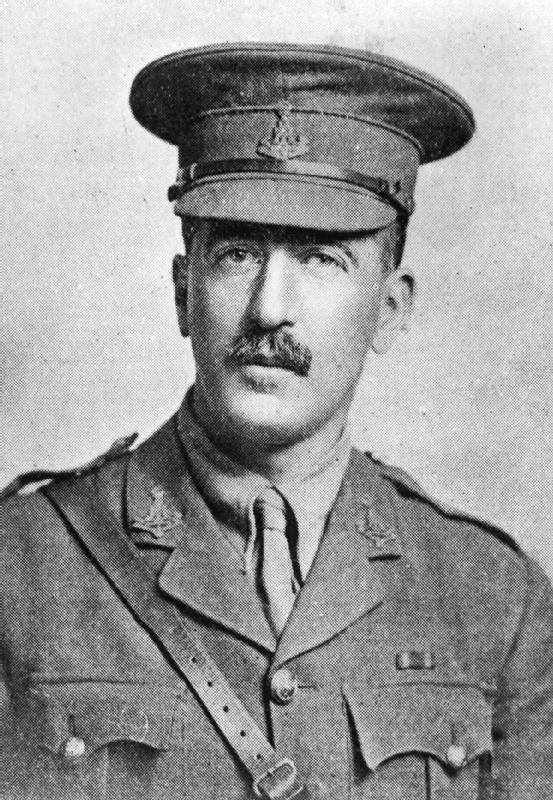
- Born: Stewart Walter Shand; 8 October 1879; Ceylon
- Died: 1 July 1916 (aged 36); Near Fricourt, France
- Burial place: Norfolk Cemetery, Bécordel-Bécourt
- Military career
- Allegiance: United Kingdom
- Branch: British Army
- Service years: 1899–1901; 1914–1916
- Rank: Major
- Units: London Scottish; Pembroke Yeomanry; Yorkshire Regiment (Alexandra, Princess of Wales's Own)
- Commands: 10th (Service) Battalion, Yorkshire Regiment (Alexandra, Princess of Wales's Own)
- Conflicts: Second Boer War; First World War: Battle of Loos; Battle of the Somme; First day on the Somme †
- Awards: Victoria Cross

Major Stewart Walter Loudoun-Shand VC (8 October 1879 – 1 July 1916) was a British recipient of the Victoria Cross (VC), the highest and most prestigious award for gallantry in the face of the enemy that can be awarded to British and Commonwealth forces. He was posthumously awarded the VC for his actions during an attack near the French village of Fricourt on the opening day of the Battle of the Somme.

== Early life ==
Stewart Walter Shand was born on 8 October 1879 in Ceylon, and was one of ten children of John Shand, a tea planter, and his wife Lucy née Lawson. Both his parents were originally from Scotland. The family, wealthy from trading in tea, later moved to South London. They lived in Dulwich, where all the boys of the family attended Dulwich College. Stewart excelled at sport, especially cricket. His brother, Eric, later represented Scotland in Rugby union.

== South Africa ==
Shand was working at a bank when the Second Boer War broke out in South Africa in 1899. He volunteered for the British Army's London Scottish Regiment but was not considered for service in South Africa on account of his age. He transferred to the Pembroke Yeomanry and was posted to its 9th Battalion, and with them was able to participate in the war. Having attained the rank of lance corporal, his service ended in 1901 but he remained in South Africa, working for a merchant company at Port Elizabeth. He left after a few years to take up a position in Ceylon, his place of birth, as a tea merchant; his father was instrumental in securing him the role.

== First World War ==
On the outbreak of the First World War, Loudoun-Shand, as he was now known following the change by deed poll of his family name, travelled to England to volunteer for service with the British Army. He was commissioned as a lieutenant and posted to the 10th Battalion of The Yorkshire Regiment. He spent the next several months training in the Surrey region with the battalion and, in June 1915, was promoted to captain.

The 10th Battalion arrived on the Western Front in September 1915, as part of the 62nd Brigade, 21st Division. Shortly afterwards, it fought in the Battle of Loos. Casualties in the battalion as the result of its role in the battle were such that in December, Loudoun-Shand was promoted to temporary major and given command of a company. He was wounded the following March but was only out of the frontline for a few days.

For 1 July 1916, the opening day of the Battle of the Somme, the 62nd Brigade was tasked with securing the area around the village of Fricourt, held by the Germans. Loudoun-Shand's company was part of a second wave of attacks that followed the initial assault that commenced at 7:30 am. In the face of heavy machine gun fire, his men were reluctant to advance from their trenches. To encourage them forward, he leapt on the parapet of the trench and despite the danger from machine gun fire, urged and encouraged his men forward. He was soon wounded but remained in the frontline and continued to urge his men forward until he died of his wounds. For his actions, he was recommended for the Victoria Cross (VC). The VC, instituted in 1856, was the highest award for valour that could be bestowed on a soldier of the British Empire. The citation reads as follows:

"For most conspicuous bravery. When his company attempted to climb over the parapet to attack the enemy's trenches, they were met by very fierce machine gun fire, which temporarily stopped their progress. Maj. Loudoun-Shand immediately leapt on the parapet, helped the men over it, and encouraged them in every way until he fell mortally wounded. Even then he insisted on being propped up in the trench, and went on encouraging the non-commissioned officers and men until he died."

— London Gazette, 8 September 1916

Casualties were high amongst Loudoun-Shand's company, and by the conclusion of the day, 94 of the 122 men who commenced the attack had been wounded or killed. Loudoun-Shand is buried at the Commonwealth War Graves Commission's Norfolk Cemetery at Becordel-Becourt, near the Somme. His name is among those listed on the Dulwich College War Memorial and is on the Loudoun-Shand memorial at the West Norwood Cemetery.

== Medals ==
Loudoun-Shand's VC was presented to his father by King George V in a ceremony at Buckingham Palace on 31 March 1917. The VC, along with his service medals from the First World War and the Second Boer War, were retained in his family for some time until purchased by Lord Ashcroft in 2005. They are displayed in the Lord Ashcroft Gallery at the Imperial War Museum in London.
