= Cemetery Hill (disambiguation) =

Cemetery Hill refers to numerous cemeteries on hills and to summits themselves:

- Cemetery Hill, Oregon, a cemetery in Washington County (GNIS Feature ID 47625)
- Cemetery Hill, South Carolina, a cemetery in Spartanburg County (GNIS Feature ID 1221470)
- Cemetery Hill, Texas, a cemetery in Denton County (GNIS Feature ID 1332512)
- Cemetery Hill, Alabama, a cemetery in Calhoun County (GNIS Feature ID 115826)
- Cemetery Hill (Georgia), a summit in Greene County (GNIS Feature ID 348655)
- Cemetery Hill (Livingston County, Kentucky), a summit near Smithland (GNIS Feature ID 489257)
- Cemetery Hill (Maine), a summit in Penobscot County (GNIS Feature ID 563743)
- Cemetery Hill (Montana), a summit in Lewis and Clark County (GNIS Feature ID 800576)
- Cemetery Hill (Nevada), a summit in Nye County (GNIS Feature ID 859192)
- Cemetery Hill (New Hampshire), a summit in Sullivan County (GNIS Feature ID 866071)
- Cemetery Hill (Ohio), a summit in Highland County (GNIS Feature ID 1058557)
- Cemetery Hill (Pennsylvania), the Gettysburg National Cemetery landform (GNIS Feature ID 1171412)
  - Cemetery Hill (game), a war game named for the Gettysburg hill
  - East Cemetery Hill, the Gettysburg Battlefield location of the battle of East Cemetery Hill
- Cemetery Hill (Multnomah County, Oregon), a summit near Washougal (GNIS Feature ID 1136136)
- Cemetery Hill (Polk County, Oregon), a summit near Monmouth (GNIS Feature ID 1162883)
- Cemetery Hill (Washington County, Pennsylvania), a summit near the town of Washington (GNIS Feature ID 1171413)
- Cemetery Hill (South Dakota), a summit in Mellette County (GNIS Feature ID 1266591)
- Cemetery Hill (Wisconsin), a summit in Juneau County (GNIS Feature ID 1562876)
- Cemetery Hill (Mariposa County, California), a summit near Merced Falls (GNIS Feature ID 1659709)
- Cemetery Hill (Wallowa County, Oregon), a summit near Imaha (GNIS Feature ID 1851670)
- Cemetery Hill (Vermont), a summit in Orleans County (GNIS Feature ID 1919957)
- Cemetery Hill (Connecticut), a summit in Litchfield County (GNIS Feature ID 1931866)
- Cemetery Hill (Washington County, Kentucky), a summit near Springfield (GNIS Feature ID 2567716)
- Cemetery Hill (Henry County, Kentucky), a summit near Gratz (GNIS Feature ID 2568581)

Cemetery Hill may also refer to differently-named locations with, or named for, cemeteries:

- Boot Hill, the name of numerous United States cemeteries
- Burial Hill, in Plymouth, Massachusetts
- Cemetery Mountain, a summit in Talladega County, Alabama (GNIS Feature ID 159353)
- Hill 10 Commonwealth War Graves Commission Cemetery, in Turkey
- Indian Mound Cemetery, in West Virginia
- Radio Hill (California), a summit in Plumas County (GNIS Feature ID 265127)
- Spong Hill, in Norfolk, England
