= Edward Chippindall =

British Army general

Lieutenant-General Edward Chippindall, CB (4 October 1827 – 13 September 1902) was a British Army officer in the Crimean War and in various expeditions in British India.

== Military career ==
Chippindall was born in 1827, and had two brothers, Rev. J. Chippindall and Robert Chippindall.

He was commissioned an ensign in the 32nd (Cornwall) Regiment of Foot on 10 December 1847. He saw active service in the Second Anglo-Sikh War, and was present at the Siege of Multan and the Battle of Gujrat (Feb 1849), shortly before which he was promoted to lieutenant on 9 January 1849. Promoted to captain on 23 December 1853, he transferred to the 19th Regiment of Foot (later the Yorkshire regiment) and took part in the Crimean War (1854–1855), received a brevet promotion to major on 2 November 1855 and a substantive promotion to major on 28 November 1857.

Then followed 18 years of service in India, during which he received a brevet promotion to lieutenant-colonel on 9 March 1865. He commanded the 1st battalion of his regiment in the 1868 Hazara campaign, including the expedition against the tribes on the Black Mountain, for which he was mentioned in despatches, received the medal and was appointed a Companion of the Order of the Bath (CB). Receiving a substantive promotion to lieutenant-colonel on 7 March 1870, he was promoted to the rank of colonel on 14 August 1872. He returned to England with his regiment, and took command of the regimental depot in Yorkshire. He was eventually promoted to major-general on 13 February 1885, and to lieutenant-general on 22 December 1886, when he retired from active service.

He lived in Barrow upon Soar for the last 20 years of his life, and was a member of the Quorn Hounds.

He was appointed Colonel of The Princess of Wales's Own (Yorkshire Regiment) - known as the Green Howards – on 16 November 1896, and served as such until his death. He was an Aide-de-camp to Queen Victoria.

Chippindall died in Newport, Essex on 13 September 1902.

Military offices
Preceded by Sir Robert Onesiphorus Bright	Colonel of Alexandra, Princess of Wales's Own (Yorkshire Regiment); 1896–1902	Succeeded by William Spencer Cooper
