= River Gadder =

River in Norfolk, England

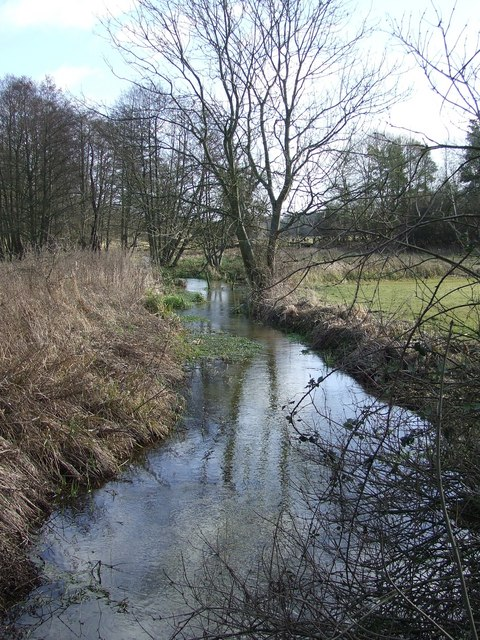
- River Gadder at Cockley Cley

- Location of within Norfolk

Location
- Country: England
- State: Norfolk
- Region: East of England
- District: Breckland

Physical characteristics
- Source: 0.6 miles (0.97 km) north-east of Home Farm
  - location: Cockley Cley, Breckland
  - coordinates: 52°36′58.82″N 0°52′43.36″E
- Mouth
  - location: River Wissey
  - coordinates: 52.56612°N 0.558124°E
- Length: 10.4 km (6.5 mi)

The River Gadder is 10.4 km (6.5 mi) long tributary of the River Wissey. It rises from a tiny headwater in the north-east of the parish of Cockley Cley in the English county of Norfolk. The river rises in a watermeadow 0.6 miles (0.97 km) north east of Home Farm.

== The course ==
From its head the river runs in a south-westerly direction through a shallow valley surrounded by the breckland landscape towards the village of Cockley Cley. The river skirts the southern edge of the village and provides a haven for wildlife. The grasslands either side of the river are protected under the Environmentally Sensitive Area (ESA) scheme. Various species of fish including stickleback, bullhead and brown trout can be viewed in the river's crystal clear water.

=== Gooderstone Water Gardens ===
Further downstream the river reaches Gooderstone. The village takes its name from the river. Gooderstone Water Gardens were created by retired farmer Billy Knights in 1970 from a wet meadow. They cover an area of 6.5 acres (26,000 m^{2}) beside the river. There are four ponds, waterways, 13 bridges, flat grassy paths, mature trees and shrubs and colourful bog plants and border perennials. Amenities include a tearoom, plant sales, toilets for disabled people and seating areas throughout the garden. A 8.5 acres (34,000 m^{2}) wildlife area has been put aside together with a kingfisher hide

=== Oxborough and Oxburgh Hall ===
The river now heads towards Oxborough and here the river's waters are used to feeds the moat around Oxburgh Hall. Today the hall is in the care of the National Trust. Built around 1482 by Sir Edmund Bedingfield. Oxburgh has always been a family home, not a fortress. The manor of Oxburgh came to the Bedingfeld family by marriage before 1446, and the house has been continuously inhabited by them since their construction of it in 1482, the date of Edward Bedingfeld's licence to crenellate. After running a course of 6.4 miles (10.3 km) the river joins the River Wissey on its northern bank close to Oxborough Hythe.

== Gallery ==
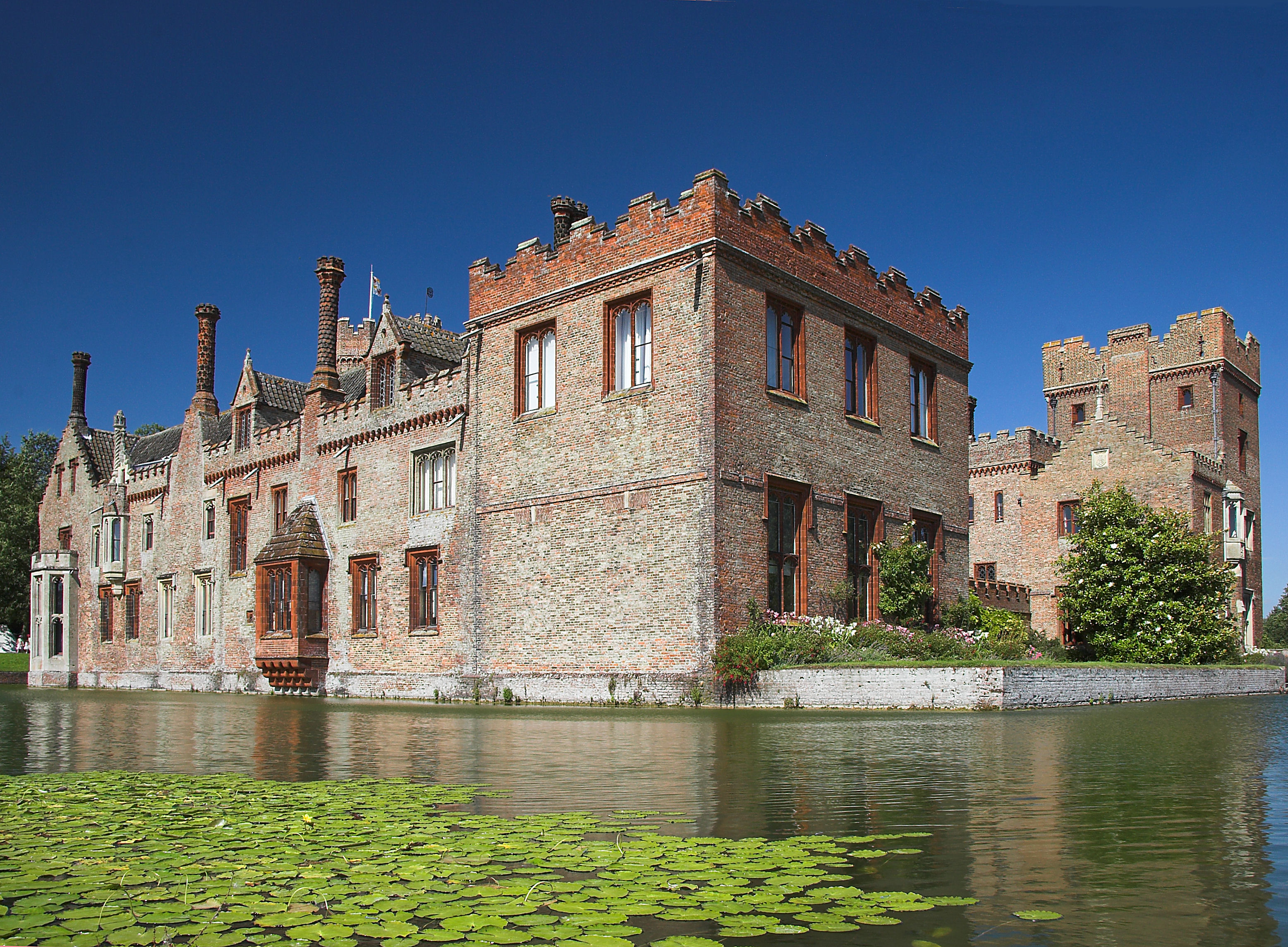
Oxburgh Hall moat is fed by the waters of the Gadder.
