= Abraham Josias Cloëté =

Afrikaner senior officer in the British Army

General Sir Abraham Josias Cloëté KCB
- Born: Abraham Josias Cloëté; 7 August 1794; Cape Town, Cape Colony
- Died: 26 October 1886 (aged 92) Marylebone, London, England
- Allegiance: United Kingdom
- Branch: British Army
- Service years: 1809–1877
- Rank: General
- Conflicts: Third Anglo-Maratha War; Xhosa Wars
- Awards: KCB, KH

General Sir Abraham Josias Cloëté KCB (7 August 1794 – 26 October 1886) was an Afrikaner senior officer in the British Army.

He was born in Cape Town, the son of Pieter Lourens Cloëté, member of the council of the Cape of Good Hope, and Catharina Maria Van Zeeman. On 29 January 1809, he joined the British Army as a cornet in the 16th Hussars.

He transferred to the 15th Hussars on their return from Corunna, serving with them during the Burdett riots of 1810 and the Luddite disturbances in the Midlands and Lancashire of the following years. In 1813 he exchanged as a captain to the 21st Light Dragoons at the Cape, where he acted as aide-de-camp to the newly appointed governor, Lord Charles Somerset. Whilst stationed there he commanded a military detachment, made up of volunteers from regiments at the Cape, which occupied the remote desert island of Tristan da Cunha soon after the arrival of the Emperor Napoleon on Saint Helena and also fought a duel with the army surgeon James Barry. He rose through the ranks to lieutenant (17 May 1810) and captain (5 November 1812).

In 1817, he went with his regiment to India, serving with a squadron employed as a field force in Cuttack, on the frontiers of Orissa and Bihar, during the Third Anglo-Maratha War of 1817–19. The 21st Dragoons (except a detachment on Saint Helena) were disbanded in England in May 1819 and Cloëté was placed on half-pay.

In 1820, he was occupied as deputy-assistant quartermaster-general, in superintending the landing and settling of a large body of government immigrants, known as 1820 Settlers, on the eastern frontier of the Cape Colony. In 1822 he was sent home with important despatches, made brevet major on 21 November 1822, and appointed town-major of Cape Town, a post he held until 1840. He was promoted lieutenant-colonel on 10 January 1837 and given the honour of KH. In 1840 he was appointed deputy quartermaster-general at the Cape, and retained the post until 1854, by which time he had been promoted Colonel (11 November 1851).

In 1842, he was sent with reinforcements from Cape Town to relieve a small force under Captain Smith of the 27th (Inniskilling) Regiment of Foot, which was besieged by insurgent Boers near Port Natal (now Durban), when his firm action not only prevented battle, but prepared the way for permanent settlement of the subsequent colony of Natal. He was quartermaster-general in the Xhosa Wars of 1846, was mentioned in despatches, and in 1848 made C.B. He was chief of the staff with the army in the field in the Kaffir war of 1851–3, including the operations in the Basuto country, and at the Battle of Berea, where he commanded a division. He was knighted for his services in 1854.

Promoted major-general on the staff (19 January 1856), he commanded the troops in the Windward and Leeward Islands from 1855 to 1861. He was given the colonelcy for life of the 19th Foot in 1861 and made KCB in 1862. He became Lieutenant-general on 12 February 1863 and full General on 25 October 1871.

He was placed on the retired list in 1877 and died at his London home in 1886. He had married in Barbados, on 8 May 1857, Anne Woollcombe Louis, the granddaughter of the late Rear-admiral Sir Thomas Louis, baronet, with whom he had a son and a daughter.

== Sources ==
- This article incorporates text from a publication now in the public domain: Chichester, Henry Manners (1887). "Cloëté, Abraham Josias". In Stephen, Leslie (ed.). Dictionary of National Biography. Vol. 11. London: Smith, Elder & Co. p. 120.

Military offices
Preceded by Sir William Rowan	Colonel of the 19th (The 1st Yorkshire North Riding) Regiment of Foot; 1861–1886	Succeeded by Sir Robert Onesiphorus Bright
