= Norfolk Cemetery =

WWI CWGC cemetery in Somme, France

- Commonwealth War Graves Commission
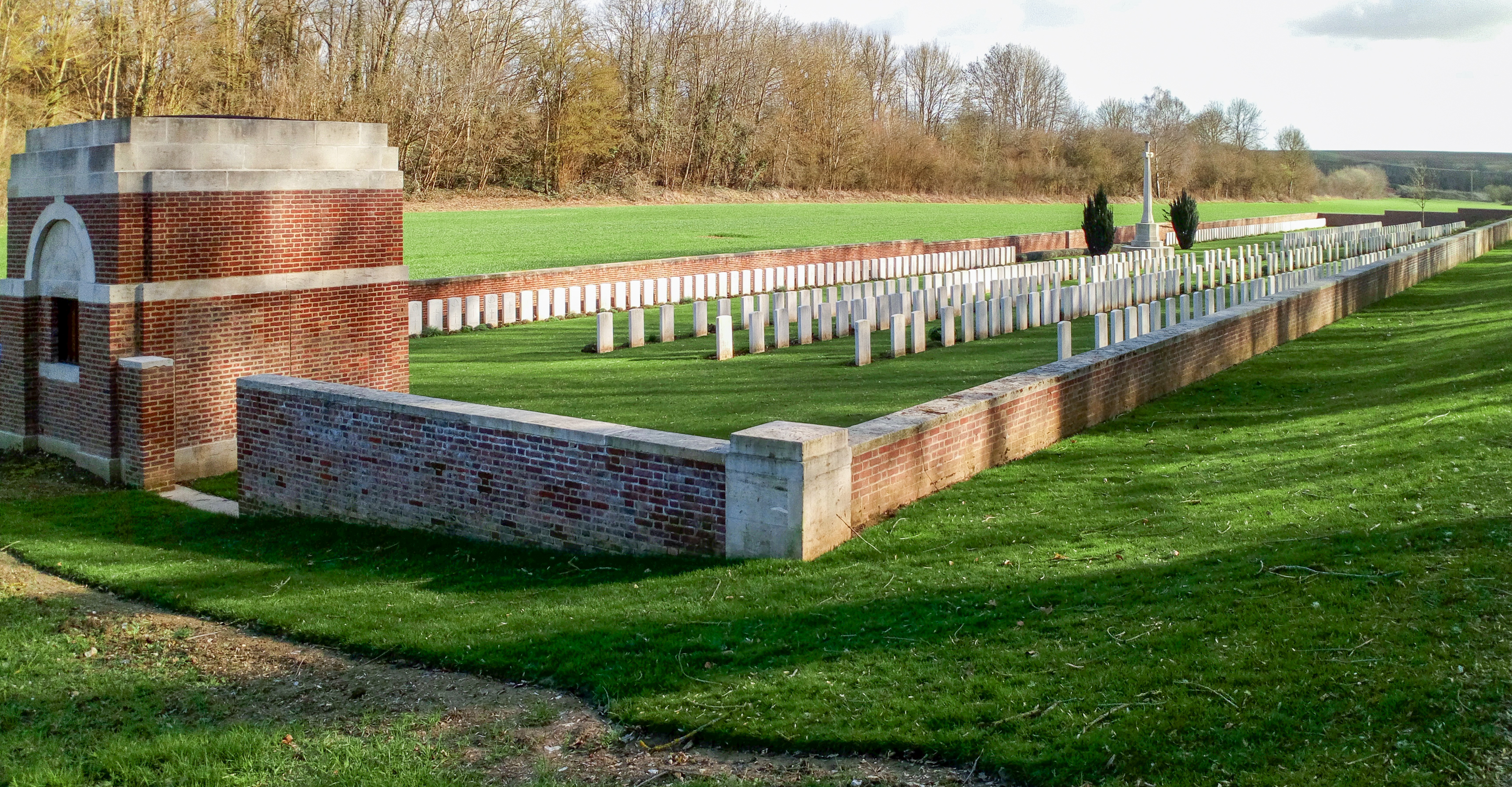
- Used for those deceased 1915–1916
- Established: 1915
- Location: 49°59′56″N 2°41′35″E near Albert, Somme, France
- Designed by: Herbert Baker
- Total burials: 549
- Unknowns: 224

Burials by nation
- Allied Powers: United Kingdom: 318; Australia: 6; Canada: 1; India: 1; Unknown: 223

Burials by war
- First World War: 549

Norfolk Cemetery is a Commonwealth War Graves Commission (CWGC) burial ground for the dead of the First World War. It is located at the village of Bécordel-Bécourt, near Albert in the Somme department of France.

== History ==
Located in the village of Bécordel-Bécourt, a short distance due east of Albert, Norfolk Cemetery was started by the 1st Battalion of the Royal Norfolk Regiment in August 1915. When the battalion left, other units that were stationed there continued to inter casualties in the cemetery up until August 1916. In the early stages of the Battle of the Somme, the immediate area was used to site artillery batteries. In the postwar period, a number of surrounding cemeteries were consolidated to Norfolk Cemetery, significantly increasing its size.

== Cemetery ==
Designed by Herbert Baker, the cemetery is sited on the C1 road to Becourt and is laid out substantially as a rectangle surrounded by a low brick wall. The west wall of the cemetery runs along the road. The entrance is on the southwest corner and centrally located along the east wall is a Cross of Sacrifice.

It contains the remains of 549 soldiers of the British Commonwealth, mainly those of the United Kingdom. Of the 326 identified casualties are 318 Britons, six Australians, a Canadian, and an Indian soldier. Many of the soldiers buried in the cemetery were those of the 21st Division who were killed or died of wounds during the opening days of the Battle of the Somme.

A notable interment is Stewart Loudoun-Shand, a soldier in the British Army who was posthumously awarded the Victoria Cross (VC) for his actions on the opening day of the Battle of the Somme. The ashes of another VC recipient, Brett Cloutman who died in 1971, are interred at the cemetery, in the grave of his brother, an officer of No. 178 Tunnelling Company who was killed on 22 August 1915.

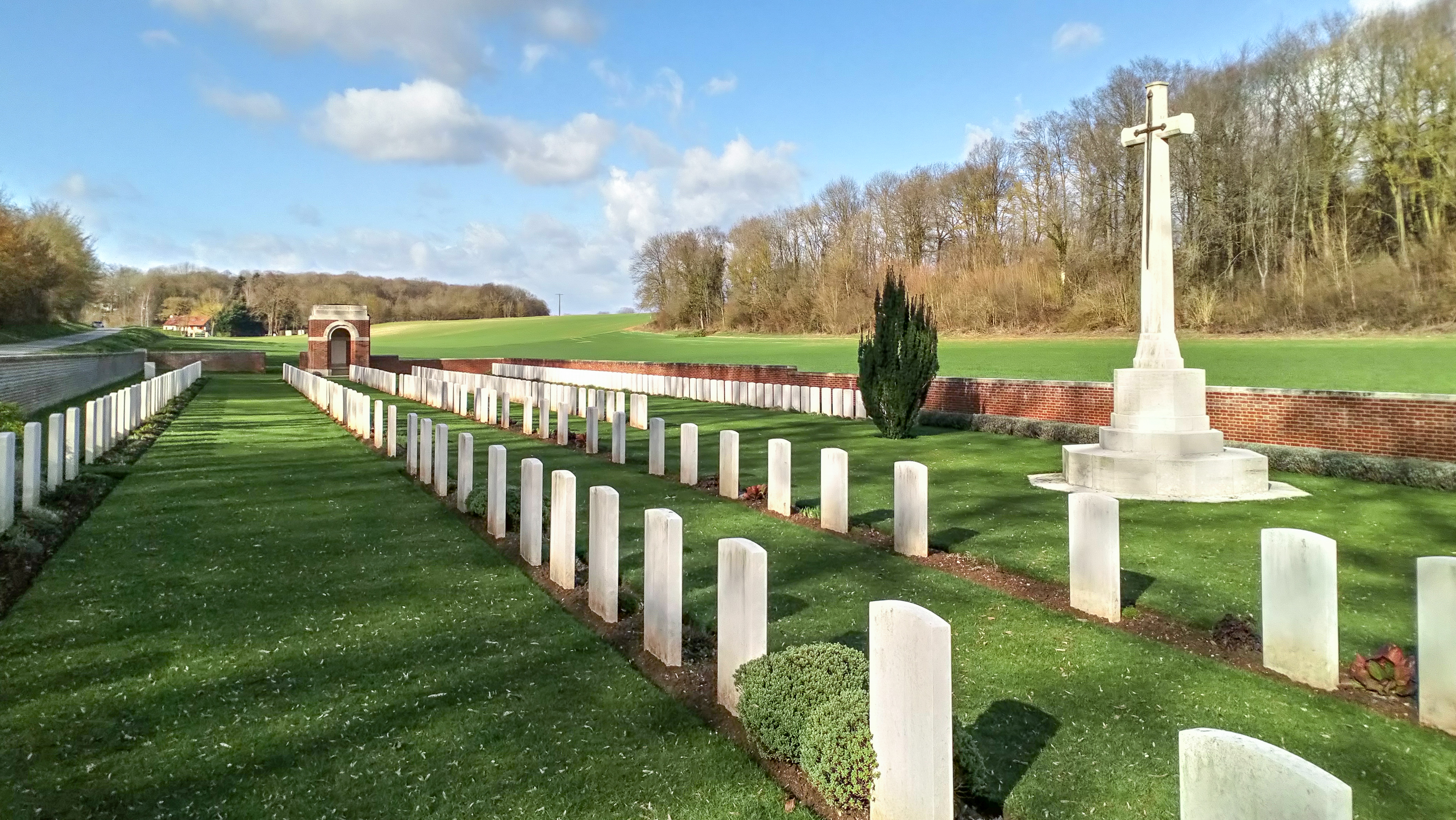
The Cross of Sacrifice at Norfolk Cemetery
