= Gooderstone Warren =

Protected area in Norfolk, England

Coordinates: 52.577°N 0.645°E

- Site of Special Scientific Interest
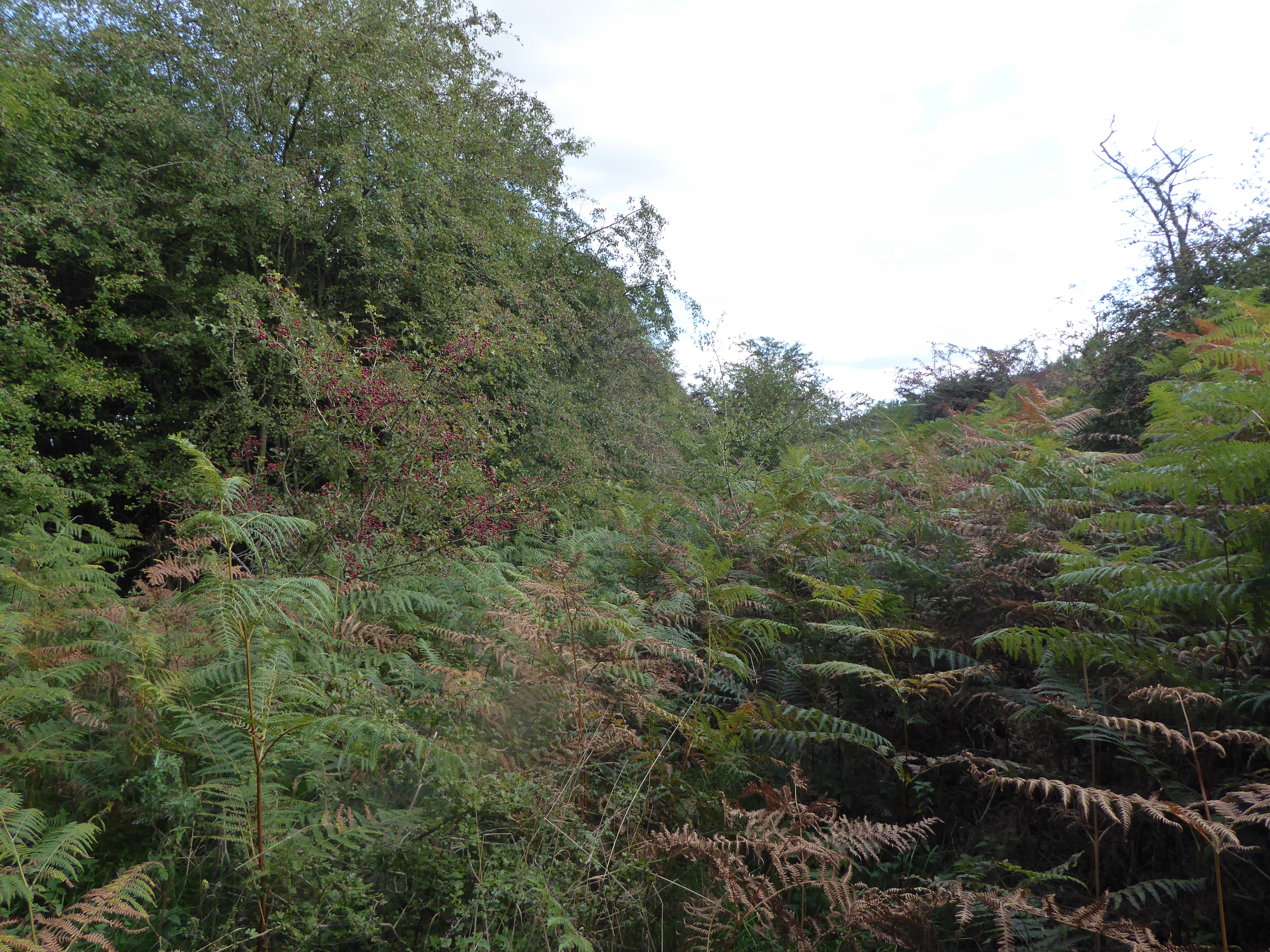
- Location of Gooderstone Warren.
- Area of search: Norfolk, England
- Grid reference: TF 793 010
- Interest: Biological
- Area: 21.6 hectares (53 acres)
- Notification date: 1987
- Location map: Magic Map

Gooderstone Warren is a 21.6-hectare (53-acre) biological Site of Special Scientific Interest south of Cockley Cley in Norfolk, England. It is part of the Breckland Special Area of Conservation and Special Protection Area.

This sandy site has soils which range from acidic to calcareous, resulting in a variety of grassland types. There is a pit at the north end which has flora including cowslips and the uncommon purple milk vetch.

The site is private land with no public access.
