= Cockley Cley =

Village and civil parish in England

Coordinates: 52.60673°N 0.64554°E

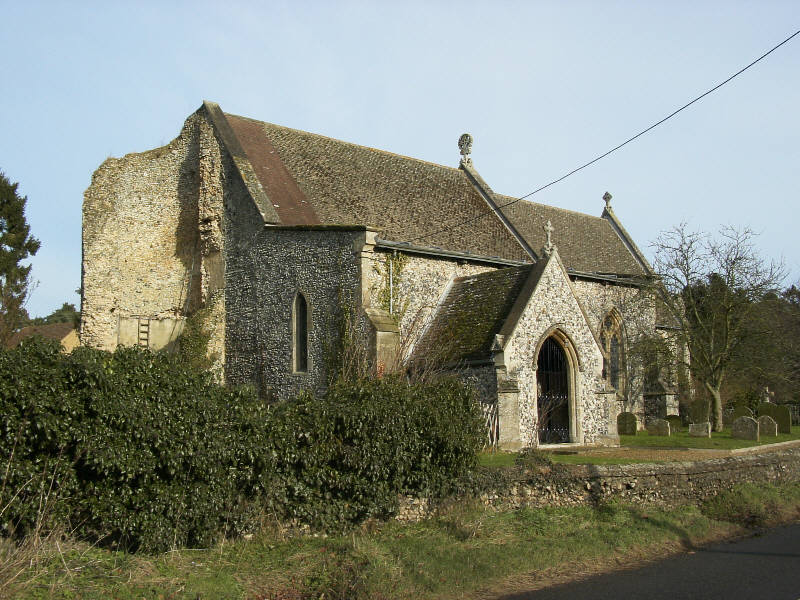
- All Saints' Church

- Location within Norfolk
- Area: 25.52 km^{2} (9.85 sq mi)
- Population: 239 (2021)
  - Density: 9/km^{2} (23/sq mi)
- OS grid reference: TF792042
- Civil parish: Cockley Cley
- District: Breckland
- Shire county: Norfolk
- Region: East
- Country: England
- Sovereign state: United Kingdom
- Post town: SWAFFHAM
- Postcode district: PE37
- Dialling code: 01760
- Police: Norfolk
- Fire: Norfolk
- Ambulance: East of England
- UK Parliament: South West Norfolk

Cockley Cley is a village and civil parish in the English county of Norfolk.

Cockley Cley is located 3.2 miles (5.1 km) south-west of Swaffham and 27 miles (43 km) west of Norwich.

== History ==
The village's name is first recorded in 1086 simply as Cleia (also Claia) meaning "clay, clayey soil". "Cockley" first appears in the placename in 1324 when the village is recorded as Cocklikleye, and the origin of this element is less clear. It may derive from the Old English for "hill shrouded in trees". Alternatively, "Cockley" may derive from Middle English cocklayk "place where cocks display to attract a mate", from Old English *cocca-lēah "cocks' wood", or be a manorial affix from a rare family name possibly originating in the West Riding of Yorkshire or Suffolk.

In the Domesday Book, Cockley Cley is recorded as a settlement of 32 households located in the hundred of South Greenhoe. In 1086, the village was divided between the estates of King William I and William de Warenne.

Cockley Cley is the site of significant defensive infrastructure built during the Second World War, including two rare examples of the "Allan Williams Turret" designed to mount a Lewis gun in an anti-aircraft role.

In August 1974, a decapitated corpse of a woman was discovered near the village. As of 2023, the woman has not been identified.

Between 1975 and 2004, Cockley Cley was home to a reconstructed Iceni village visitor attraction. The site reopened briefly in 2014 as the Iceni Centre but was subsequently forced to close due to dwindling customer numbers.

== Geography ==
According to the 2021 census, Cockley Cley has a population of 239 people which shows a slight increase from the 232 people recorded in the 2011 census.

The River Gadder rises close to Cockley Cley.

== All Saints' Church ==
Cockley Cley's Church of England parish church is one of Norfolk's 124 existing round-tower churches but the church tower largely collapsed on 29 August 1991 and has not been re-built. All Saints' is located on Swaffham Road and has been Grade II* listed since 1960. The church was restored in 1866–88 by diocesan architect Richard Phipson. The north arcade is 14th century, and it has been copied for the south arcade.

== Governance ==
Cockley Cley is part of the electoral ward of Bedingfield for local elections and is part of the district of Breckland.

The village's national constituency is South West Norfolk which has been represented by Labour's Terry Jermy since 2024.

== War memorial ==
Cockley Cley's war memorial is a marble plaque located inside All Saints' Church which lists the following names for the First World War:

Rank	Name	Unit	Date of death	Burial
Cpl.	William B. Root	8th Bn., Norfolk Regiment	21 Jul. 1916	Thiepval Memorial
Cpl.	Frederick Atter	9th Bn., Norfolk Regt.	19 May 1917	Barlin Cemetery
LCpl.	Frederick C. Barker	1st Bn., Essex Regiment	1 Nov. 1915	Alexandria War Cemetery
LCpl.	Wallace G. DeRungary	1st Bn., Norfolk Regiment	1 Sep. 1918	Achiet-le-Grand Cemetery
Pte.	Edward C. Pedgrift	8th Bn., Norfolk Regt.	4 Jun. 1915	St Lawrence's Churchyard
Pte.	Charles R. Wilding	8th Bn., Norfolk Regt.	5 Dec. 1915	Norfolk Cemetery

And, Frederick Diaper and Henry W. T. Norman as well as the following for the Second World War:

Rank	Name	Unit	Date of death	Burial
Mne.	Sydney A. Holman	H.M. Landing Craft (Flak) L14	24 May 1944	Chatham Naval Memorial
Pte.	Russell K. Pigg	2nd Bn., Royal Norfolk Regiment	26 May 1940	Mont-Bernanchon Cemetery

== Gallery ==
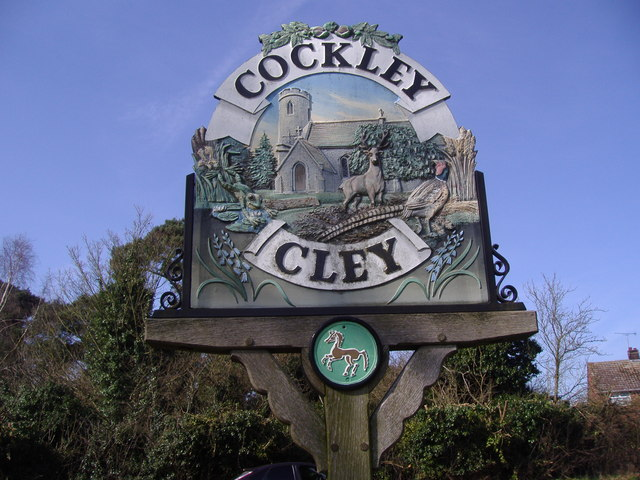
Cockley Cley village sign, showing the church still with its tower

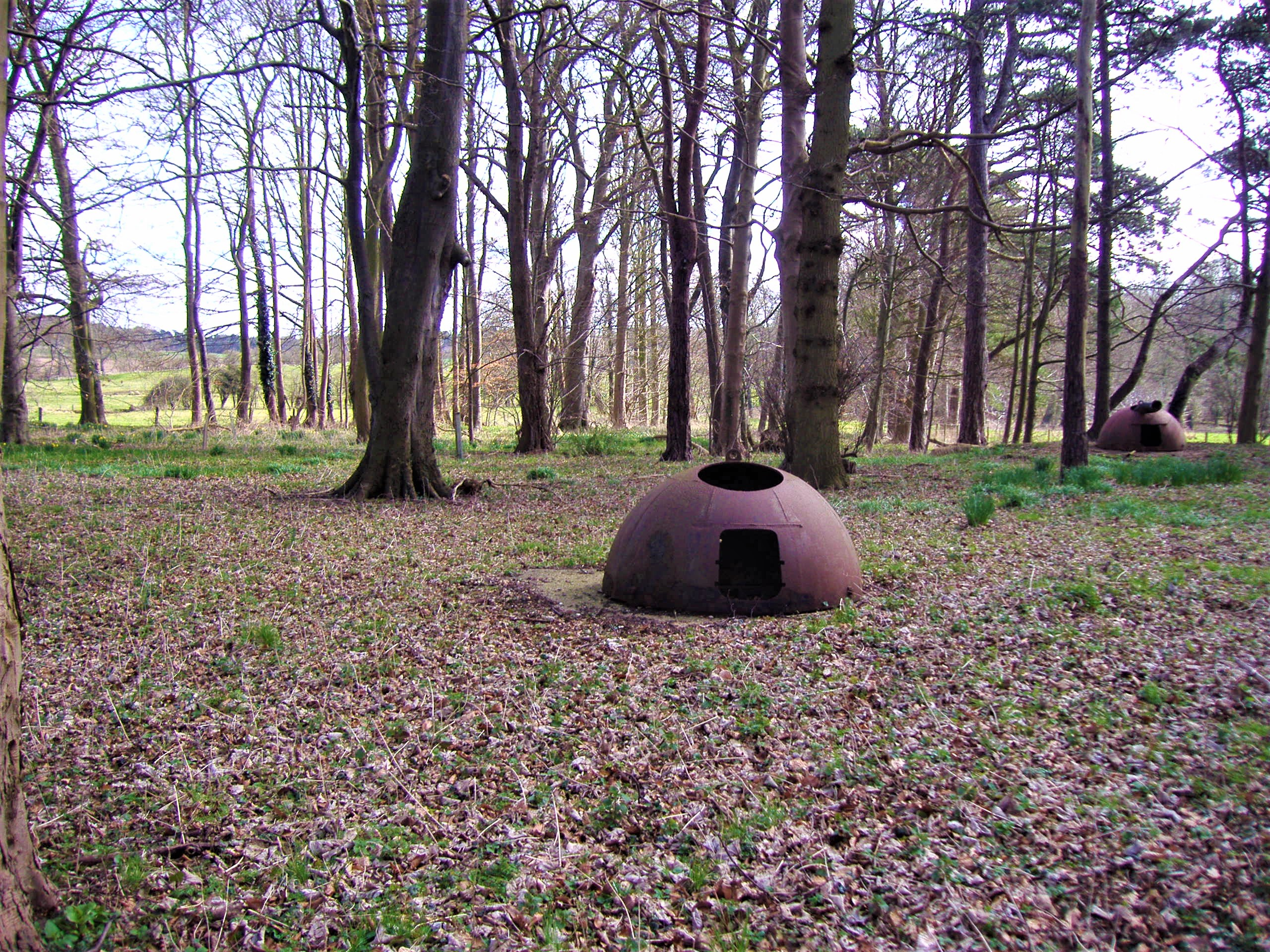
Rare Allan Williams Turret fortifications of the Second World War in Cockley Cley

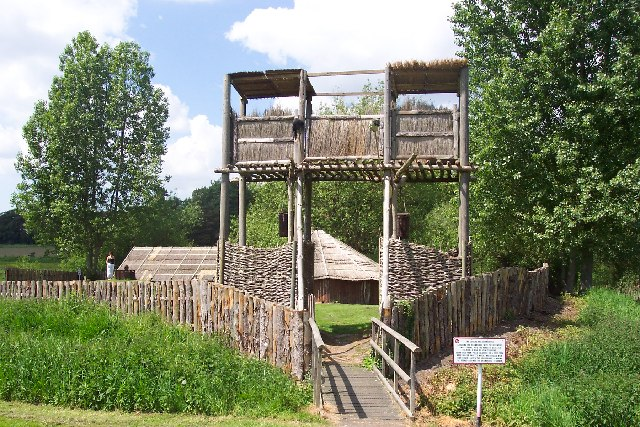
Entrance to the reconstruction of an Iceni village, now closed
