= William Rowan =

British Army officer (1789–1879)

Field Marshal Sir William Rowan GCB
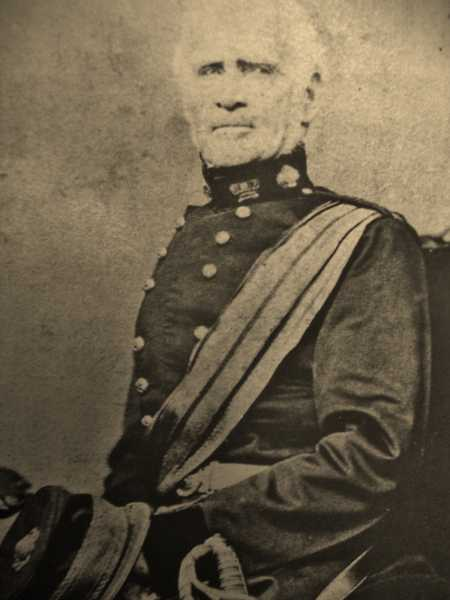
- Born: 18 June 1789; Isle of Man
- Died: 26 September 1879 (aged 90); Bath, Somerset
- Military career
- Allegiance: United Kingdom
- Branch: British Army
- Rank: Field Marshal
- Commands: British troops in Canada
- Conflicts: Napoleonic Wars
- Awards: Knight Grand Cross of the Order of the Bath

Field Marshal Sir William Shearman Rowan, GCB (18 June 1789 – 26 September 1879) was a British Army officer. He served in the Peninsular War and then the Hundred Days, fighting at the Battle of Waterloo and taking part in an important charge led by Sir John Colborne against the Imperial Guard when he was wounded. He later assisted Colborne in Colborne's new role as Acting Governor General of British North America during the rebellions by the Patriote movement in 1837. Rowan returned to Canada as Commander-in-Chief, North America in which role he made an important conciliatory speech in response to the burning of the Parliament Buildings in Montreal by an angry mob in April 1849.

== Life ==
=== Early life ===
He was the son of Robert Rowan of Mullans, County Antrim and Elizabeth Rowan (née Wilson), Rowan was the younger brother of Sir Charles Rowan (c.1782–1852), Commissioner of the Metropolitan Police in London, and formerly an officer of the 52nd Light Infantry, a regiment in which their brother Robert and their father's brother Charles were also officers.

=== Military career ===
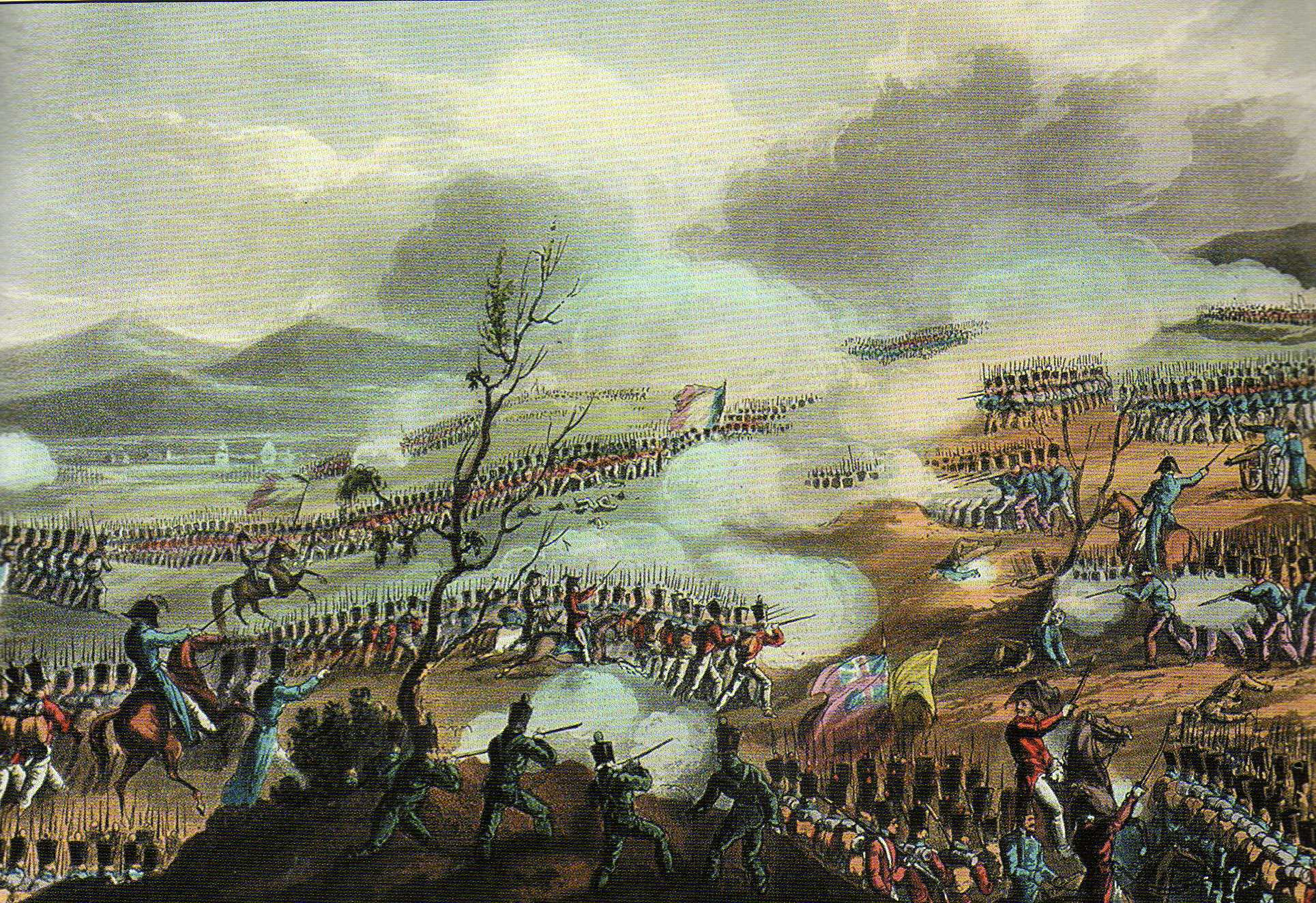
The Battle of Nivelle where the 52nd Light Infantry played an important part in the victory.

At the age of 14 years, Rowan was commissioned as an ensign in the 52nd Light Infantry on 4 November 1803 and promoted to lieutenant on 15 June 1804. He was deployed to Sicily in 1806 and to Sweden in 1808 before being promoted to captain and being given command of a company in the 2nd Battalion of his regiment on 19 October 1808.

==== Peninsular war and Walcheren ====
During the Peninsular War he fought in Spain under General Robert Craufurd: although heavily engaged providing covering fire for Sir John Moore's famous retreat, he was not present at the Battle of Corunna in January 1809, having been detached to Vigo, from where he returned to England.

He was present at the capture of Flushing in August 1809 during the disastrous Walcheren Campaign. After returning to Spain, he was present at the Battle of Sabugal in April 1811, the Battle of Vitoria in June 1813, the Battle of the Pyrenees in July 1813 and the Battle of the Bidassoa in October 1813 as well as the Battle of Nivelle in November 1813, the Battle of the Nive in December 1813, the Battle of Orthez in February 1814 and, having been promoted to brevet major on 3 March 1814, he also fought at the Battle of Toulouse in April 1814.

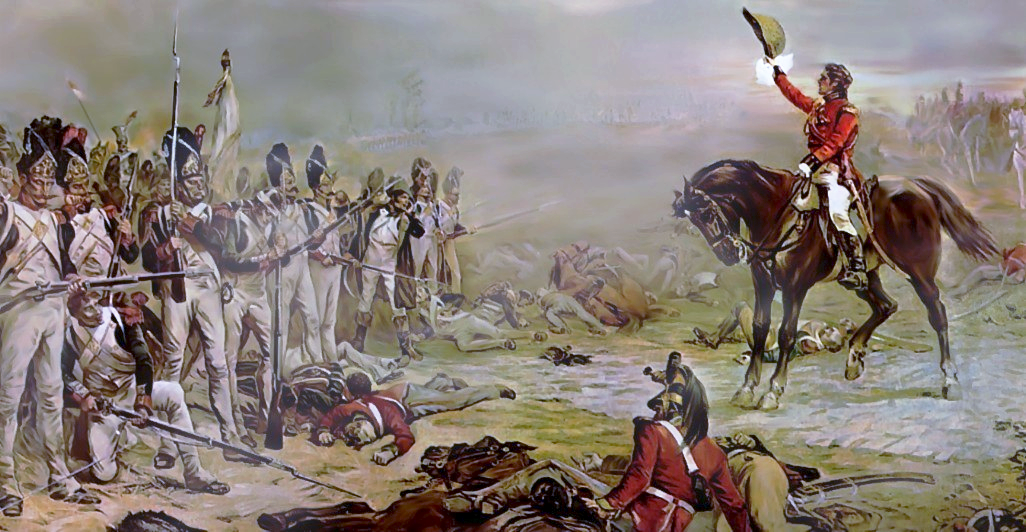
Waterloo - General Hill invites the last survivors of the French Imperial Guard to surrender.

Rowan's promotion to brevet major was directly in recognition of his personal bravery and the success of his command in the fighting in the marsh which actually decided the Battle of Orthez in Wellington's favour.

==== Waterloo ====
During the Hundred Days Rowan fought at the Battle of Waterloo in June 1815, taking part in an important charge led by Sir John Colborne against the Imperial Guard, during which he was wounded in action and 150 of his men were killed or wounded. After the War he served in the Army of Occupation of France and was put in charge of the 1st arrondissement of Paris.

==== Canada ====
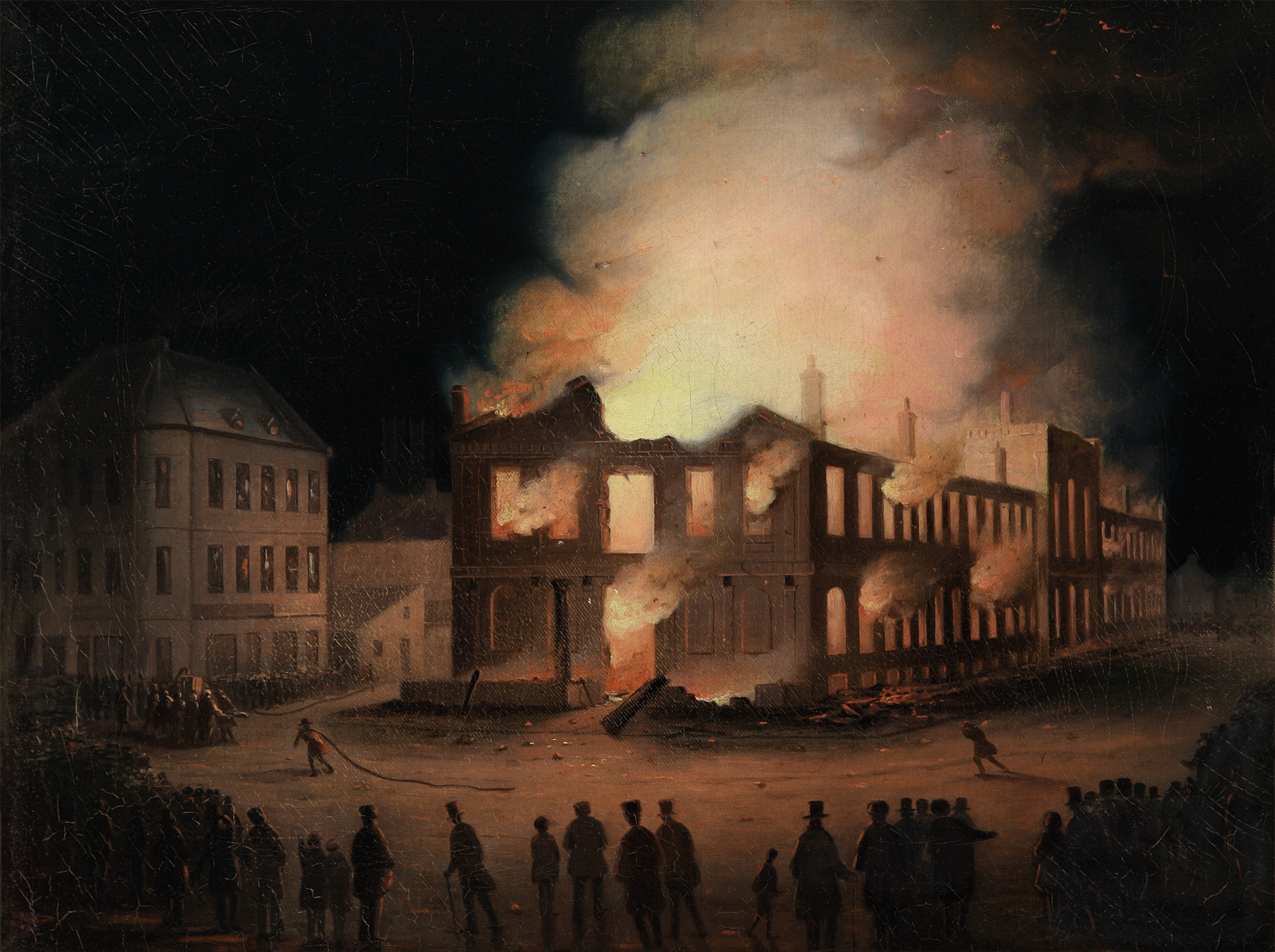
The burning of the Parliament Buildings in Montreal

Promoted to brevet lieutenant colonel on 21 January 1819, Rowan was posted with his regiment to New Brunswick in 1823 before being promoted to the substantive rank of major on 4 May 1826. He transferred to the 58th Regiment of Foot on 27 July 1826 and, having been promoted to the substantive rank of lieutenant colonel on 22 July 1830, he became Military and Civil Secretary to Sir John Colborne, Lieutenant Governor of Upper Canada, in 1832. He was promoted to colonel on 10 January 1837 and assisted Colborne in Colborne's new role as Acting Governor General of British North America during the rebellions by the Patriote movement in 1837. Rowan was appointed a Companion of the Order of the Bath on 19 July 1838 before returning to England in 1839.

Promoted to major-general on 9 November 1846, Rowan returned to Canada as Commander-in-Chief, North America in Spring 1849. In this role he made an important conciliatory speech in response to the burning of the Parliament Buildings in Montreal by an angry mob in April 1849. Rowan was promoted to the local rank of lieutenant general on 22 June 1849.

=== Later life ===
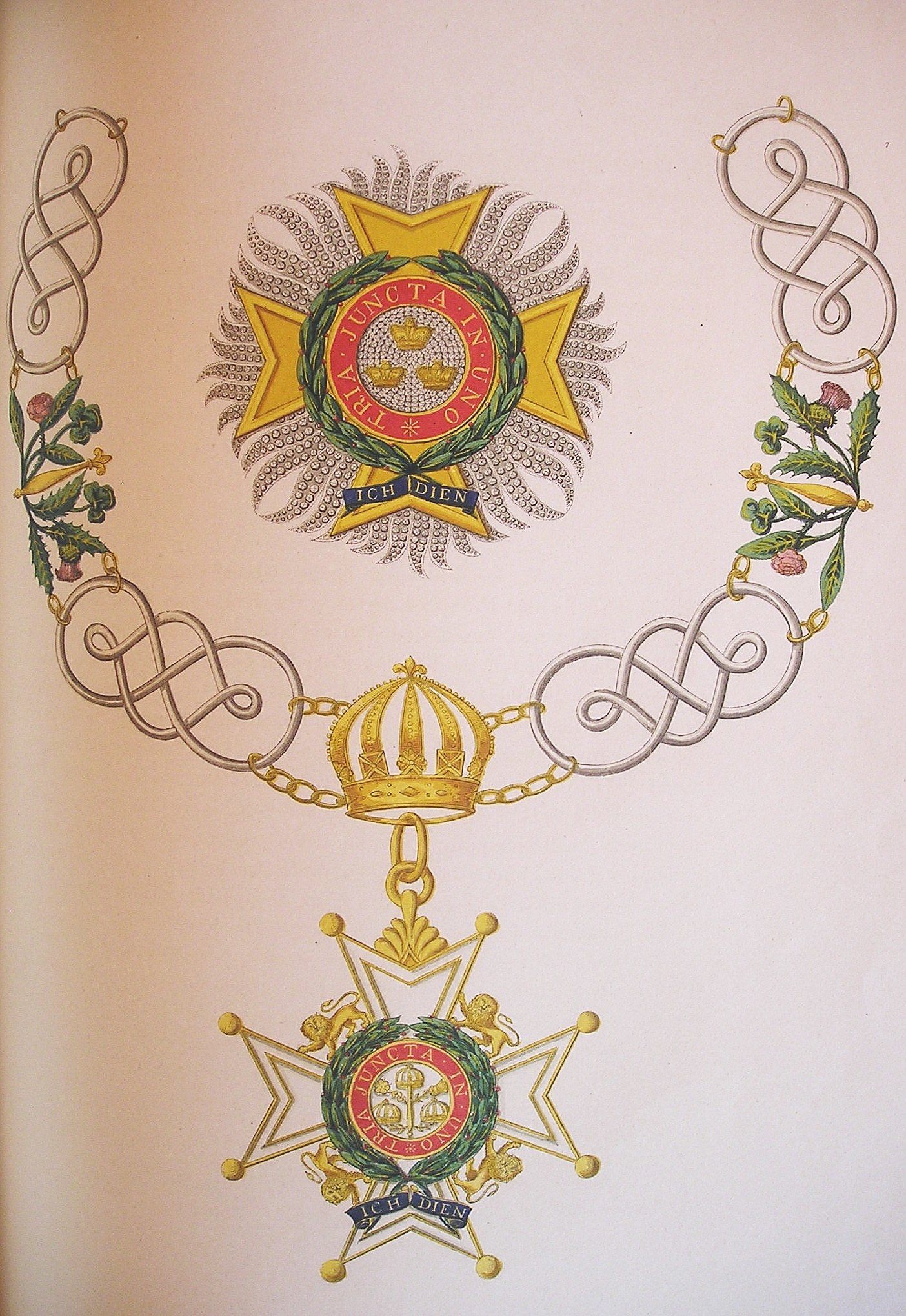
Insignia of the GCB as awarded to William Rowan.

Promoted to substantive rank of lieutenant-general on 20 January 1854, Rowan returned to England in 1855 and retired to a house in Gay Street, Bath. He was advanced to Knight Commander of the Order of the Bath on 5 February 1856.

Rowan was also colonel of the 19th Regiment of Foot and later of the 52nd Light Infantry. He was promoted to full general on 13 August 1862 and, having been advanced to Knight Grand Cross of the Order of the Bath on 28 March 1865, he was promoted to field marshal on 2 June 1877. He died on 26 September 1879 at No. 9 Gay Street, Bath and was buried at Lansdown Cemetery in Bath.

== Family ==
Rowan married Martha Spong of Aylesford, Kent, daughter of John and Rosamond Spong on 21 January 1811 at West Malling in Kent; they had no children. From at least 1860 he resided with his wife, a Chelsea Pensioner man-servant (James Wise) and household staff at No. 9 Gay Street, Bath.

== Awards ==
- Knight Grand Cross of the Order of the Bath 1838,
- Waterloo Medal 1815.
- Military General Service Medal 1848 with clasps Vittoria, Pyrenees, Nivelle, Nive, Orthes and Toulouse.

== Sources ==
- Heathcote, Tony (1999). The British Field Marshals, 1736–1997: A Biographical Dictionary. Barnsley: Leo Cooper. ISBN 0-85052-696-5.

Military offices
Preceded by Sir Benjamin D'Urban	Commander-in-Chief, North America; 1849–1855	Succeeded by Sir William Eyre
Preceded by Sir Archibald Maclaine	Colonel of the 52nd (Oxfordshire) Regiment of Foot; 1861–1879	Succeeded by John Leslie Dennis
Preceded by Charles Turner	Colonel of the 19th (The 1st Yorkshire North Riding) Regiment of Foot; 1854–1861	Succeeded by Sir Abraham Josias Cloëté
