= Brett Cloutman =

Recipient of the Victoria Cross

Sir Brett Mackay Cloutman
- Born: 7 November 1881; Muswell Hill, London
- Died: 15 August 1971 (aged 89); Highgate, London
- Burial place: Golders Green Crematorium
- Military career
- Allegiance: United Kingdom
- Branch: British Army
- Rank: Lieutenant-Colonel
- Units: 12th London Regiment (Rangers); Royal Engineers
- Conflicts: World War I World War II
- Awards: Victoria Cross; Military Cross
- Other work: Barrister

Lieutenant-Colonel His Honour Sir Brett Mackay Cloutman, VC, MC, QC (7 November 1881 – 15 August 1971) was a British Army officer, barrister, and Official Referee of the Supreme Court. He was awarded the Victoria Cross, the highest and most prestigious award for gallantry in the face of the enemy that can be awarded to British and Commonwealth forces.

== Background ==
Brett Cloutman was educated at Berkhamsted School, Bishop's Stortford College and London University where he was a member of the Royal Engineers contingent of the university's Officers' Training Corps.

== Military career ==
At the outbreak of World War I Cloutman enlisted as a Rifleman in the Rangers (12th Battalion, London Regiment), reached the rank of Lance-Corporal, and in 1915 was commissioned as a second lieutenant in the Kent (Fortress) Engineers, a Territorial Force unit.

=== Military Cross ===
Cloutman, by then Acting Major in command of the 59th Field Company, Royal Engineers, was awarded the Military Cross for an action in September 1918:

For conspicuous gallantly and devotion to duty at Banteux on the morning of 30th September, 1918, when he made a personal reconnaissance under heavy machine-gun fire to ascertain the possibilities of bridging the Canal de L'Escaut.

=== Victoria Cross ===
A few weeks later the action took place for which Cloutman won his VC. The official citation read:

For most conspicuous bravery on the 6th November, 1918, at Pont-sur-Sambre. Maj. Cloutman, after reconnoitring the river crossings, found the Quartes Bridge almost intact but prepared for demolition. Leaving his party under cover he went forward alone, swam across the river, and, having cut the "leads" from the charges, returned the same way, despite the fact that the bridge and all approaches thereto were swept by enemy shells and machine-gun fire at close range. Although the bridge was blown up later in the day by other means, the abutments remained intact.

The bridge had been prepared for demolition by the Germans, and was well defended. By cutting the wires, Cloutman prevented the enemy from blowing it up at the time. He was seen at the bridge, however, and escaped under an intense fire from its guards. The fact that the abutments were not destroyed later meant that the bridge could be more quickly replaced by the Allies.

This was the last act to win a VC in the First World War.

== Legal career ==
After the war Cloutman became a lawyer and was called to the Bar at Gray's Inn in 1926. In World War II he served again in the Royal Engineers and received a mention in despatches. He became a King's Counsel in 1946 and in 1947 he was appointed Senior Chairman of the War Pensions Tribunal. He was Senior Official Referee of the Supreme Court of Judicature (now the Senior Courts of England and Wales) 1954–63. Having become Senior Official Referee, he was knighted in the Queen's Birthday Honours of 1957. He was Master of the Worshipful Company of Glass Sellers 1939–40 and 1965–66.

Following his death in 1971, his ashes were interred at Norfolk Cemetery, in the Somme department, in the grave of his brother, an officer of No. 178 Tunnelling Company who was killed on 22 August 1915.

His Victoria Cross is displayed at the Royal Engineers Museum, Chatham, Kent.

== Publications ==
- The Law relating to authors and publishers (with Francis Luck), J. Bale, Sons & Danielsson, Ltd, London, 1927
- Law for printers and publishers (with Francis Luck), London, J. Bale, Sons & Danielsson, Ltd, 1929; 2nd edition, Staples Press, London, 1949

== Sources ==
- CLOUTMAN, His Honour Sir Brett, Who Was Who, A & C Black, 1920–2008; online edn, Oxford University Press, Dec 2007
- Monuments to Courage (David Harvey, 1999)
- The Register of the Victoria Cross (This England, 1997)
- The Sapper VCs (Gerald Napier, 1998)
- Gliddon, Gerald (2014) [2000]. The Final Days 1918. VCs of the First World War. Stroud, Gloucestershire: The History Press. ISBN 978-0-7509-5368-9.
- Gliddon, Gerald (2009) [1987]. Somme 1916: A Battlefield Companion. Stroud, Gloucestershire, United Kingdom: The History Press. ISBN 978-0-7524-5335-4.
