= Green Howards =

The Green Howards (Alexandra, Princess of Wales's Own Yorkshire Regiment; 19th Regiment of Foot)
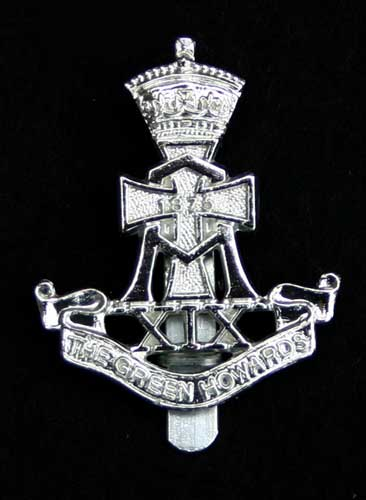
- Green Howards cap badge
- Active: 20 November 1688 – 6 June 2006
- Country: Kingdom of England (1688–1707); Kingdom of Great Britain (1707–1800); United Kingdom (1801–2006)
- Branch: British Army
- Type: Line infantry
- Role: Light infantry
- Size: One battalion
- Garrison/HQ: Richmond Barracks, North Yorkshire
- Colors: Green Facings
- March: Quick – The Bonnie English Rose; Slow – Maria Theresa
- Anniversaries: Alma (20 September)

Commanders
- Last Colonel in Chief: King Harald V of Norway
- Last Colonel: Field Marshal Peter Inge KG, GCB, PC, DL

Insignia
- Tactical Recognition Flash

The Green Howards (Alexandra, Princess of Wales's Own Yorkshire Regiment), frequently known as the Yorkshire Regiment until the 1920s, was a line infantry regiment of the British Army, in the King's Division. Raised in 1688, it served under various titles until it was amalgamated with the Prince of Wales's Own Regiment of Yorkshire and the Duke of Wellington's Regiment (West Riding), all Yorkshire-based regiments in the King's Division, to form the Yorkshire Regiment (14th/15th, 19th and 33rd/76th Foot) on 6 June 2006.

== History ==
=== Formation to end 18th century ===
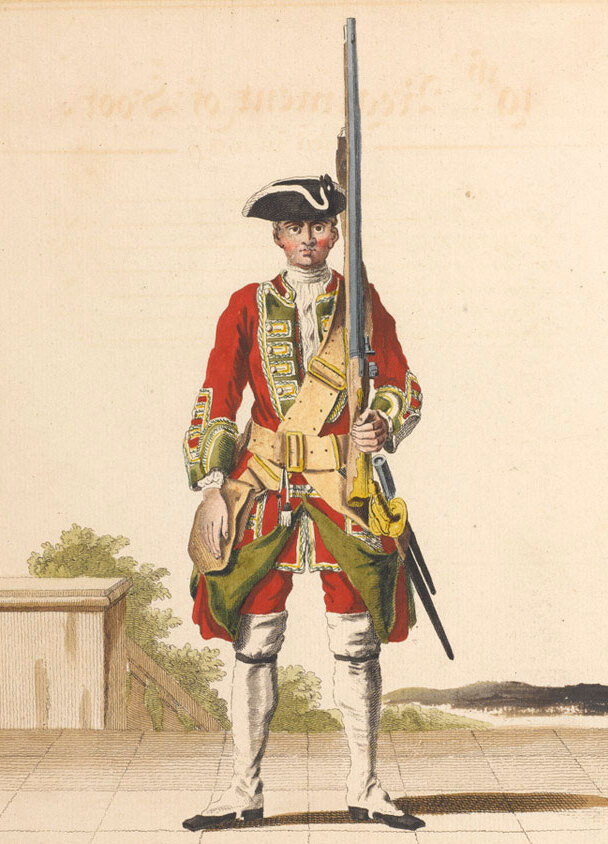
c. 1742 engraving of a regimental private

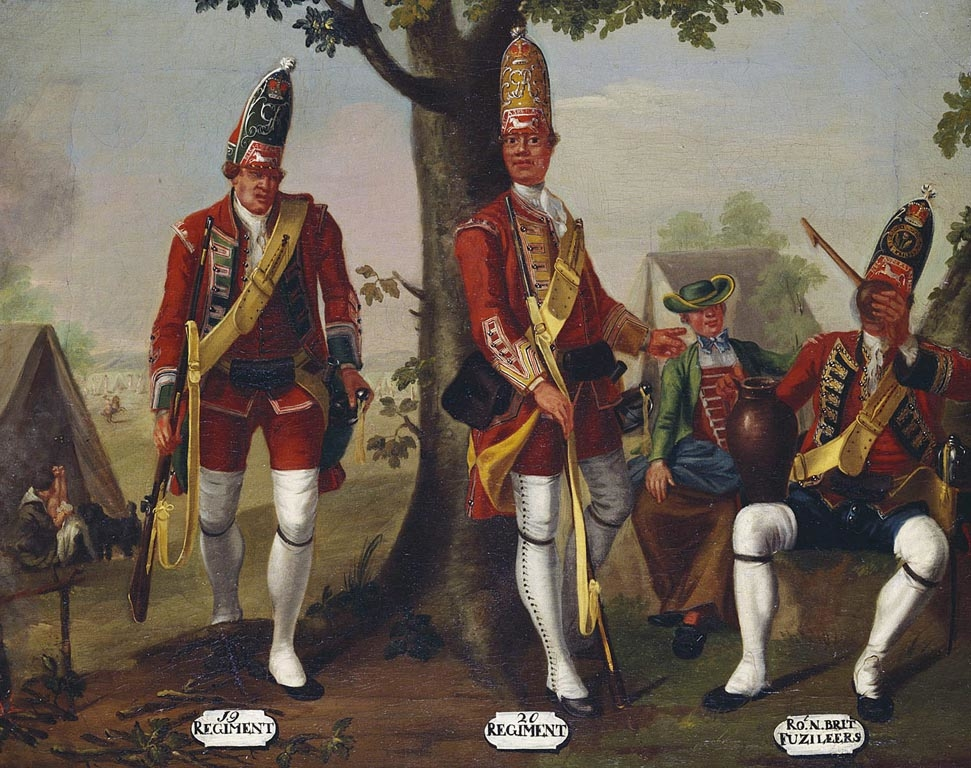
c. 1751 painting of a regimental grenadier (left)

The regiment was formed during the 1688 Glorious Revolution from independent companies raised in Somerset by Colonel Francis Luttrell, to support William III. In 1690, it supplied detachments for Ireland and Jamaica, incurring heavy losses from disease, including Luttrell who was replaced by Thomas Erle. Transferred to Flanders in early 1692 during the Nine Years' War, it was present at the battles of Steenkerque and Landen, as well as the Siege of Namur. after the 1697 Peace of Ryswick, it escaped disbandment by being made part of the Irish garrison, where it remained until the War of the Spanish Succession began in 1702.

In 1703, it was part of an expeditionary force in the West Indies and Newfoundland, losing many men to disease before returning to Ireland in 1704. Back in Flanders in 1710, it took part in the sieges of Douai and Bouchain and when the war ended in 1713, it resumed garrison duties in Ireland. With the exception of the 1719 Vigo expedition, it did not see action again until 1744.

When the War of the Austrian Succession began in 1740, the regiment was based in Edinburgh; by 1744, many of its men were Scots and recruiting officers warned to exclude 'Jacobites and Irish Papists.' The unit was then commanded by Charles Howard and thus known as 'Howard's Regiment'; when it joined the army in Flanders, this clashed with another regiment also commanded by a Howard. To avoid confusion, they were referred to by the colour of their facings, one becoming 'Green Howards' and the other, 'Buff Howards'.

The Green Howards fought at the Battle of Fontenoy in May 1745, with a short period in England during the 1745 Jacobite Rising. It took part in the Battle of Rocoux and the Battle of Lauffeld before the 1748 Treaty of Aix-la-Chapelle ended the war, after which it became part of the garrison of Gibraltar. While there, the 1751 army reforms retitled it the 19th Regiment of Foot. It returned to Britain in 1752 and spent most of the next decade on garrison duty in Scotland and Northern England.

During the 1756 to 1763 Seven Years' War, it took part in the capture of Belle Île in April 1761, where it suffered over 200 casualties. Officer recruitment was challenging as the cost of purchasing a commission in the 19th Foot was very high. This led to severe shortages in middling and senior ranks, with a total of 15 officer positions vacant during the assault on Belle Île including five captains and the regimental major. When peace was declared the regiment was reassigned to garrison duty in Gibraltar and Scotland. Its next active service was not until 1781 when it took part in a disastrous southern campaign in the closing stages of the American Revolutionary War. In 1782, all foot regiments without a special designation were given a county title "to cultivate a connection with the County which might at all times be useful towards recruiting" and so the regiment was redesignated the 19th (1st North Riding of Yorkshire) Regiment.

With the end of the American War, the regiment was stationed in Jamaica, a notoriously unhealthy posting where it was common for units to lose 100% of their strength every two years. It remained there until 1791, when it returned to Britain; in 1796, it was posted to India, the also saw action at the Siege of Seringapatam in April 1799 during the Fourth Anglo-Mysore War.

=== The Two Howards ===
The regiment was known as the Green Howards from 1744. At that time, regiments were known by the name of their colonel. The 19th regiment's colonel was Hon. Sir Charles Howard. However, at the same time, the 3rd Regiment of Foot had been commanded by its colonel Thomas Howard, since 1737. To tell them apart (since they both would have been known as 'Howard's Regiment of Foot'), the colours of their uniform facings were used to distinguish them. In this way, one became 'Howard's Buffs' (eventually simply The Buffs), while the other became the Green Howards. Although the Green Howards were referred to unofficially as such from then on, it was not until 1921 that the regiment was officially retitled as the Green Howards (Alexandra, Princess of Wales's Own Yorkshire Regiment). Under the Childers Reforms, all non-royal English infantry regiments were to wear white facings from 1881. In 1899, the regiment was able to reverse this decision with the restoration of the grass green facings formerly worn by the 19th Foot.

=== Kandyan Wars ===
In April 1801 the regiment was deployed to Ceylon for service in the Kandyan Wars. The regiment lost six officers and 172 other ranks in a massacre there in June 1803 and then remained on the island to enforce British rule. The regiment did not return to England until May 1820.

=== Victorian era ===
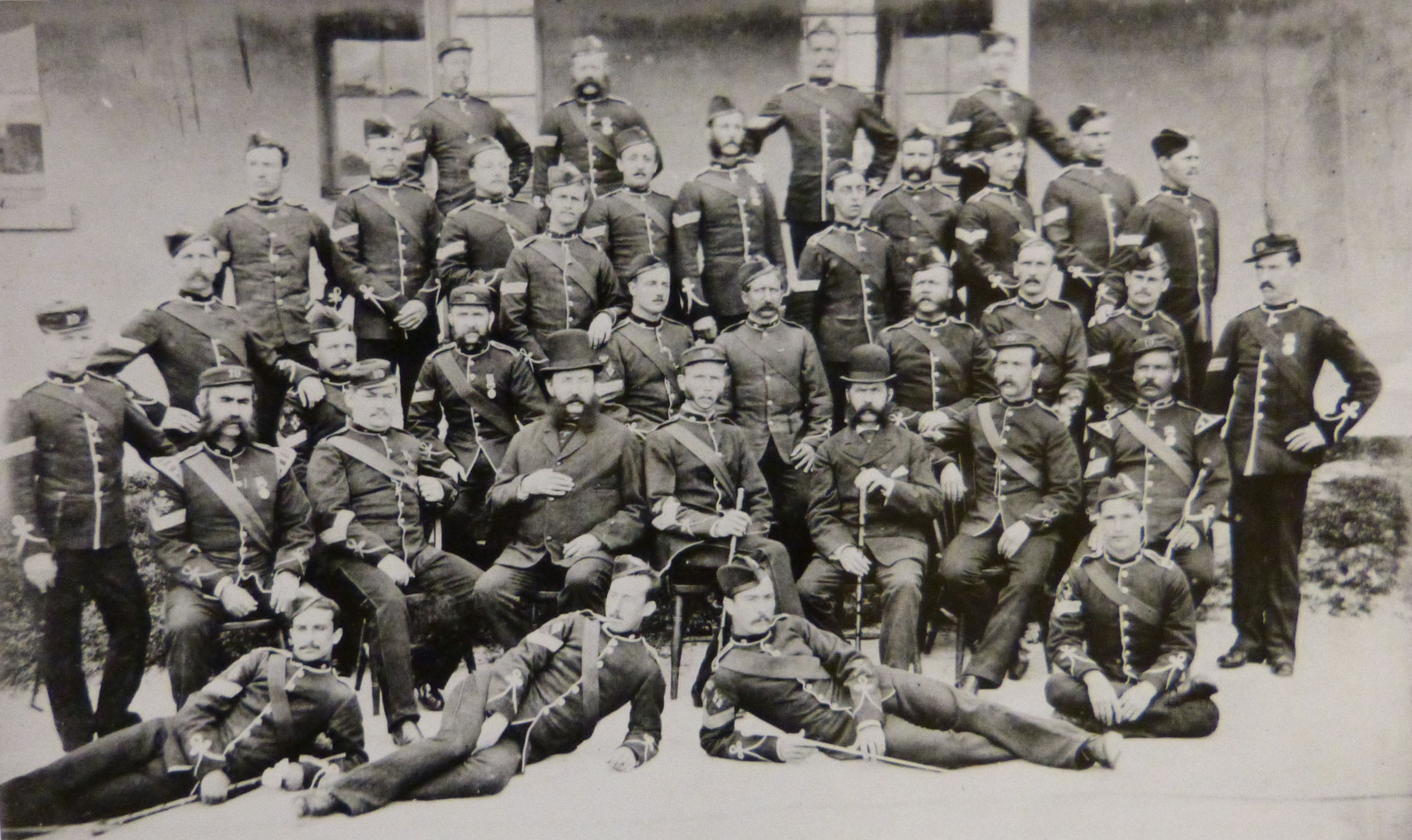
Warrant officers and non-commissioned officers of the 1st Battalion, 19th (1st Yorkshire North Riding – Princess of Wales's Own) Regiment of Foot, in the imperial fortress colony of Bermuda, December 1879.

The regiment saw action at the Battle of Alma in September 1854 and at the Siege of Sevastopol in winter 1854 during the Crimean War and then saw action again during the Indian Rebellion. In 1875, Princess Alexandra, Princess of Wales presented new colours to the 1st Battalion at Sheffield, and consented to the regiment bearing her name, thus becoming the 19th (1st Yorkshire North Riding – Princess of Wales's Own) Regiment of Foot. The regiment adopted a cap badge consisting of the Princess's cypher "A" combined with the Dannebrog or Danish cross and topped by her coronet. The Princess became Queen Alexandra in 1901, and was the regiment's colonel-in-chief from 1914 until her death in 1925.

=== Childers Reforms ===
The regiment was not fundamentally affected by the Cardwell Reforms of the 1870s, which gave it a depot at Richmond Barracks in North Yorkshire from 1873, or by the Childers Reforms of 1881 – as it already possessed two battalions, there was no need for it to amalgamate with another regiment. Under the reforms the regiment amalgamated with the militia battalions and rifle volunteers in its designated regimental district and became The Princess of Wales's Own (Yorkshire Regiment) on 1 July 1881.

The 1st battalion was stationed at Nova Scotia from 1884, moved to the Mediterranean in 1888 where it was stationed at Malta but also saw action in Egypt, then moved to Jersey in 1895 followed by Ireland in 1898. After a brief spell in Gibraltar in 1899, the battalion was posted to South Africa as reinforcement for the Second Boer War, where it was involved in the Relief of Kimberley and the battles of Diamond Hill (June 1900) and Belfast (August 1900). The battalion returned to the United Kingdom in September 1902. The 2nd battalion was in Ireland from 1881 to 1886, when it returned to garrison back home in England. From early 1890 the battalion was stationed in British India, where it took part in military campaigns on the North-West Frontier. The battalion had various postings, including at Sitapur and Benares until late 1902 when it was posted to Cawnpore.

Officers and men of the mounted infantry company of the Green Howards photographed in South Africa in 1901.

A 3rd (Militia) Battalion, formed from the 5th West York Militia in 1881 was a reserve battalion. It was embodied in December 1899, and 700 men embarked on the SS Assaye in February 1900 for service in South Africa during the Second Boer War. Many of the officers and men returned home in May 1902 on the SS Sicilia. The 4th (Militia) Battalion, formed from the North York Rifles in 1881 was also a reserve battalion. It was embodied for service on 5 May 1900, disembodied on 2 July 1901, and re-embodied again for service during Second Boer War in South Africa. 555 officers and men returned to Southampton by the SS Tagus in October 1902, following the end of the war, and was disbanded at the Richmond barracks.

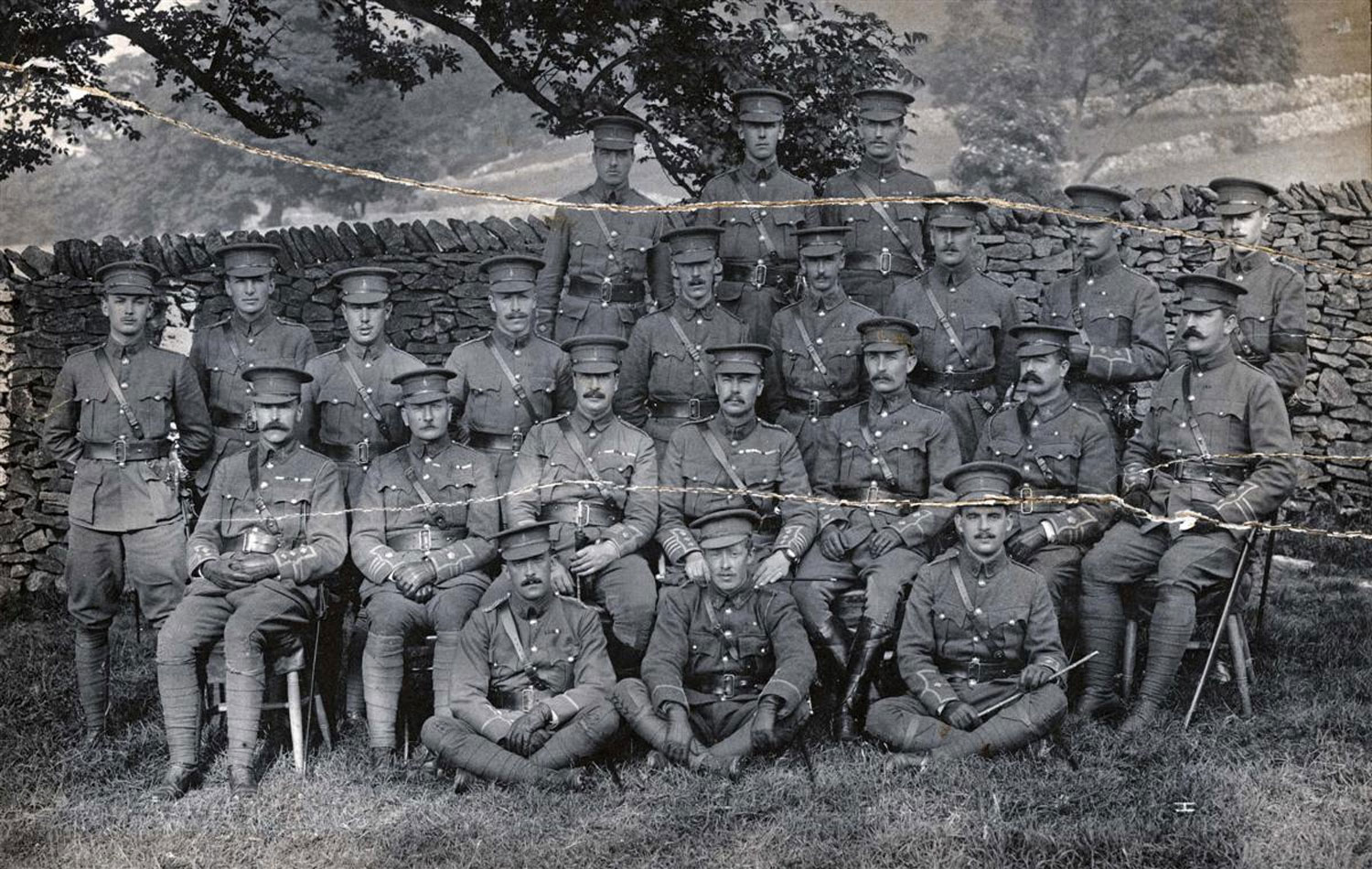
Officers of the 1st Battalion, Yorkshire Regiment, at a training camp in Castleton, Derbyshire, July 1904. Seated in the centre of the second row is Lieutenant Colonel Granville Egerton, the battalion's commander.

In July 1902, the regiment was redesignated as Alexandra, Princess of Wales's Own (Yorkshire Regiment). In 1908, the Volunteers and Militia were reorganised nationally, with the former becoming the Territorial Force and the latter the Special Reserve; the regiment now had one Reserve and two Territorial battalions.

=== First World War ===
==== Regular Army ====
Men of the Yorkshire Regiment (Green Howards) cleaning their rifles after coming out of the line, 3 August 1917.

The 1st Battalion remained in India as part of the 2nd (Sialkot) Cavalry Brigade in the 2nd (Rawalpindi) Division throughout the war and then took part in the Third Anglo-Afghan War in 1919.

The 2nd Battalion landed at Zeebrugge as part of the 21st Brigade in the 7th Division in October 1914 for service on the Western Front. The 2nd Battalion held the Menin crossroads for 16 days during the First Battle of Ypres in October 1914 sustaining heavy casualties.

==== Territorial Force ====
The 1/4th and 1/5th Battalions landed at Boulogne-sur-Mer as part of the York and Durham Brigade in the Northumbrian Division in April 1915 for service on the Western Front. Both battalions saw action at the Second Battle of Ypres in April 1915.

==== New Armies ====
The 6th (Service) Battalion landed at Suvla Bay in Gallipoli as part of the 32nd Infantry Brigade in the 11th (Northern) Division in August 1915; the battalion was evacuated to Egypt in January 1916 and then moved to France in July 1916 for service on the Western Front.

The 7th (Service) Battalion landed at Boulogne-sur-Mer as part of the 50th Infantry Brigade in the 17th (Northern) Division in July 1915 for service on the Western Front.

The 8th (Service) Battalion landed at Boulogne-sur-Mer as part of the 69th Infantry Brigade in the 23rd Division in August 1915 also for service on the Western Front.

The 9th (Service) Battalion landed at Boulogne-sur-Mer as part of the 69th Infantry Brigade in the 23rd Division in August 1915 also for service on the Western Front but moved to Italy in November 1917 and then returned to France in September 1918.

The 10th (Service) Battalion landed at Boulogne-sur-Mer as part of the 62nd Infantry Brigade in the 21st Division in September 1915 also for service on the Western Front.

The 12th (Service) Battalion, formed as the "Middlesbrough Pals" by the Mayor and Town of Middlesbrough, landed at Le Havre as a pioneer battalion to the 40th Division in June 1916 also for service on the Western Front.

The 13th (Service) Battalion landed at Le Havre as part of the 121st Infantry Brigade in the 40th Division in June 1916 also for service on the Western Front but, after returning to the United Kingdom in June 1918, moved to Murmansk in November 1918.

=== Interbellum ===
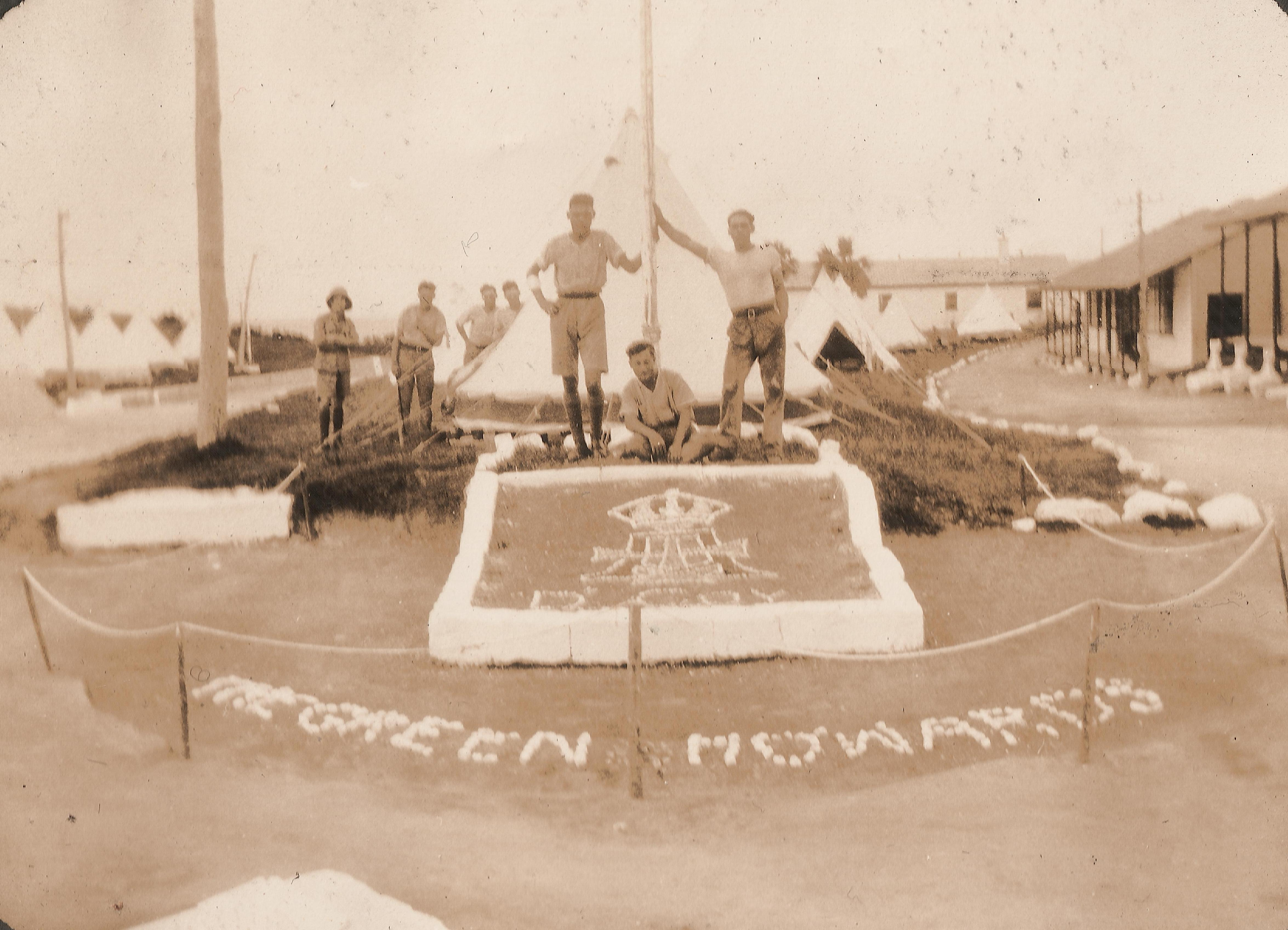
2 Battalion, Green Howards (Alexandra, Princess of Wales's Own Yorkshire Regiment) at Warwick Camp, Bermuda, circa 1925-1927

During the Interbellum, the 2nd Battalion was posted from 1925 to 1927 to the Imperial fortress colony of Bermuda, including during the 1926 Havana–Bermuda hurricane that sank HMS Valerian. The battalion's band performed a concert to raise funds for the survivors and families of the deceased.

=== Second World War ===
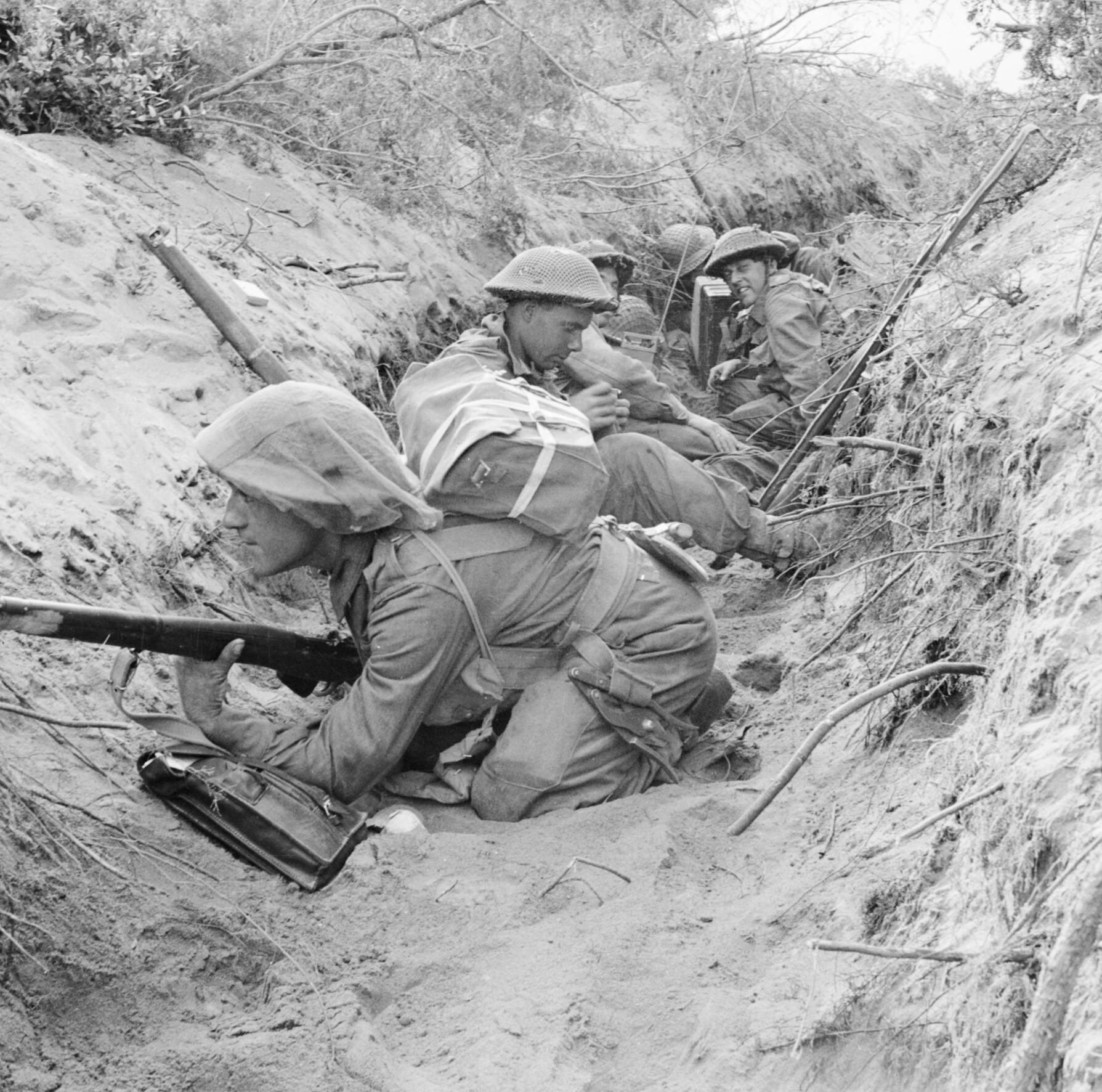
Men of D Company of the 1st Battalion, Green Howards occupy a captured German communications trench during the breakout at Anzio, Italy, 22 May 1944.

During the Second World War, the regiment was again increased in size, although not to as large an extent as in the 1914–1918 conflict. In all, twelve battalions saw service:

- 1st Battalion, with 15th Infantry Brigade of the 5th Infantry Division, seeing action in Sicily and Italy.
- 2nd Battalion, initially stationed in India, it fought in Burma as part of the 26th Indian Infantry Division and the 82nd (West Africa) Division.
- 4th and 5th Territorial Army Battalions, both serving with the 150th Infantry Brigade of the 50th (Northumbrian) Infantry Division, saw service in France and North Africa where they were captured during the Battle of Gazala.
- 6th and 7th Battalions (both formed as 2nd Line duplicates of the 4th and 5th, when the Territorial Army was doubled in size in 1939), served with 69th Brigade, originally with the 23rd (Northumbrian) Division but later the 50th Division, saw service in France, North Africa, Sicily and North West Europe.
- 8th Battalion was formed for home defence. Originally raised in August–September 1939, in the Middlesbrough area, from the Home Guard and those unfit to serve overseas. The 8th and 13th were amalgamated in June 1941, in September 1943 it was classed as a Garrison Battalion, renamed as the 30th Battalion and went to Italy, and French North Africa (Algiers and Tunisia). It was disbanded after six years service.
- 9th Battalion was formed for garrison duty (and later converted into the 108th Light Anti-Aircraft Regiment, Royal Artillery, serving with the 52nd (Lowland) Infantry Division from March 1942)
- 10th Battalion was formed by the conversion of the 2nd East Riding Yeomanry (a war-time duplicate of this yeomanry unit) in 1940 and subsequently becoming the 12th (Yorkshire) Parachute Battalion attached to the 5th Parachute Brigade and part of the 6th Airborne Division.
- The 11th, 12th and 13th Battalions were all formed in 1940.

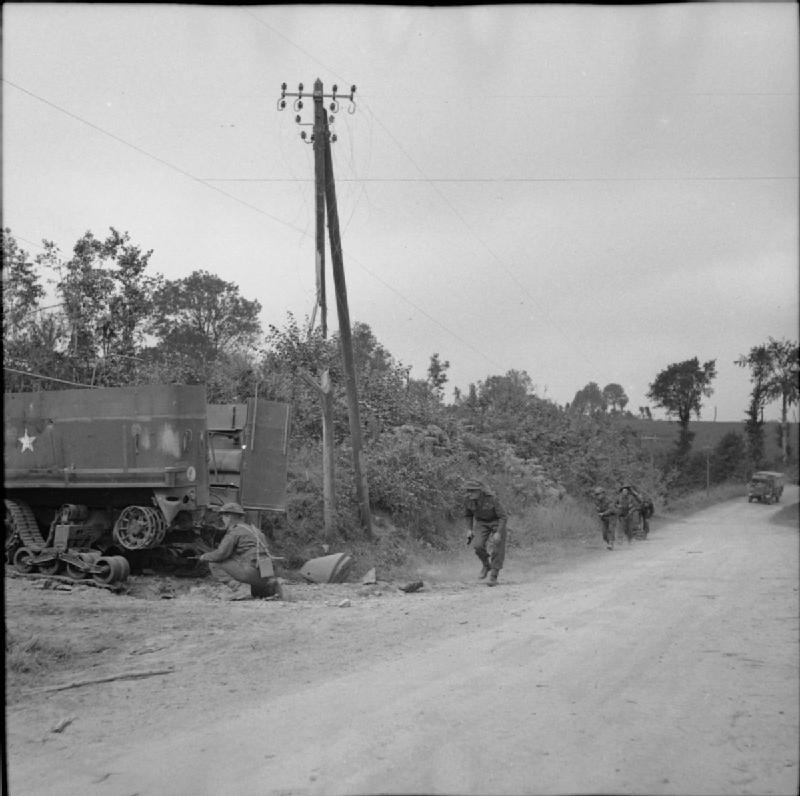
Men of the Green Howards mopping up German resistance near Tracy Bocage, Normandy, France, 4 August 1944. A knocked out half-track is visible on the left.

In 1942, the 12th Battalion was converted to armour as the 161st Regiment Royal Armoured Corps, but retained its Green Howards cap badge on the black beret of the Royal Armoured Corps as did all other infantry units converted in the same way. In October 1943 it was then converted again, this time to the reconnaissance role, as 161st (Green Howards) Regiment in the Reconnaissance Corps. It never went into action as a regiment, but provided a replacement squadron to the 43rd (Wessex) Reconnaissance Regiment, which had suffered heavy losses when its transport was sunk on the way to France to fight in the Battle of Normandy.

=== Post War ===
From 1949 to 1952, the regiment took part in the Malayan Emergency. Over the next 30 years it served in Afghanistan, Suez, Cyprus, Hong Kong, Libya, Belize, Berlin and Northern Ireland. While serving with the SAS, a former officer of the regiment, Gavin Hamilton, was killed in action during the Falklands War in 1982. It also saw action during the First Gulf War in 1991 and during the Bosnian War from 1996 to 1997.

=== Amalgamation ===
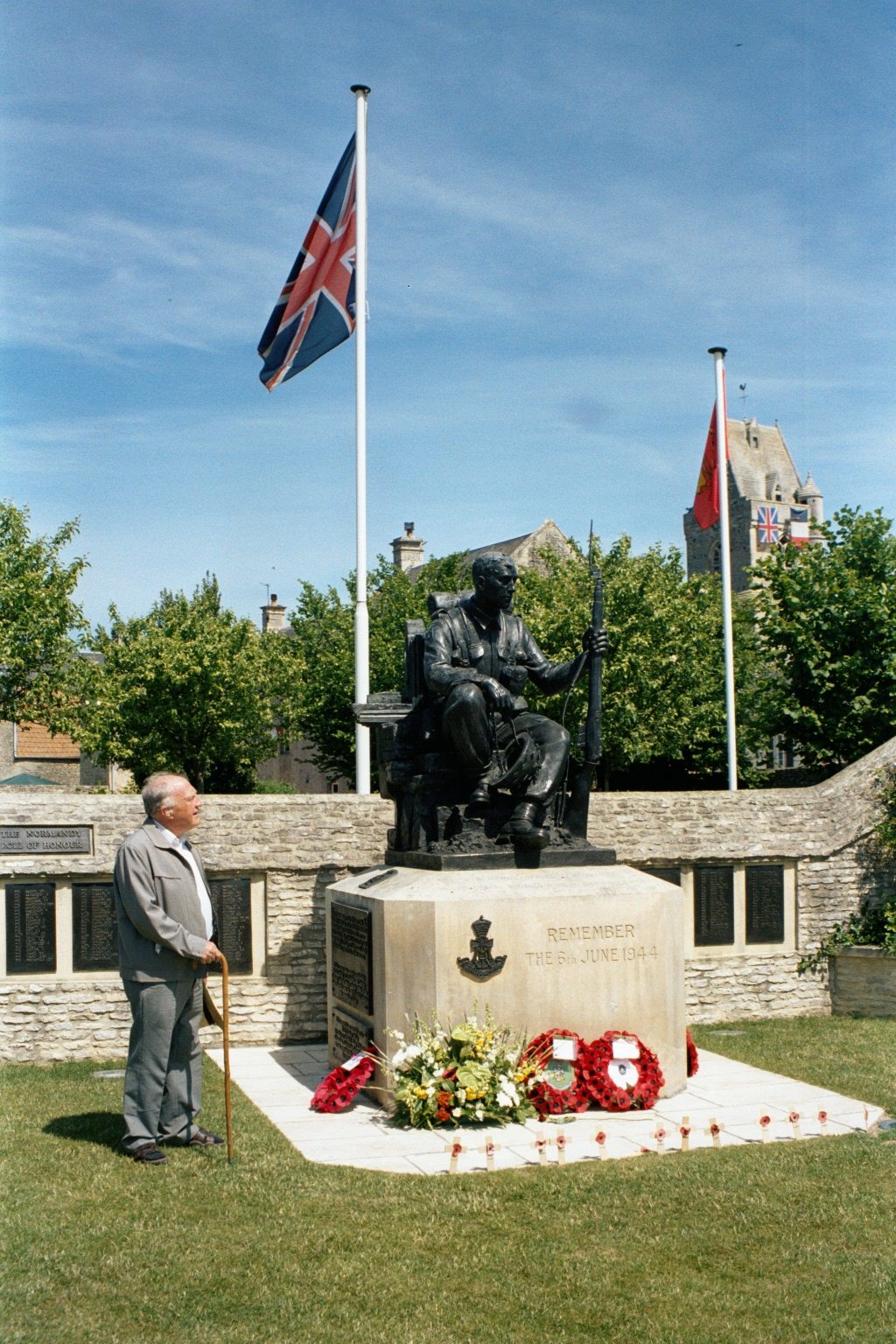
Green Howards Memorial, Crépon

In March 2006 at a farewell dinner at Dunster Castle in Somerset, the regiment paid farewell to HM King Harald V, its retiring Colonel-in-chief. Until the regiment's rebadging, the Green Howards was one of five remaining line infantry regiments that had not been amalgamated in their entire history, a claim shared with The Royal Scots, The 22nd (Cheshire) Regiment, The Royal Welch Fusiliers and The King's Own Scottish Borderers. However, on 6 June 2006 the regiment amalgamated with the Prince of Wales's Own Regiment of Yorkshire and the Duke of Wellington's Regiment (West Riding), all Yorkshire-based regiments in the King's Division, to form the Yorkshire Regiment (14th/15th, 19th and 33rd/76th Foot). The official rebadging took place on 6 June 2006, whilst elements of the regiment were stationed in Bosnia and Kosovo.

A and B (Green Howards) companies of the Tyne-Tees Regiment, based in Scarborough and Middlesbrough respectively, merged with the Prince of Wales's Own Regiment and Duke of Wellington's Regiment companies of the East and West Riding Regiment to form the 4th Battalion The Yorkshire Regiment. Following further mergers, in 2012, the 2nd Battalion The Yorkshire Regiment (Green Howards) was removed from the order of battle.

== Traditions ==
Each year, all companies in the battalion took part in a competition, consisting of sports and military skills tests, to win the right to be named 'King Harald's Company', after the regiment's Colonel-in-Chief. The winning company was given a special flag bearing the King's personal cypher, the Company Sergeant Major was presented with a special pace stick, and all members of the company were permitted to wear a special red badge on the arm of their uniform.

== Regimental Museum ==
The Green Howards Regimental Museum is located in the old Trinity Church in the centre of the market place in Richmond, North Yorkshire.

== Battle honours ==
The regiment's battle honours were as follows:

- Early Wars: Malplaquet, Belleisle, Alma, Inkerman, Sevastopol, Tirah, Relief of Kimberley, Paardeberg, South Africa 1899–1902
- The Great War: Ypres 1914, 1915, 1917, Langemarck 1914, 1917, Gheluvelt, Neuve Chapelle, St Julien, Frezenburg, Bellewaarde, Aubers Ridge, Festubert 1915, Loos, Somme 1916-1918, Albert 1916, Bazentin, Coziers, Flers-Courcelet, Morval, Thiepval, Le Transloy, Ancre Heights, Ancre 1916, Arras 1917, 1918, Scarpe 1917-1918, Messines 1917-1918, Pilckem, Menin Road, Polygon Wood, Broodseinde, Poelcappelle, Passchendaele, Cambrai 1917-18, St Quentin, Hindenburg Line, Canal du Nord, Beaurevoir, Selle, Valenciennes, Sambre, France and Flanders 1914–18, Piave, Vittorio Veneto, Italy 1917–18, Suvla, Landing at Suvla, Scimitar Hill, Gallipoli 1915, Egypt 1916, Archangel 1918, Afghanistan 1919.
- The Second War: Otta, Norway 1940, Defence of Arras, Dunkirk 1940, Normandy Landing, Tilly sur Seulles, St Pierre La Vielle, Gheel, Nederrijn, North West Europe 1940, 1944–45, Gazala, Defence of Alamein Line, El Alamein, Mareth, Akarit, North Africa 1942–43, Landing in Sicily, Lentini, Sicily 1943, Minturno, Anzio, Italy 1943–44, Arakan Beaches, Burma 1945

== Victoria Cross recipients ==
Soldiers of the Green Howards awarded the Victoria Cross (VC)

- Sergeant Alfred Atkinson, VC (18 February 1900)
- Corporal William Anderson, VC (12 March 1915)
- Second Lieutenant Ernest Frederick Beal, VC (22 March 1918)
- Second Lieutenant Donald Simpson Bell, VC (5 July 1916)
- Corporal William Clamp, VC (9 October 1917)
- Private Tom Dresser, VC (12 May 1917)
- Private Samuel Evans, VC (13 April 1855)
- Captain David Philip Hirsch, VC (9 April 1917)
- WOII Stanley Elton Hollis, VC (6 June 1944)
- Private John Lyons, VC (10 June 1855)
- Sergeant William McNally, VC MM and Bar (27 October – 29 October 1918)
- Lieutenant Colonel Derek Anthony Seagrim, VC (20 March – 21 March 1943)
- Major Stewart Walter Loudoun-Shand, VC (1 July 1916)
- Private William Short, VC (6 August 1916)
- Lieutenant William Basil Weston, VC (3 March 1945)
- Captain Archie Cecil Thomas White, VC MC (27 September – 1 October 1916)

== Colonels-in-Chief ==
- 1942–1957: Admiral HM King Haakon VII of Norway KG GCB GCVO GCStJ
- 195?–1991: Admiral of the Fleet HM King Olav V of Norway KG KT GCB GCVO
- 1992–2006: General HM King Harald V of Norway KG GCVO

== Colonels ==
Colonels of the regiment included:

=== Named after Colonel ===
e.g. Luttrell's, Erle's etc.

- 1688–1691: Col. Francis Luttrell
- 1691–1712: Gen. Thomas Erle
- 1712: Brig-Gen. George Freke
- 1712–1715: Lt-Gen. Richard Sutton [also Sutton's Foot]
- 1715–1729: Col. George Grove
- 1729–1738: Lt-Gen. Richard Sutton [reappointed]
- 1738–1748: Gen. Hon. Sir Charles Howard, KB
- 1748–1751: Lt-Gen. Lord George Beauclerk

=== 19th Regiment of Foot (1751) ===
- 1751–1768: Lt-Gen. Lord George Beauclerk
- 1768–1782: Gen. David Graeme

=== 19th (The 1st Yorkshire North Riding) Regiment of Foot - (1782) ===
- 1782–1797: Gen. David Graeme
- 1797–1810: F.M. Samuel Hulse
- 1810–1811: Gen. Sir Hew Dalrymple, 1st Baronet
- 1811–1843: Gen. Sir Hilgrove Turner GCH
- 1843–1849: Gen. Sir Warren Marmaduke Peacocke, KCH
- 1849–1854: Lt-Gen. Charles Turner
- 1854–1861: F.M. Sir William Rowan, GCB
- 1861–1886: Gen. Sir Abraham Josias Cloëté, KCB, KH

=== The Princess of Wales's Own (Yorkshire Regiment) - (1881) ===
- 1886–1896: Gen. Sir Robert Onesiphorus Bright, GCB
- 1896–1902: Lt-Gen. Edward Chippindall, CB

=== Alexandra, Princess of Wales's Own (Yorkshire Regiment) - (1902) ===
- 1902–1906: Maj-Gen. William Spencer Cooper
- 1906–1914: Lt-Gen. Sir William Edmund Franklyn, KCB
- 1914–1939: Gen. Sir Edward Stanislaus Bulfin, KCB, CVO

=== The Green Howards (Alexandra, Princess of Wales's Own Yorkshire Regiment) - (1921) ===
- 1939–1949: Gen. Sir Harold Edmund Franklyn, KCB, DSO
- 1949–1959: Maj-Gen. Alfred Eryk Robinson, CB, DSO
- 1959–1965: Brig. George Wilfred Eden, CBE
- 1965–1975: Maj-Gen. Desmond Spencer Gordon, CB, CBE, DSO, JP
- 1975–1982: Brig. John Britton Oldfield, OBE, DL
- 1982–1994: F.M. The Rt. Hon. Peter Anthony Inge, The Baron Inge, KG, GCB
- 1994–2003: Gen. Sir Francis Richard Dannatt, KCB, CBE, MC
- 2003–2006: Brig. John Stewart Wadsworth Powell, OBE

== Alliances ==
Present:

- The Queen's York Rangers (1st American Regiment) (RCAC)
- The Rocky Mountain Rangers

Past:

- The York Rangers

Bond of Friendship:

- HMS Richmond

Unofficial:

- Hans Majestet Kongens Garde

== Uniforms ==
The precise date on which the regiment adopted the green facings from which it derived its name is uncertain, with yellow known to have been the colour of the lapels in 1709. However the official Cloathing Book of 1742 shows full green facings being worn on the standard red coats of the era. Thereafter the actual shade of the regimental colour changed at various times from yellow-green to a dull green. White facings were worn from 1881 until 1899 when green was restored. The remaining features of the Green Howard's uniform followed the normal British infantry progression from red coat to scarlet tunic to khaki service dress and battle dress.

== See also ==
- Category:Green Howards officers
- Yorkshire Regiment
- Tyne-Tees Regiment

== Sources ==
- Beckett, Ian (2003). Discovering English County Regiments. Shire Publications. ISBN 978-0747805069.
- Cannon, Richard (1984) [1848]. Historical record of the Nineteenth or First Yorkshire North Riding Regiment of Foot containing an account of the formation of the regiment in 1688 and of its subsequent services to 1848. CIHM/ICMH Microfiche series = CIHM/ICMH collection de microfiches; no. 48383. Parker, Furnivall and Parker. ISBN 9780665483837.
- Forty, George (1998). British Army Handbook 1939–1945. Stroud: Sutton Publishing. ISBN 978-0753703328.
- Lt-Col H.F. Joslen, Orders of Battle, United Kingdom and Colonial Formations and Units in the Second World War, 1939–1945, London: HM Stationery Office, 1960/London: London Stamp Exchange, 1990, ISBN 0-948130-03-2/Uckfield: Naval & Military Press, 2003, ISBN 1-843424-74-6.
- Powell, Geoffrey (2015). The History of the Green Howards. Pen & Sword Military. ISBN 978-1473857964.
- Rodger, N. A. M. (1986). The Wooden World: An Anatomy of the Georgian Navy. Annapolis, Maryland: Naval Institute Press. ISBN 0870219871.
- Christopher L. Scott, The military effectiveness of the West Country Militia at the time of the Monmouth Rebellion, Cranfield University PhD thesis 2011.
