= Robert Onesiphorus Bright =

British Army officer

General Sir Robert Onesiphorus Bright GCB
- Born: 7 July 1823
- Died: 15 November 1896 (aged 73); Guildford, Surrey
- Military career
- Allegiance: United Kingdom
- Branch: British Army
- Rank: General
- Awards: Knight Grand Cross of the Order of the Bath

General Sir Robert Onesiphorus Bright GCB (7 July 1823 – 15 November 1896) was a British Army officer.

He was born the son of Robert Bright and the brother of colonial businessman Charles Edward Bright and the MP Richard Bright.

He was educated at Winchester School and joined the 19th (The 1st Yorkshire North Riding) Regiment of Foot in 1843. He served in Bulgaria in 1854 and commanded the 2nd Brigade of the Light Division during the Crimean War. Promoted brigadier-general, he commanded the 1st Brigade Hazara Field Force during the Black Mountain Campaign of 1868 and commanded the Khyber Line Field Force during the 2nd Afghan War of 1878–80.

He was awarded CB in 1881 and elevated to GCB in 1894. He was given the colonelcy of The Princess of Wales's Own (Yorkshire Regiment) from 1886 to his death and promoted full general on 1 April 1887.

Bright was a noted cricketer and all-round sportsman and ran a pack of foxhounds named "The Green Howards".

== Death ==
He died in 1896 at his home in Guildford, Surrey, and was buried in St Mark's Church, Wyke, Surrey. He had married Catherine Miles, the daughter of Sir William Miles, 1st Baronet, and had three sons and five daughters.

Military offices
Preceded by Sir Abraham Josias Cloëté	Colonel of Alexandra, Princess of Wales's Own (Yorkshire Regiment); 1886–1896	Succeeded by Edward Chippindall
