= Bécordel-Bécourt =

- Commune
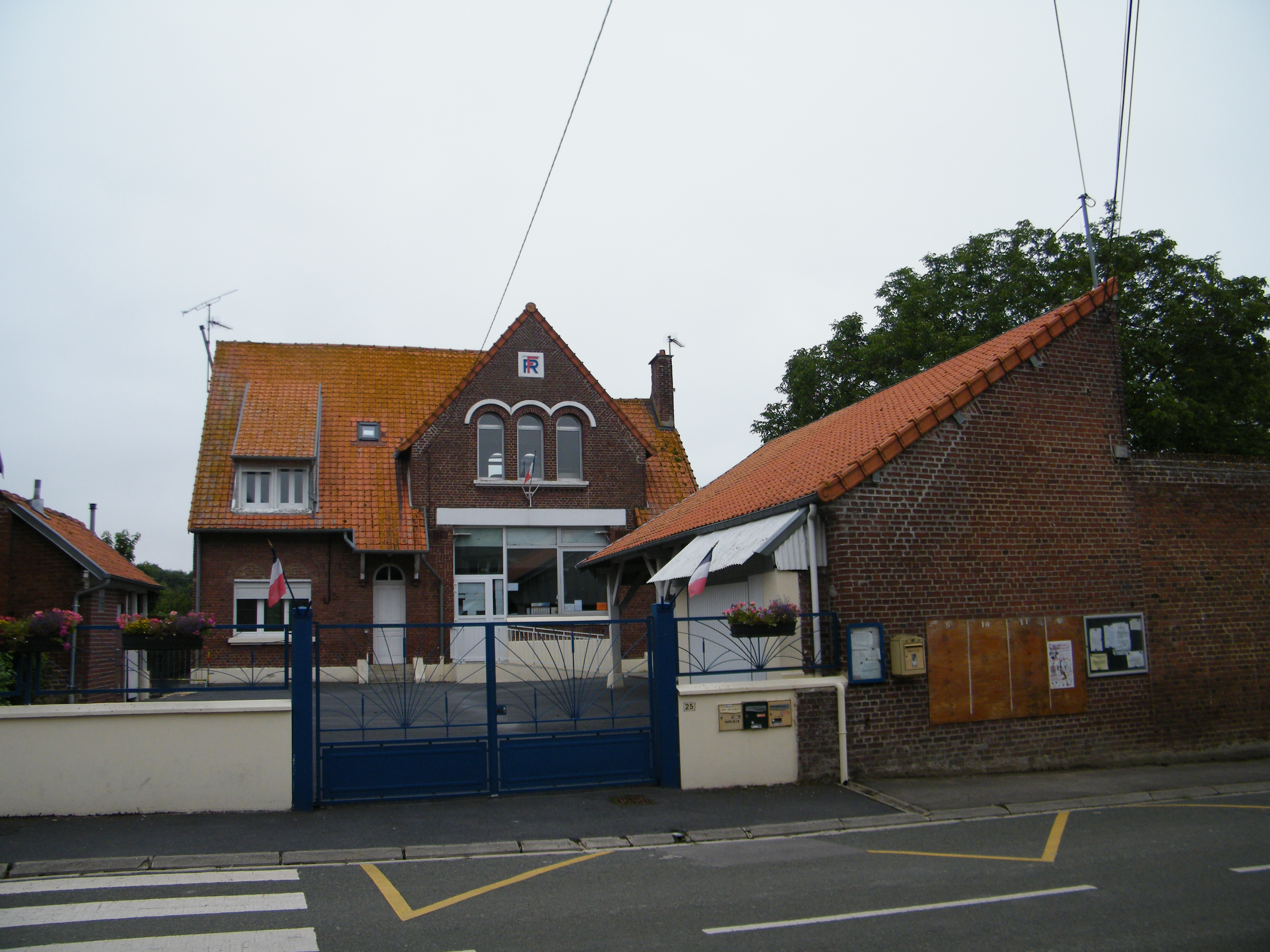
- The town hall and school of Bécordel-Bécourt
- Location of Bécordel-Bécourt
- Location within France Location within Hauts-de-France
- Coordinates: 49°59′25″N 2°41′10″E
- Country: France
- Region: Hauts-de-France
- Department: Somme
- Arrondissement: Péronne
- Canton: Albert
- Intercommunality: Pays du Coquelicot

Government
  - Mayor (2020–2026): Dominique Devillers
- Area^{1}: 3.57 km^{2} (1.38 sq mi)
- Elevation: 56 m (184 ft)
- Highest elevation: 110 m (360 ft)
- Lowest elevation: 50 m (160 ft)
- Population (2023): 153
  - Density: 42.9/km^{2} (111/sq mi)
- Time zone: UTC+01:00 (CET)
  - Summer (DST): UTC+02:00 (CEST)
- INSEE/Postal code: 80073 /80300
- ^{1} French Land Register data, which excludes lakes, ponds, glaciers > 1 km^{2} (0.386 sq mi or 247 acres) and river estuaries.

Bécordel-Bécourt (French pronunciation: [bekɔʁdɛl bekuʁ]; before 1900: Bécourt-Bécordel) is a commune in the Somme department in Hauts-de-France in northern France.

== Geography ==
Situated on the D938 road, about 2 miles (3 km) southeast of Albert.

== History ==
The village of Bécourt was destroyed in the First World War, see Battle of Albert (1914).

== Population ==
Historical population
Year	Pop.	±% p.a.
1968	146	—
1975	144	−0.20%
1982	142	−0.20%
1990	139	−0.27%
1999	122	−1.44%
2007	169	+4.16%
2012	163	−0.72%
2017	160	−0.37%
2023	153	−0.74%
Source: INSEE

== See also ==
- Communes of the Somme department
