= Hill 10 Commonwealth War Graves Commission Cemetery =

CWGC cemetery in Gallipoli, Turkey

Coordinates: 40.312°N 26.253°E

Hill 10
- Commonwealth War Graves Commission
- Used for those deceased August–December 1915
- Established: 1915
- Location: near Gallipoli, Turkey
- Total burials: 699
- Unknowns: 150

Burials by nation
- Allied Powers: Australian: 2; Newfoundland: 8; British: 547

Burials by war
- World War I: 699

Hill 10 Cemetery is a Commonwealth War Graves Commission Cemetery in the former Suvla Bay sector of the Gallipoli Peninsula, Turkey. The battles at Gallipoli, some of whose participating soldiers are buried at this cemetery, was an eight-month campaign fought by Commonwealth and French forces against Turkish forces in an attempt to force Turkey out of the war, to relieve the deadlock of the Western Front (France/Belgium) and to open a supply route to Russia through the Dardanelles and the Black Sea.

The main landings were in April 1915, but failure to make any progress led to a further landing at Suvla Bay to the North of the existing Allied positions on 6 August. However indecision and confusion led delays allowing the Turkish defenders to reinforce their positions, resulting in a stalemate.

Hill 10 was a small hill North of the Suvla Bay salt lake and was captured by 9th Lancashire Fusiliers and the 11th Manchesters the following morning. Originally a burial site containing just 3 graves from November 1915, the cemetery was greatly enlarged after the Armistice, when graves consolidated from six smaller cemeteries - the 88th Dressing Station, 89th Dressing Station, Kangaroo Beach, 'B' Beach, 26th Casualty Clearing Station and Park Lane cemeteries. 150 of the graves are unidentified, but there are memorials to the 55 British soldiers and sailors and the single Royal Australian Navy Bridging Train member known to be amongst them.

The Gallipoli Newfoundland Memorial is located 25 metres to the northwest.
