= Edward Backhouse (British Army officer) =

British Army brigadier (1895–1973)

Brigadier Edward Backhouse CBE DL
- Born: 7 February 1895; Bosmere, Ipswich, Suffolk, England
- Died: 20 November 1973 (aged 78); Bury St Edmunds, Suffolk, England
- Military career
- Allegiance: United Kingdom
- Branch: British Army
- Service years: 1914–1948
- Rank: Brigadier
- Service number: 8321
- Unit: Suffolk Regiment
- Commands: 1st Battalion, Suffolk Regiment; 54th Infantry Brigade
- Conflicts: World War I World War II
- Awards: Commander of the Order of the British Empire; Mentioned in despatches
- Other work: Colonel of the Suffolk Regiment

Brigadier Edward Henry Walford Backhouse CBE DL (7 February 1895 – 20 November 1973) was a British Army officer who served in both world wars and was unlucky enough to have been taken prisoner in both conflicts.

== Early life ==
Backhouse was born in Suffolk, the son of Rev. Edward Bell Backhouse and Mary Anne Emmeline Walford. He was educated at St. Lawrence College, Ramsgate, before attending the Royal Military College, Sandhurst.

== Military career ==
Upon passing out from Sandhurst, Backhouse was commissioned as a second lieutenant into the Suffolk Regiment, a line infantry regiment of the British Army, on 25 February 1914. Three of his fellow graduates were Eric Dorman-Smith, Ronald Scobie and Gerard Bucknall. He was posted to the regiment's 2nd Battalion, then stationed in Curragh, Ireland, as part of the 14th Brigade of Major-General Charles Fergusson's 5th Division. Sent to France with his battalion in the opening stages of the First World War in mid-August 1914, he was wounded and captured at the Battle of Le Cateau on 26 August, less than a month after the outbreak of war. He was promoted to captain on 1 January 1917, while still a prisoner of war (POW).

Following his release after the end of the war, Backhouse returned to service with the Suffolk Regiment. Between 1927 and 1928 he attended the Staff College, Camberley, and from 1929 to 1932 he was a staff captain in Southern Command. He then served as a brigade major of the 10th Infantry Brigade before becoming Officer commanding (OC), Depot Suffolk Regiment in 1934. Between 1936 and 1938 Backhouse held various positions at the War Office. He relinquished his assignment as GSO2 there on 14 February 1938. and from 1938 to 1939 he was commanding officer (CO) of the 1st Battalion, Suffolk Regiment.

Shortly before the outbreak of the Second World War in September 1939, Backhouse, after being promoted to the temporary rank of brigadier on 28 August, took command of the 54th Infantry Brigade, a newly created second-line Territorial Army (TA) unit which formed part of the 18th Infantry Division. For a brief period in 1940, between 20 April and 14 May, Backhouse was the acting General Officer Commanding (GOC) of the 18th Division while the division's permanent commander, Major-General Bernard Paget was engaged in the disastrous Norwegian campaign.

After training in the United Kingdom for just over two years, the brigade, along with the rest of the 18th Division, was deployed to British Malaya. Backhouse led the 54th Brigade during the fall of Singapore and following the British garrison's surrender was taken as a POW, for the second time in his military career, this time by the Japanese. He was released from capture at the end of the war and in 1946 he was mentioned in dispatches for his leadership during the fall of Singapore in 1942. On 10 February 1948 Backhouse retired from the regular army with the honorary rank of brigadier.

From 1947 to 1957 Backhouse served as the honorary colonel of the Suffolk Regiment, and in 1949 he was made a Deputy lieutenant for Suffolk, before being made a Vice-Lieutenant for the county in 1965. From 1953 to 1959 Backhouse was chairman of the Suffolk Territorial and Auxiliary Forces Association. He was made a Commander of the Order of the British Empire in the 1961 New Year Honours.

== Personal life ==
He married Eileen Noël Newby Jenks in Colchester in 1920; together they had one son, Colin Backhouse, and one daughter, June Backhouse.

Honorary titles
Preceded by Walter Nicholson	Colonel of the Suffolk Regiment; 1947–1957	Succeeded by Richard Maxwell
