= 3rd Battalion, Yorkshire Volunteers =

3rd Battalion, Yorkshire Volunteers 3rd Battalion (West Yorkshire), Yorkshire Volunteers
- Active: 1 April 1971–4 April 1992; 21 years, 3 days
- Country: United Kingdom
- Branch: British Army
- Type: Light Infantry
- Size: Battalion
- Part of: 54th (East Anglian) Infantry Brigade
- Battalion HQ: Huddersfield
- Nickname: 3 YORKS

The 3rd Battalion (West Yorkshire), Yorkshire Volunteers was an infantry battalion of the only full Territorial Army (TA) regiment in Yorkshire. The battalion was formed along with the 2nd (Yorkshire and Humberside) Battalion of the same regiment in 1971. In 1992, following the end of the Cold War, the 3rd and 4th battalions amalgamated, ending the official lineage.

== Formation ==
In 1967, the former Territorial Army (TA) was subsumed into the much smaller Territorial and Army Volunteer Reserve, within which a new regiment, the Yorkshire Volunteers (YORKS), was formed. The new regiment maintained only one battalion until 1971, when many of the cadres formed in 1967 were reformed and the YORKS regiment was expanded into three battalions. Therefore, on 1 April 1971 the 3rd Battalion, Yorkshire Volunteers was formed from cadres of the West Yorkshire TA.

On formation, the new battalion was organised as follows:

- Battalion Headquarters, in Huddersfield
- Headquarters Company, in Huddersfield (from cadre of the West Yorkshire Battalion, The Duke of Wellington's Regiment)
- A (The West Riding Artillery) Battery, in Bradford with detachment in Keighley (from cadre of the West Riding Regiment, Royal Artillery) – later redesignated as a 'Company'
- B (The Sheffield Artillery Volunteers) Battery, in Rotherham (from cadre of the Sheffield Artillery Volunteers, Royal Artillery) – later redesignated as a 'Company'
- C (The Duke of Wellington's Regiment) Company, in Huddersfield (from cadre of the West Riding Battalion, The Duke of Wellington's Regiment)
- D (Hallamshire) Company, in Barnsley (from cadre of the Hallamshire Battalion, York and Lancaster Regiment)

== Service ==
In 1975, A (WRA) Company moved to Keighley, while retaining its detachment at Bradford. In 1984, as part of the 1981 Defence White Paper, the 'Home Service Force' was formed, which maintained a company in every TA battalion/regiment by 1992. The new force was tasked with defending important locations and was made up mostly of retired TA or Regular Army personnel. Therefore, in 1984 H (Home Service Force) Company was formed in Huddersfield.

On 1 January 1988, the 4th Battalion (South Yorkshire), Yorkshire Volunteers was formed, and the 3rd battalion was subsequently reorganised. B (Sheffield Artillery Volunteers) Bty in Rotherham and D (Hallamshire) Company in Barnsley transferred to the new battalion as B (Sheffield Artillery Volunteers) and A (Hallamshire) Companies respectively. A new B (The Leeds Rifles) Company was formed in Leeds by transfer of A Company of the 1st Battalion; a new D (The Duke of Wellington's Regiment) Company was formed in Halifax by transfer of C Company of the 1st Battalion.

By 1989, the battalion was part of the 54th (East Anglian) Infantry Brigade which was tasked with guarding the North Eastern/Eastern ports if mobilised for war against the Warsaw Pact. On 17 January 1989, the battalion was redesignated as the 3rd Battalion (West Yorkshire), Yorkshire Volunteers.

At this time, the battalion was organised as follows:

- Battalion Headquarters, in Huddersfield
- Headquarters Company, in Huddersfield
- A (The West Riding Artillery) Company, in Keighley with detachment in Bradford
- B (The Leeds Rifles) Company, in Leeds
- C (The Duke of Wellington's Regiment) Company, in Huddersfield
- D (The Duke of Wellington's Regiment) Company, in Halifax
- H (Home Service Force) Company, in Huddersfield

== Disbandment ==
In 1992, following the Dissolution of the Soviet Union and subsequent end of the Cold War, the Options for Change reform was announced which significantly reduced the size of the British Armed Forces. As part of this reform, the TA was also reduced, with many battalions being disbanded or reduced in size. On 4 April 1992, the battalion amalgamated with the 4th Battalion (South Yorkshire) to form the new 3rd/4th Battalion, Yorkshire Volunteers.

As a result of the amalgamation, HQ Company was disbanded, with personnel transferred to the new HQ and C Companies of the new battalion; A (West Riding Artillery) and D (Duke of Wellington's Regiment) Companies were amalgamated to form B (The Duke of Wellington's Regiment) Company; and C (The Duke of Wellington's Regiment) Company was transferred to the new battalion unaltered. B (Leeds Rifles) Company was transferred as C (The Leeds Rifles) Company in the 2nd Battalion, while H (Home Service Force) Company was disbanded following the disbandment of the Home Service Force.

== Honorary colonels ==
Honorary colonels of the battalion included:

- 1 April 1971 – 23 November 1972: vacant
- 23 November 1972 – 23 November 1977: Major General Ronald Macauley Somerville (Note: Also Colonel Commandant of the Royal Artillery)
- 23 November 1977 – 23 November 1983: Major General Donald Edward Isles (Note: Also Regimental Colonel of the Duke of Wellington's Regiment)
- 23 November 1983 – 30 April 1990: General Sir Martin Farndale (Note: Also Colonel Commandant of the Royal Horse Artillery and Army Air Corps)
- 30 April 1990 – 4 April 1992: Brigadier William Richard Mundell (Note: Remained until 1993, also Regimental Colonel of the Duke of Wellington's Regiment)

In 1971 and 1972, each company maintained their own 'Deputy Honorary Colonels', however this ended in 1972.

== Footnotes ==
Notes

Citations
