= Harold Franklyn =

British Army general (1885–1963)

General Sir Harold Franklyn KCB DSO MC
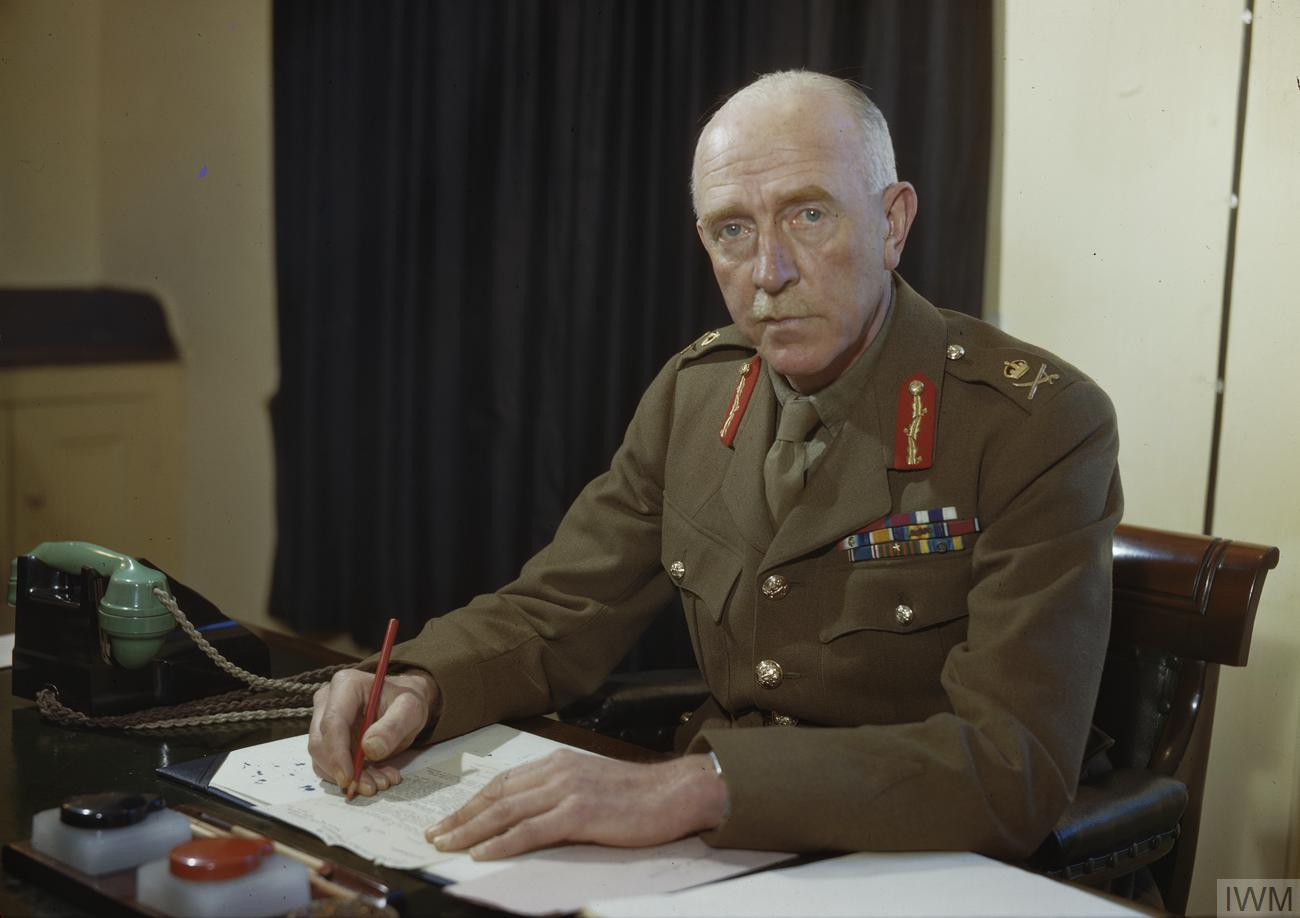
- Lieutenant-General Sir Harold Franklyn in August 1943
- Born: 28 November 1885; Cork, County Cork, Ireland
- Died: 31 March 1963 (aged 77); Newbury, Berkshire, England
- Burial place: St. Mary the Virgin Churchyard, Speen, Berkshire, England
- Relatives: Sir William Franklyn (father); Geoffrey Franklyn (brother)
- Military career
- Allegiance: United Kingdom
- Branch: British Army
- Service years: 1905–1945
- Rank: General
- Service number: 3285
- Commands: Home Forces (1943–1945); British Troops in Northern Ireland (1941–1943); VIII Corps (1940–1941); 5th Infantry Division (1938–1940); Sudan Defence Force (1935–1938); 1st Battalion, West Yorkshire Regiment (1930–1933)
- Conflicts: First World War; Second World War
- Awards: Knight Commander of the Order of the Bath; Distinguished Service Order; Military Cross; Mentioned in Despatches (6); Croix de Guerre (France); Grand Officer of the Order of the Nile (Egypt)

General Sir Harold Edmund Franklyn, KCB, DSO, MC (28 November 1885 − 31 March 1963) was a British Army officer who fought in both the First and the Second World Wars. He is most notable for his command of the 5th Infantry Division during the Battle of France in May/June 1940.

== Early life and First World War ==
Harold Edmund Franklyn was born in Cork, County Cork, Ireland, on 28 November 1885, the son of William Franklyn, a British Army officer who later became a lieutenant general. He was educated in England at Rugby School and the Royal Military College, Sandhurst, where he was commissioned as a second lieutenant into his father's regiment, the Alexandra, Princess of Wales's Own (Yorkshire Regiment) on 16 August 1905. Promoted to lieutenant on 16 January 1908, he married Monica Belfield, daughter of Lieutenant General Herbert Belfield, in 1913; they had one daughter and one son. In March 1910 he was appointed as an aide-de-camp to his father, then commanding the 3rd Division, By 1914, the year of his father's death and the outbreak of the First World War, he was attending the Staff College, Camberley.

Franklyn served in the First World War, mainly on the Western Front and as a staff officer. Soon after the outbreak of war in August 1914, Franklyn, graduating early from the Staff College, was made an assistant embarkation staff officer, later serving briefly as adjutant with the 6th (Service) Battalion, Yorkshire Regiment, a newly created Kitchener's Army unit composed of volunteers. On 23 October he was made a staff captain. This was followed, on 31 October, by a promotion to captain. After having served as a General Staff Officer Grade 3 and a brigade major, Franklyn was promoted to brevet major on 3 June 1916, and served on the operations staff of the 21st Division, also a Kitchener's Army unit, and was involved in the division's preparations for the Battle of the Somme. After the division's involvement in the Battle of Arras in April 1917, followed by the Battle of Passchendaele, Franklyn became the senior staff officer in the division in mid-October, remaining in this role until hostilities ceased in November 1918. During the war, Franklyn was six times mentioned in despatches and was awarded the Distinguished Service Order and the Military Cross.

== Inter-war period ==
After the war, Franklyn was promoted to major upon transferring to the East Lancashire Regiment on 19 August 1925, and served at the Staff College, Camberley, as Deputy Assistant Adjutant General (DAAG) from 31 August 1925 until 31 August 1928. Transferring on 10 May 1930 and receiving promotion to lieutenant colonel in the West Yorkshire Regiment, he became Commanding officer of the regiment's 1st Battalion in 1930, and transferred to the Sudan Defence Force in 1933, initially as a General Staff Officer and then from 1935 until 1938 as Commandant. Promoted to colonel on 28 November 1933, on his forty-eighth birthday, he was, on 29 January 1938, promoted to major general (with seniority backdated to 1 January 1938). In December 1938, he returned to Britain where he was appointed General Officer Commanding (GOC) of the 5th Infantry Division. The division was stationed in and around Catterick in North Yorkshire under the control of Northern Command, but was severely understrength having recently returned from Palestine. On 21 August 1939, Franklyn was made Colonel of the Green Howards. In late 1939, he was appointed a Grand Officer of the Order of the Nile in recognition of his service in Sudan.

== Second World War ==
=== France and Belgium ===
When the Second World War broke out in September 1939, the division was not fully formed and arrived piecemeal in France over the next few weeks and months as independent formations where it became part of the British Expeditionary Force (BEF). The divisional HQ only arrived in France in mid-December.

The division, composed of the 13th, the 15th and the 17th Infantry Brigades as well as supporting units. Although the 15th Brigade saw contact with the enemy on the Saar front in January and February, the division, as a whole, saw little action, and time was spent digging defensive positions in expectation of a repeat of the trench warfare of the First World War. In April, the 15th Brigade was detached from the division for participation in the disastrous Norwegian campaign, leaving Franklyn's 5th Division with just two infantry brigades.

The War Office in London had intended for the 5th Division to return to the United Kingdom as a reserve. By 9 May, many units had already reached the Channel Ports, but the order was cancelled. The German Army launched its assault in the West the day after, and the division joined III Corps was assigned just days later to I Corps, which was manning a defensive line on the River Senne. After withdrawing, the division was held in reserve until moving to Arras, which was then under attack from several German panzer divisions. The Germans had broken through the French armies on the BEF's right flank, and were sweeping their way west and northwards, aiming for the Channel coast. Senior Allied commanders believed a counterattack necessary, to be made southwards from Arras, and Franklyn was assigned to command "Frankforce". "Frankforce" was composed of Franklyn's 5th Division, along with the 50th (Northumbrian) Infantry Division and the 1st Army Tank Brigade. On 21 May, the attack went in and was initially very successful, greatly surprising the Germans. However, French support did not materialise on time and Franklyn was forced on the defensive and ordered to hold the high ground on Vimy Ridge. "Frankforce" came under heavy attack and ordered to withdraw on the night of 23 May.

"Frankforce" was ordered to use the 5th and 50th Divisions to attack across the German lines of communication and link up with the French attacking from the Somme. On 25 May, this order was countermanded and "Frankforce", in one of the most important decisions of the campaign, was ordered to fill the gap between the Belgian Army and the BEF along the Ypres–Comines Canal. Franklyn's 5th Division fought in the Battle of the Ypres–Comines Canal and engaged in some of the toughest fighting of the war so far, with the Germans concentrating to eliminate the division. As the battle wore on, more units came under Franklyn's command, including the 10th and the 11th Brigade as well as elements of the 1st Division and heavy artillery from I Corps. By holding the line on the night of 27 May, Franklyn enabled Major General Bernard Montgomery's 3rd Division to cross behind Franklyn's rear to fill the huge gap caused by the Belgian Army's surrender. Franklyn's stand was hailed by Lieutenant General Sir Alan Brooke, commanding the II Corps, under whose command the 5th Division was serving under, as having saved the BEF from destruction. Brooke wrote in his diary that "Franklyn had put up a very fine show and the 5th Division had fought admirably". Lieutenant General Sir Henry Pownall, chief of staff to General Lord Gort, commander of the BEF, believed Franklyn to be the outstanding British divisional commander of the campaign. Brooke then gave orders for Franklyn and his division, now reduced to roughly 600 men in each of his two brigades, to withdraw from their positions and retreat to the Dunkirk perimeter, which they did on the night of 29 May and were subsequently evacuated to England over the next few days.

=== Britain ===
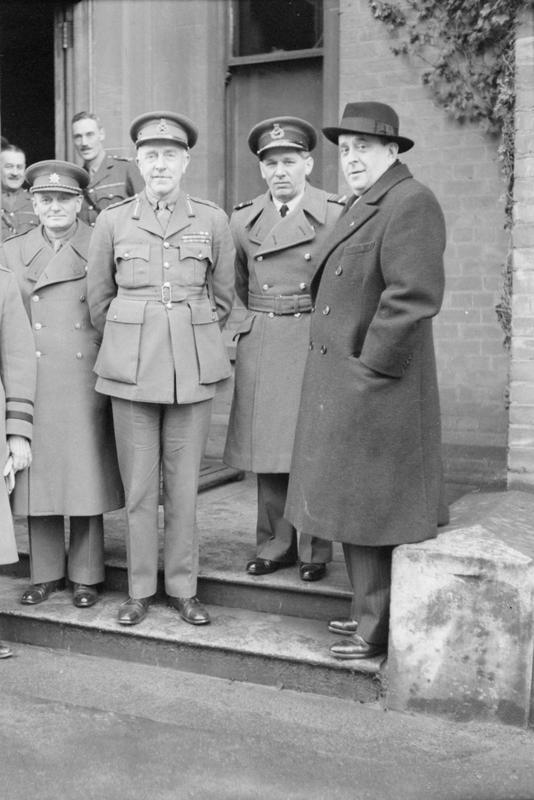
Members of the Czech Government in Exile visiting Northern Ireland. Left to right: Brigadier General Edmund Hill (USA); General Jan Sergěj Ingr, Minister of National Defence and C-in-C of Czechoslovak Forces; Lieutenant General Harold Franklyn; Air Vice Marshal Karel Janoušek, GOC Czechoslovak Air Force; and Jan Masaryk, Deputy Prime Minister and Foreign Minister of Czechoslovakia.

After returning to England on 1 June, Franklyn and his division were sent to Scotland to serve under Scottish Command. In July, the 15th Brigade, having evacuated from Norway in early May, rejoined the division. Franklyn was made a Companion of the Order of the Bath on 11 July 1940. On 19 July, Franklyn relinquished command of the 5th Division, was promoted to acting lieutenant general on 19 July, and ordered to establish a new VIII Corps. With fears throughout the country of a German invasion, Franklyn was responsible for the defence of the counties of Devon, Cornwall and Somerset, a very long line of coast to defend, but one which was considered a less likely invasion target.

In May 1941, Franklyn was appointed as C-in-C of Northern Ireland and left VIII Corps. Additional troops were placed under his command, and Franklyn established a superior formation, entitled British Troops in Northern Ireland. Franklyn's rank of lieutenant general was made temporary on 19 July 1941, and permanent on 30 September. Franklyn was made a Knight Commander of the Order of the Bath on 1 January 1943, and remained in his post as C-in-C Northern Ireland until 23 July 1943 when he was promoted to the rank of full general and became Commander-in-Chief, Home Forces. On 27 September 1944, Franklyn's son, Captain John Belfield Edmund Franklyn, was killed in action in Holland.

== Postwar ==
Franklyn retired from the army on 15 October 1945. In May 1946, he was appointed chairman of the Battles Nomenclature Committee for the Second World War. Franklyn relinquished the colonelcy of his old regiment, the Green Howards (Alexandra, Princess of Wales's Own Yorkshire Regiment) on 21 October 1949. He retired to Newbury, Berkshire, where he died on 31 March 1963, four years after the death of his wife, at the age of 77, from a heart attack.

== Bibliography ==
- Harman, Nicholas. (1980) Dunkirk; the necessary myth. London: Hodder and Stoughton. ISBN 0-340-24299-X
- Mead, Richard (2007). Churchill's Lions: A Biographical Guide to the Key British Generals of World War II. Stroud: Spellmount. ISBN 978-1-86227-431-0.
- Smart, Nick (2005). Biographical Dictionary of British Generals of the Second World War. Barnesley: Pen & Sword. ISBN 1844150496.

Military offices
Preceded by Stephen Butler	Commandant of the Sudan Defence Force; 1935–1938	Succeeded by William Platt
Preceded by Guy Williams	GOC 5th Infantry Division; 1938–1940	Succeeded by Horatio Berney-Ficklin
New command	GOC VIII Corps; 1940–1941	Succeeded by Kenneth Anderson
Preceded by Sir Bernard Paget	C-in-C Home Forces; 1943–1945	Post disbanded
Honorary titles
Preceded by Sir Edward Bulfin	Colonel of the Green Howards (Alexandria, Princess of Wales's Own Yorkshire Regiment); 1939–1949	Succeeded by Alfred Robinson
