= William Franklyn (British Army officer) =

British Army general (1856-1914)

Lieutenant-General Sir William Franklyn KCB
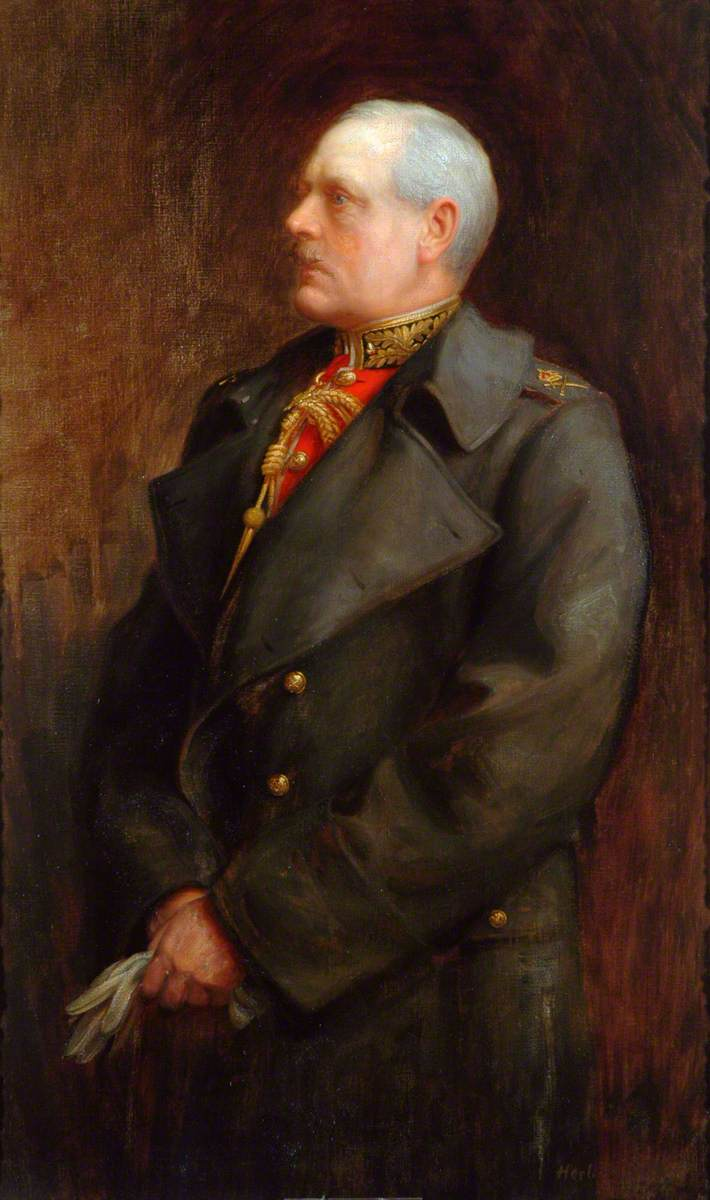
- Painting of Franklyn by Herbert James Draper, c. 1912
- Born: 14 May 1856; Ventnor, Isle of Wight, England
- Died: 27 October 1914 (aged 58); Luton Hoo, Hertford, England
- Burial place: Paddington Old Cemetery
- Relatives: Sir Harold Franklyn (son); Geoffrey Franklyn (son); Lord Thorneycroft (grandson)
- Military career
- Allegiance: United Kingdom
- Branch: British Army
- Service years: 1874–1914
- Rank: Lieutenant-General
- Unit: Green Howards
- Commands: 3rd Division; 4th Division; 10th Brigade; 2nd Battalion, Yorkshire Regiment
- Conflicts: North West Frontier; First World War
- Awards: Knight Commander of the Order of the Bath

Lieutenant-general Sir William Edmund Franklyn, KCB (14 May 1856 – 27 October 1914) was a senior British Army officer who served as military secretary from 1911 to 1914.

== Early life and education ==
Franklyn was born in Ventnor, Isle of Wight, the eldest surviving son of Rev. Thomas Edmund Franklyn and Selina Elizabeth Hope. He was educated at Rugby School.

== Military career ==
Franklyn was commissioned into the 19th Regiment of Foot in 1874, which in 1881 became the Yorkshire Regiment (and later still became the Green Howards) and was appointed deputy assistant adjutant general at Aldershot in 1888. He was made commanding officer of the 2nd Battalion, Yorkshire Regiment and served on the North West Frontier in India in 1897. He was made assistant adjutant general for Scottish District in 1898 and assistant military secretary at Army Headquarters in October 1899, taking over from Colonel Arthur Wynne's absence. The appointment became permanent soon after.

Franklyn was appointed a Companion of the Order of the Bath in the 1902 Coronation Honours published on 26 June 1902, and received the decoration from King Edward VII at Buckingham Palace on 24 October 1902.

Franklyn became commander of 10th Infantry Brigade with the temporary rank of brigadier general on 15 October 1902. The brigade was based at Shorncliffe Army Camp, serving with the 5th Division within the II Army Corps. Reverting to his substantive rank of colonel, he was appointed director of personal services at the War Office in March 1904, general officer commanding, 4th Division in 1906, general officer commanding, 3rd Division in 1907, and after being promoted to lieutenant general on 31 August 1910, was military secretary in 1911. He was advanced to a Knight Commander of the Order of the Bath in June 1912.

In 1914 he was appointed Governor of Malta, despite his lack of war experience, but never took up the appointment. He died later that year, shortly after the outbreak of the First World War, and was buried in Paddington Old Cemetery, London.

Franklyn was given the colonelcy of the Alexandra, Princess of Wales's Own (Yorkshire Regiment) in October 1906, a position he held until his death in October 1914.

== Personal life ==
In 1881, Franklyn married Helen Williams, daughter of Edwin Williams, with whom he had two sons and a daughter. He was the father of General Sir Harold Franklyn (1885–1963) and Brigadier Geoffrey Franklyn (1889–1967). His daughter, Dorothy Hope Franklyn (1883–1929), married George Edward Mervyn Thorneycroft and was the mother of politician Lord Thorneycroft.

Military offices
Preceded by Charles Knox	GOC 4th Division; 1906–1907	Succeeded by Herbert Belfield
Preceded by Sir Arthur Wynne	Military Secretary; 1911–1914	Succeeded by Sir Alfred Codrington
Honorary titles
Preceded by William Spencer Cooper	Colonel of Alexandra, Princess of Wales's Own (Yorkshire Regiment); 1906–1914	Succeeded by Sir Edward Bulfin
