= Geoffrey Franklyn =

British Army officer

Brigadier Geoffrey Franklyn DSO MC
- Born: 26 August 1889
- Died: 1967 (aged 77−78)
- Relatives: Sir William Franklyn (father); Sir Harold Franklyn (brother)
- Military career
- Allegiance: United Kingdom
- Branch: British Army
- Rank: Brigadier
- Service number: 4463
- Unit: Royal Field Artillery
- Commands: 18th Infantry Division
- Conflicts: First World War; Second World War
- Awards: Distinguished Service Order; Military Cross; Mentioned in Despatches; Croix de Guerre (Belgium)

Brigadier Geoffrey Ernest Warren Franklyn, DSO, MC (26 August 1889 – 1967) was a senior British Army officer.

== Military career ==
Born the son of Lieutenant General Sir William Franklyn and Helen Williams, and educated at Rugby School, Franklyn was commissioned into the Royal Artillery on 23 December 1909. His service in the First World War was recognized when he was appointed a companion of the Distinguished Service Order in the 1919 Birthday Honours.

Franklyn was briefly Acting General Officer Commanding 18th Infantry Division in May 1940, based in the United Kingdom, during the Second World War.
