= Lionel Finch =

British Army officer

Major-General Lionel Finch CB DSO* OBE
- Born: 5 July 1888; Murree, Punjab, British India (now Punjab, Pakistan)
- Died: 23 October 1982 (aged 94); Petworth, Chichester, England
- Military career
- Allegiance: United Kingdom
- Branch: British Army
- Service years: 1908–1943
- Rank: Major-General
- Service number: 6925
- Unit: Queen's Royal Regiment (West Surrey)
- Commands: 18th Infantry Division; 1st Battalion, Lancashire Fusiliers; 13th (Service) Battalion, Cheshire Regiment
- Conflicts: First World War; Second World War
- Awards: Companion of the Order of the Bath; Distinguished Service Order & Bar; Officer of the Order of the British Empire; Mentioned in Despatches

Major-General Lionel Hugh Knightley Finch, CB, DSO & Bar, OBE (5 July 1888 – 23 October 1982) was a senior British Army officer.

== Military career ==
After being educated at Cheltenham College, Finch was commissioned into the 3rd Battalion, the Queen's (Royal West Surrey) Regiment on 1 July 1908. He served in the 2nd Battalion the Cheshire Regiment in the First World War and his actions during his capture and subsequent detention as a prisoner of war was recognised by his appointment as an Officer of the Order of the British Empire. He was awarded the Distinguished Service Order (DSO) in the 1917 New Year Honours. In September 1917 he was awarded a Bar to his DSO, with the citation reading:

For conspicuous gallantry and devotion to duty. Prior to an assault his battalion sustained considerable casualties. Undeterred by these losses, however, he drew up and rehearsed his plans for assembly with the greatest care. During the assault the battalion sustained further heavy casualties, but this officer led the survivors with brilliant initiative and the utmost gallantry in an attack upon an enemy strong point, which he captured, killing or taking prisoners all the garrison. He then pushed his outpost line out and got into touch with the battalions on his flank, making complete dispositions for his advance. He was badly wounded at the end of the day, having set a personal example of fearlessness and fine leadership to which the excellent performance of his battalion was largely due.

Finch, promoted in January 1918 to brevet major, went on to command the 13th (Service) Battalion of the Cheshire Regiment in the later stages of the war.

After attending the Staff College, Camberley, from 1924 to 1925. Finch became commanding officer of 1st Battalion the Lancashire Fusiliers in 1934. He went on to be Assistant Adjutant-General at the War Office in 1936, Deputy Director of Recruiting and Organisation at the War Office in 1939, and along with it came a promotion to the rank of major general, and Deputy Adjutant-General at the War Office in 1940. After that he briefly became General Officer Commanding (GOC) of the 18th Infantry Division in June 1940 before retiring in July.

Finch was appointed a Companion of the Order of the Bath on 1 July 1941. He retired to Sussex, where he died on 23 October 1982, at the age of 94.

== Bibliography ==
- Smart, Nick (2005). Biographical Dictionary of British Generals of the Second World War. Barnsley, South Yorkshire: Pen and Sword Books. ISBN 1844150496.

Military offices
Preceded by Ralph Eastwood	GOC 18th Infantry Division; June 1940	Succeeded by Merton Beckwith-Smith
