= Merton Beckwith-Smith =

British Army general (1890–1942)

Major-General Merton Beckwith-Smith DSO MC
- Beckwith-Smith, c. 1940
- Born: 11 July 1890; Chelsea, London, England
- Died: 11 November 1942 (aged 52); Karenko Concentration Camp, Taiwan
- Burial place: Sai Wan War Cemetery, Hong Kong
- Alma mater: Eton College; Christ Church, Oxford
- Military career
- Allegiance: United Kingdom
- Branch: British Army
- Service years: 1910–1942
- Rank: Major-General
- Nickname: "Becky"
- Service number: 18095
- Units: Coldstream Guards; Welsh Guards
- Commands: 18th Infantry Division (1940–1942); 1st Guards Brigade (1939–1940); 1st Battalion, Welsh Guards (1932–1934)
- Conflicts: First World War; Second World War
- Awards: Distinguished Service Order; Military Cross; Mentioned in Despatches (2); Croix de guerre (France)

Major-General Merton Beckwith-Smith, DSO, MC (11 July 1890 – 11 November 1942) was a senior British Army officer during both the First and Second World Wars.

== Early life and military career ==
Beckwith-Smith was born on 11 July 1890 at 24 Walton Street, Chelsea to stockbroker Beckwith Smith and Georgina Butler Moore.

His education took in Warren Hill School at Eastbourne, Eton and Christ Church, Oxford.

In August 1910 he was commissioned into the Coldstream Guards.

He served with the Guards throughout the First World War, eventually becoming a staff officer in the Guards Division. On 4 October 1914, while the 1st Guards Brigade was holding trenches opposite the German line at the River Aisne, Beckwith-Smith was ordered by Brigadier-General Charles FitzClarence to carry out a nighttime raid against a German position known as 'Fish Hook Trench'. This was the first British trench raid of the First World War. Beckwith-Smith was still just a lieutenant at the time and the raid was considered to be a striking success. On the front of the 1/Coldstream, just east of the Troyon factory road, the Germans had run out a sap, and it was decided to fill it in. At 8 P.M. a platoon of the battalion, led by Beckwith-Smith (who was wounded and subsequently received the Distinguished Service Order), crossing the hundred yards of No Man's Land, rushed the trench with the bayonet. The award of the DSO was reported in the Edinburgh Gazette on 13 November 1914,

Second Lieutenant Merton Beckwith Smith, 1st Battalion, Coldstream Guards. On the night of October the 4th, near Vendresse, with a party of 50 men, he attacked and carried with the bayonet the advanced. German trenches, disabling 20 of the enemy, and displayed great enterprise and coolness in this operation, in which he was wounded.

Now a captain, Beckwith-Smith was awarded the French Croix de Guerre in 1917. In the same year Captain Beckwith-Smith was awarded the Military Cross.

== Between the wars ==
After the war Beckwith-Smith commanded the Officers' Training Corps at the University of Oxford. While he was commanding the Officers' Training Corps, the university conferred on him an honorary degree of MA. He then attended the Staff College, Camberley from 1921 to 1922.

The Times recorded Beckwith-Smith's appointment as Officer Commanding the Welsh Guards Regiment and Regimental District from 1 October 1934. In his capacity as Lieutenant-Colonel commanding the Welsh Guards, Beckwith-Smith participated in the Royal Procession at the Trooping the Colour of 1936, and again the following year.

Beckwith-Smith was promoted to temporary brigadier in February 1938 and spent fourteen months serving in India in command of the Lahore Brigade.

== Second World War ==
=== France ===
In 1940, during the Second World War, he was given command of the 1st Guards Brigade, part of the British Expeditionary Force (BEF) sent to France in 1939/1940.

When Lord Gort was ordered home and was replaced by Harold Alexander, Beckwith-Smith succeeded him in command of the 1st Division.

He took part in the defence of the Dunkirk Perimeter, telling his officers,

We have been given the supreme honour of being the rearguard at Dunkirk. Go and tell your platoons the good news!

During the battle he also spoke to his men about how to deal with the Luftwaffe Stuka dive bombers, 'Stand up to them. Shoot at them with a Bren gun from the shoulder. Take them like a high pheasant. Give them plenty of lead. £5 to any man who brings one down.'

For his service in the Battle of France he was mentioned in dispatches.

After he was evacuated to England, Beckwith-Smith was given command of the Territorial 18th Infantry Division, which he trained in preparation for duty overseas.

=== Singapore ===
In early 1942, after many weeks at sea, Beckwith-Smith's division was landed at Singapore. Japanese forces invaded Singapore Island on 8 February. Because of the defensive strategy implemented by the Allied commander, Lieutenant-General Arthur Percival, most of the British 18th Division saw little or no action. Percival surrendered all British and Commonwealth troops at Singapore on 15 February, including Beckwith-Smith and his division.

He was reported just prior to capture as being 'quite undisturbed by the calamity, continuing his duties even when the roof of his headquarters was burning over his head.

Prior to his being sent to Formosa in August 1942, Beckwith-Smith sent a message to his men:

On my departure for Japan I wish to take what may be my last chance to thank all ranks of the 18th Division for their cheerful service and loyal support on many shores and seas during the two years I have had the honour to command the Division.

I regret I have been unable to lead you to the success in battle to which your cause and sacrifice is entitled, and although I leave you with a heavy heart, I carry with me many precious memories and a sense of comradeship such as could only have been inspired by the trials and disappointments which we have shared in the last few months.

Difficult days may still be ahead, but I know that the spirit which today animates all ranks of the Division will prevail and will form the corner-stone on which one day a just and lasting peace will be found.

God grant that day may not be long delayed and that we may soon meet again.

Meanwhile GOOD LUCK, HEADS UP, KEEP SMILING.

— (Sgd.) M. BECKWITH-SMITH Major-General. 18th August 1942

On 11 November 1942 Merton Beckwith-Smith died at Karenko Camp of diphtheria as a prisoner of war. A report in The Times reported that the official Japanese news agency said Colonel Robert Hoffman of the US Army was with him, along with other British generals, when he died. In 1946, the Imperial War Graves Commission (now the Commonwealth War Graves Commission) exhumed all the Taiwan prisoner of war remains and reburied them in the Sai Wan War Cemetery in Hong Kong.

== Personal life ==
Beckwith-Smith married Honor Dorothy Leigh on 14 March 1918 at St George's Church, Hanover Square in Westminster. He lived at the Manor House, Stratton Audley.

== Bibliography ==
- Felton, Mark (2008). The Coolie Generals. Barnsley, South Yorkshire: Pen and Sword Books. ISBN 978-1-84415-767-9.
- Joslen, H. F. (2003) [1960]. Orders of Battle: Second World War, 1939–1945. Uckfield, East Sussex: Naval and Military Press. ISBN 978-1-84342-474-1.
- Keogh, Eustace (1962). Malaya 1941–42. Melbourne: Printmaster. OCLC 6213748.
- Smart, Nick (2005). Biographical Dictionary of British Generals of the Second World War. Barnsley, South Yorkshire: Pen and Sword Books. ISBN 1844150496.
- Smith, Colin (2005). Singapore Burning. Penguin. ISBN 978-0-670-91341-1.
- Snape, Michael (2023). Forgotten Warrior: The Life and Times of Major-General Merton Beckwith-Smith 1890-1942. Pen and Sword Books. ISBN 978-0281086917.

Military offices
Preceded by Lionel Finch	GOC 18th Infantry Division; 1940–1942	Captured by the Japanese
