= Thomas Dalby =

British Army general (1880–1963)

Major-General Thomas Dalby CB DSO
- Born: 13 January 1880; London, Middlesex, England
- Died: 14 March 1963 (aged 83)
- Military career
- Allegiance: United Kingdom
- Branch: British Army
- Service years: 1899–1937; 1939
- Rank: Major-General
- Service number: 22544
- Unit: King's Royal Rifle Corps
- Commands: 18th Infantry Division; 3rd Infantry Brigade; 2nd Battalion, King's Royal Rifle Corps
- Conflicts: Second Boer War; First World War; Second World War
- Awards: Companion of the Order of the Bath; Distinguished Service Order; Mentioned in Despatches (4)

Major-General Thomas Gerald Dalby, CB, DSO (13 January 1880 – 14 March 1963) was a senior British Army officer who saw service in three conflicts.

== Military career ==
After being educated at Eton College and the Royal Military College, Sandhurst, Dalby was commissioned into the King's Royal Rifle Corps (KRRC) of the British Army on 5 April 1899.

He saw service during the Second Boer War, where he was wounded, later campaigned in Somaliland in 1904.

Dalby's service in the First World War was recognised when he was promoted to major on 1 September 1915 and awarded the Distinguished Service Order (DSO) in the 1917 New Year Honours. Additionally, he was mentioned in dispatches four and was wounded twice, and married in 1917.

Having been promoted in January 1919 to brevet lieutenant colonel, he was promoted to lieutenant colonel and became commanding officer (CO) of the 2nd Battalion, KRRC, on 26 May 1928.

After being promoted to colonel in June 1931, with seniority dated back to September 1922, became commander of the 3rd Infantry Brigade in 1931. He was appointed a Companion of the Order of the Bath in the 1936 Birthday Honours before retiring in 1937.

Dalby was briefly recalled to become the first General Officer Commanding 18th Infantry Division, which was then based in the UK, in September 1939 before returning to retirement in November 1939.

== Bibliography ==
- Smart, Nick (2005). Biographical Dictionary of British Generals of the Second World War. Barnesley: Pen & Sword. ISBN 1844150496.

Military offices
New command	GOC 18th Infantry Division; September–November 1939	Succeeded by Bernard Paget
