= 55th Infantry Brigade (United Kingdom) =

55th Brigade 55th Infantry Brigade
- Active: 1914–1919; 1939–1942
- Country: United Kingdom
- Branch: British Army
- Type: Infantry
- Size: Brigade
- Part of: 18th (Eastern) Division; 18th Infantry Division
- Engagements: First World War; Second World War

Commanders
- Notable commanders: Lionel Sadleir-Jackson; Tim Massy-Beresford

The 55th Infantry Brigade was an infantry brigade of the British Army that saw active service in both the First and the Second World Wars.

== First World War ==
The brigade was originally raised in 1914, as the 55th Brigade, in the First World War as part of Kitchener's New Armies and joined the 18th (Eastern) Division, serving with it throughout the war mainly on the Western Front from 1915 to 1918.

=== Order of battle ===
- 7th (Service) Battalion, Queen's (Royal West Surrey Regiment)
- 7th (Service) Battalion, Buffs (East Kent Regiment)
- 8th (Service) Battalion, East Surrey Regiment
- 7th (Service) Battalion, Queen's Own (Royal West Kent Regiment) (left February 1918)
- 55th Machine Gun Company, Machine Gun Corps (formed 13 February 1916, moved to 18th Battalion, Machine Gun Corps 16 February 1918)
- 55th Trench Mortar Battery (formed 17 June 1916)

== Second World War ==
The brigade was disbanded after the war in 1919. However, it was reformed as the 55th Infantry Brigade in 1939 in the Territorial Army shortly before the outbreak of the Second World War and joined the 18th Infantry Division. It remained in the United Kingdom on home defence and training duties, preparing for a possible German invasion which, fortunately, never arrived. The 55th Infantry Brigade, along with the rest of the 18th Division, was sent to Singapore in 1942 where it surrendered to the Imperial Japanese Army in the short but violent Battle of Singapore. The men of the brigade would spend the next three years as Japanese prisoners in harsh and degrading imprisonment.

=== Order of battle ===
- 1st Battalion, Cambridgeshire Regiment
- 2nd Battalion, Cambridgeshire Regiment (to 30 October 1939)
- 5th Battalion, Bedfordshire and Hertfordshire Regiment
- 1/5th Battalion, Sherwood Foresters (from 8 July 1940)
- 55th Infantry Brigade Anti-Tank Company (formed 9 October, disbanded 14 December 1940)

=== Commanders ===
- Brig. W.M. Ozanne
- Brig. T.H. Massey-Beresford

== Bibliography ==
- Bellis, Malcolm A. (1994). Regiments of the British Army 1939–1945 (Armour & Infantry). London: Military Press International. ISBN 0-85420-999-9.
- Bellis, Malcolm A. (1995). Regiments of the British Army 1939–1945 (Artillery). London: Military Press International. ISBN 0-85420-110-6.
- Joslen, H. F. (2003) [1960]. Orders of Battle: Second World War, 1939–1945. Uckfield, East Sussex: Naval and Military Press. ISBN 978-1-84342-474-1.
- Westlake, Ray (1986). The Territorial Battalions, A Pictorial History, 1859–1985. Tunbridge Wells: Spellmount.

\
