= 4th Battalion, Yorkshire Volunteers =

Battalion of the British Army's Territorial Army

4th Battalion (South Yorkshire), Yorkshire Volunteers 3rd/4th Battalion, Yorkshire Volunteers 3rd Battalion (Yorkshire Volunteers), Duke of Wellington's Regiment (West Riding)
- 4 YORKS
- Active: 1988–1999
- Country: United Kingdom
- Branch: British Army
- Type: Infantry
- Role: Home Defence
- Size: Battalion
- Part of: 54th (East Anglian) Infantry Brigade (Cold War); 15th (North East) Infantry Brigade (90s)
- Battalion HQ: Endcliffe Hall, Sheffield

The 4th Battalion, Yorkshire Volunteers (4 YORKS) was an infantry battalion of Yorkshire's only Territorial Army (TA) regiment, and existed for just around four years before amalgamating with another battalion of the Yorkshire Volunteers.

== Formation ==
On 1 January 1988, as part of the expansion of the TA, the 4th Battalion, Yorkshire Volunteers was formed to expand the TA presence in South Yorkshire. The new battalion's structure on formation was as follows:

- Battalion Headquarters, at Endcliffe Hall, Sheffield
- Headquarters (Sheffield Artillery Volunteers) Company, at Endcliffe Hall, Sheffield (formed 6 April 1986)
- A (Hallamshire) Company, in Barnsley (from D Coy, 3 YORKS)
- B (Sheffield Artillery Volunteers) Company, in Rotherham (from B Coy, 3 YORKS)
- C (York and Lancaster Regiment) Company, in Doncaster (from E Coy, 1 YORKS)
- D (Hallamshire) Company, in Endcliffe, Sheffield (formed 1 January 1987 from D Coy, 1 YORKS)
- E (York and Lancaster Regiment) (Home Service Force) Company, in Sheffield, Doncaster, Rotherham, and Barnsley

The new battalion was tasked with guarding the North Eastern ports as part of the also newly formed 54th (East Anglian) Infantry Brigade. On 17 January 1989 the battalion was redesignated as 4th Battalion (South Yorkshire), Yorkshire Volunteers with no changes in companies or locations.

== 3rd/4th Battalion, Yorkshire Volunteers ==
In 1992, as part of the Options for Change reform announced following the Dissolution of the Soviet Union, the battalion was amalgamated with the 3rd Battalion (West Yorkshire), Yorkshire Volunteers to form the new 3rd/4th Battalion, Yorkshire Volunteers. The following therefore occurred to the battalion's companies: Battalion Headquarters formed the HQ of the new battalion, HQ (Sheffield Artillery Volunteers) and D (Hallamshire) Coys amalgamated with HQ Company, 3rd Yorks to form HQ (Hallamshire) Coy, A (Hallamshire) Coy and B (Sheffield Artillery Volunteers) Coy amalgamated to form A (Sheffield Artillery Volunteers) Coy in Barnsley, and C (York and Lancaster Regiment) Coy became C Coy in the 8th (Yorkshire) Battalion, The Light Infantry. At the same time as the above changes, the Home Service Force was disbanded, and H Coy followed suite.

The new battalion had the following structure on formation:

- Battalion Headquarters, at Endcliffe Hall, Sheffield
- A (Sheffield Artillery Volunteers) Company, in Barnsley
  - Rifle Platoon, in Rotherham
  - Rifle Platoon, in Eastgate, Barnsley
- B (Duke of Wellington's Regiment) Company, in Halifax (from A and D Coys, 3 Yorks)
  - Rifle Platoon, in Keighley
- C (Duke of Wellington's Regiment) Company, in Huddersfield (from C Coy, 3 Yorks)

== 3rd Battalion, Duke of Wellington's Regiment ==
Just a year after the new battalion's formation, on 25 April 1993 the battalion was redesignated as 3rd Battalion (Yorkshire Volunteers), The Duke of Wellington's Regiment (West Riding). Following the battalion's redesignation, all companies with the '(Duke of Wellington's Regiment)' dropped the subtitle but remained at their position.

== Disbandment ==
In 1998, the TA was again reduced, this time with an emphasis on the reduction of the infantry and expansion of the armoured (yeomanry) and royal artillery (air defence elements). As part of this reorganisation, the infantry-heavy TA was significantly reduced, especially in the area of fire support. Another change was the formation of new Territorial Army Regiments. One of the new regiments was the East and West Riding Regiment, which became the successor to the TA in the following counties; East Riding of Yorkshire, West Yorkshire, and South Yorkshire.

As part of this change, the battalion headquarters was disbanded, HQ and A (Sheffield Artillery Volunteers) amalgamated as Fontenay Company (Duke of Wellington's Regiment), and B and C Companies amalgamated as Ypres Company (Duke of Wellington's Regiment). At this point the battalion lineage was ended.
