= 54th Infantry Brigade (United Kingdom) =

54th Brigade 54th Infantry Brigade 54th (East Anglia) Brigade
- Active: 1914-1919; 1939-1942; 1980-1995
- Country: United Kingdom
- Branch: British Army
- Type: Infantry
- Size: Brigade
- Part of: 18th (Eastern) Division; 18th Infantry Division
- Garrison/HQ: Prince William of Gloucester Barracks, Grantham

Commanders
- Notable commanders: William Heneker; Herbert Shoubridge

The 54th Infantry Brigade was an infantry brigade of the British Army that saw active service in both the First and Second World Wars.

== First World War ==
The brigade was originally raised in September 1914, as the 54th Brigade, in the First World War as part of Kitchener's New Armies and joined the 18th (Eastern) Division, serving with it throughout the war mainly on the Western Front from 1915 to 1918.

=== Order of battle ===
The 54th Brigade was constituted as follows during the war:

- 10th (Service) Battalion, Royal Fusiliers (City of London Regiment) (left October 1914)
- 11th (Service) Battalion, Royal Fusiliers (City of London Regiment)
- 12th (Service) Battalion, Royal Sussex Regiment (left February 1915)
- 12th (Service) Battalion, Duke of Cambridge's Own (Middlesex Regiment) (disbanded February 1918)
- 6th (Service) Battalion, Northamptonshire Regiment (from November 1914)
- 7th (Service) Battalion, Bedfordshire Regiment (joined February 1915)
- 2nd (Service) Battalion, Bedfordshire Regiment (from May 1918)
- 54th Machine Gun Company, Machine Gun Corps (formed 13 February 1916, moved to 18th Battalion, Machine Gun Corps 16 February 1918)
- 54th Trench Mortar Battery (formed 1 June 1915)

== Second World War ==
The brigade was disbanded in 1919 after the war. Reformed in 1939 in the Territorial Army (TA) as the 54th Infantry Brigade, it was part of the 18th Infantry Division. The brigade spent the early years of the Second World War in the United Kingdom on home defence and training duties, anticipating a German invasion. With the rest of the division, the brigade was sent to Singapore, under the command of Brigadier Edward Backhouse, in 1942 and, after the Battle of Singapore against the Imperial Japanese Army, surrendered along with the rest of the Singapore garrison. They became prisoners of the Japanese for the next three years in harsh and degrading treatment.

=== Order of battle ===
The 54th Brigade was constituted as follows during the war:

- 4th Battalion, Royal Norfolk Regiment
- 4th Battalion, Suffolk Regiment
- 5th Battalion, Suffolk Regiment
- 54th Infantry Brigade Anti-Tank Company (formed 7 November, disbanded 14 December 1940)

== Postwar ==
In the 1980s, the 54th Brigade was again active as 54th (East Anglia) Brigade, a Territorial Army regional brigade in the United Kingdom.

Structure in 1989:

  - 1st Battalion, Royal Highland Fusiliers - Light Role Infantry Battalion
  - Queen's Own Mercian Yeomanry (TA) - Armored Car Reconnaissance Regiment
  - 3rd Battalion, Worcestershire and Sherwood Foresters Regiment (TA) - Light Role Reserve Infantry Battalion
  - 3rd Battalion, Yorkshire Volunteers (TA) - Light Role Reserve Infantry Battalion
  - 4th Battalion, Yorkshire Volunteers (TA) - Light Role Reserve Infantry Battalion
  - 6th Battalion, Royal Anglian Regiment (TA) - Light Role Reserve Infantry Battalion

It was amalgamated with 49 Brigade and thus disbanded in 1995.
