= Adam Park Guild House =

Historical building in Singapore

Coordinates: 1°17′37.88″N 103°46′23.75″E

The Adam Park Guild House is located at Adam Park Estate is a historic house at the National University of Singapore. The estate was the site of fighting between British forces and the invading Japanese Army in February 1942, in the Battle of Singapore. On 12 February, the defending forces formed a final perimeter around the city. On that morning, British soldiers of the 1st Battalion, the Cambridge Regiment, took up positions in the Adam Park housing estate. The Battalion's headquarters was at house number 7. Since March 1987, 7 Adam Park has served as the Adam Park Guild House of the National University of Singapore Society.
