= Tim Massy-Beresford =

British Army officer (1896–1987)

Brigadier Tim Massy-Beresford DSO MVO MC
- Born: Tristram Hugh Massy-Beresford; 10 April 1896
- Died: 21 July 1987 (aged 91)
- Military career
- Allegiance: United Kingdom
- Branch: British Army
- Service years: 5871
- Rank: Brigadier
- Unit: Rifle Brigade (The Prince Consort's Own)
- Commands: 55th Infantry Brigade (1940–1942)
- Conflicts: First World War; North-West Frontier; Second World War: Fall of Singapore
- Awards: Distinguished Service Order; Member of the Royal Victorian Order; Military Cross

Brigadier Tristram Hugh "Tim" Massy-Beresford, DSO, MVO, MC (10 April 1896 – 21 July 1987) was a British Army officer who fought in the Second World War. He created "Massy Force", an unorthodox military unit to fight against the Japanese prior to the Fall of Singapore and to conduct a guerrilla campaign afterwards; he also led the funeral procession at the funeral of King George V.

== Military career ==
Massy-Beresford was educated at Eton College before entering the Royal Military College, Sandhurst, from which he was commissioned into the Rifle Brigade (The Prince Consort's Own). He served in France during the First World War, but was wounded badly in 1915 and was not able to rejoin his regiment until 1918; he earned a Military Cross, but was wounded again when a bullet passed through his chest, killing the man behind.

After the end of the war, Massy-Beresford was posted to the Dardanelles during the Chanak Crisis, a confrontation between Britain and Turkey in 1920. Afterwards, he was posted to the North-West Frontier (the border between British India and Afghanistan). In 1935, Massy-Beresford led the funeral procession of King George V, marching alone, ahead of the main column. He went on to serve at the Royal Military College of Canada, before returning to Britain early in the Second World War.

Massy-Beresford was posted to Changi, Singapore, in 1942, where he was surprised by the lack of preparations that had been made for the forthcoming Japanese invasion. He assembled a force of 2,000 men from the Cambridgeshire Regiment, Suffolk Regiment, and Sikh Regiment with the intention of mounting a defence, but his plans were twice countermanded by senior officers. By the fall of Singapore, Massy-Beresford felt that he could have evacuated the majority of the civilians, collected rainwater, and put up some defence against the Japanese, but the garrison was surrendered and Massy-Beresford was taken prisoner of war and taken to Taiwan and then to Moukden in China. He was liberated by the Russians in 1945 and sent home around the Pacific. He was awarded the Distinguished Service Order for his efforts in Singapore. He was promoted to permanent brigadier in June 1948, and served as aide-de-camp to King George VI in 1948, and retired in 1949.
