= Herbert Belfield =

British Army officer (1857–1934)

Lieutenant-General Sir Herbert Belfield KCB KCMG KBE DSO
- Born: Herbert Eversley Belfield; 25 September 1857; Dover, Kent, England
- Died: 19 April 1934 (aged 76); Marylebone, London, England
- Military career
- Allegiance: United Kingdom
- Branch: British Army
- Service years: 1876–1914
- Rank: Lieutenant-General
- Commands: 4th Division; 4th Infantry Brigade
- Conflicts: Fourth Anglo-Ashanti War; Second Boer War; First World War
- Awards: Knight Commander of the Order of the Bath; Knight Commander of the Order of St Michael and St George; Knight Commander of the Order of the British Empire; Distinguished Service Order; Mentioned in Despatches

Lieutenant-General Sir Herbert Eversley Belfield, KCB, KCMG, KBE, DSO (25 September 1857 – 19 April 1934) was a British Army officer who commanded the 4th Division from 1907 to 1911.

== Military career ==
Belfield was born in Dover, the son of Capt. William Belfield. Educated at Wellington College, Belfield was commissioned into the Royal Munster Fusiliers in 1876. He was promoted to captain on 20 May 1885, and to major on 1 February 1893. He took part in the Fourth Anglo-Ashanti War in 1895, and was promoted to lieutenant colonel on 25 March 1896 and to colonel on 18 December 1899.

With the outbreak of the Second Boer War (1899–1902), he was appointed inspector general of the Imperial Yeomanry and assistant adjutant-general to Lieutenant General Lord Methuen. From January 1902 he held the local rank of brigadier general on the staff in South Africa. He was mentioned in despatches on 23 June 1902 by Lord Kitchener, Commander-in-Chief in South Africa during the latter part of the war, and returned home in the SS Kinfauns Castle leaving Cape Town in early August 1902, after the war had ended. For his service in the early part of the war he was appointed a Companion of the Order of the Bath (CB) in the April 1901 South Africa Honours list (the award was dated to 29 November 1900; he only received the actual decoration from King Edward VII at Buckingham Palace on 24 October 1902). He was further awarded the Distinguished Service Order (DSO) in the October 1902 South Africa Honours list.

Belfield was appointed assistant adjutant general (AAG) for the 1st Army Corps on 11 December 1902. On 8 December 1903 he succeeded Major General Herbert Plumer as general officer commanding (GOC) of the 4th Infantry Brigade, then part of the 2nd Division of the 1st Army Corps, and was granted the temporary rank of brigadier general whilst employed in this role. He was made GOC 4th Division in 1907 before being promoted to lieutenant general in August 1912 and retiring in 1914. He was also colonel of the Duke of Wellington's Regiment from August 1909 to 1914.

In retirement Belfield became director of prisoner of war (POW) work, negotiating prisoner exchanges and improvements in the treatment of prisoners throughout the First World War. There is a chair dedicated to his memory at York Minster Stoneyard.

== Family ==
In 1882, he married Emily Mary Binney, eldest daughter of Rev. Hibbert Binney, the Bishop of Nova Scotia; she died a year later. In 1888, he married Evelyn Mary Taylor; they had two daughters.

Military offices
Preceded by William Franklyn	GOC 4th Division; 1907–1911	Succeeded by Thomas Snow
