= Bernard Paget =

British Army general (1887–1961)

General Sir Bernard Paget GCB DSO MC
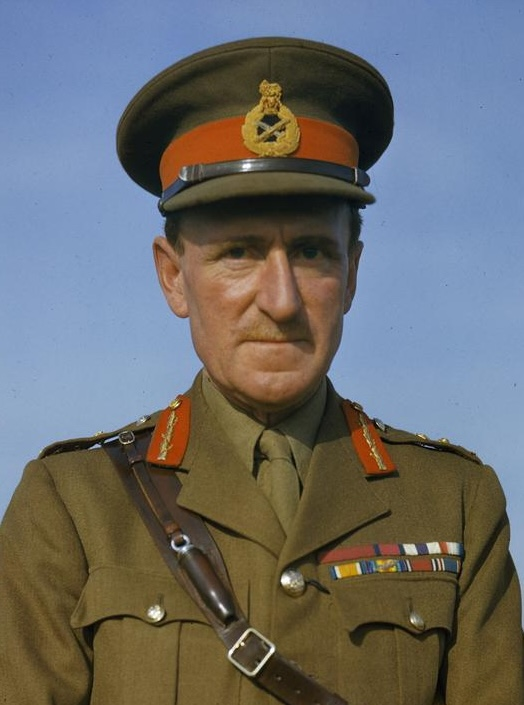
- Paget in 1942
- Born: 15 September 1887; Oxford, Oxfordshire, England
- Died: 16 February 1961 (aged 73); Petersfield, Hampshire, England
- Military career
- Allegiance: United Kingdom
- Branch: British Army
- Service years: 1907–1946
- Rank: General
- Nickname: "BP"
- Service number: 4112
- Unit: Oxfordshire and Buckinghamshire Light Infantry
- Commands: Middle East Command (1944–1946); 21st Army Group (1943); GHQ Home Forces (1941–1944); South-Eastern Command (1941); 18th Infantry Division (1939–1940); Staff College, Camberley (1938–1939); 4th Quetta Infantry Brigade (1936–1937)
- Conflicts: First World War; Second World War; Levant Crisis; Palestine Emergency
- Awards: Knight Grand Cross of the Order of the Bath; Companion of the Distinguished Service Order; Military Cross; Mentioned in Despatches; Silver Medal of Military Valor (Italy); Grand Cross of the Order of Polonia Restituta (Poland); Grand Officer of the Order of Leopold with Palm (Belgium); Croix de guerre with Palm (Belgium); Chief Commander of the Legion of Merit (United States); Knight Grand Cross of the Royal Order of St. Olav (Norway)
- Other work: Deputy Lord Lieutenant of Southampton (March 1960)

General Sir Bernard Charles Tolver Paget, GCB, DSO, MC (15 September 1887 – 16 February 1961) was a British Army officer who served with distinction in the First World War, and then later during the Second World War, when he commanded the 21st Army Group from June to December 1943 and was Commander-in-Chief (C-in-C) Middle East Command from January 1944 to October 1946. He was the senior serving general in the British Army and, in Richard Mead's words, "he was possibly the most talented and well-qualified senior British general never to have held a top active service field command, but his contribution to the development of the Army during the War was nevertheless immense."

== Early life and First World War ==
Paget was born in Oxford, the son of the Right Reverend Francis Paget, second son of Sir James Paget, 1st Baronet, and was educated at Shrewsbury School from 1901 to 1906 and at the Royal Military College, Sandhurst from 1906–1907. Paget was commissioned as a second lieutenant into the Oxfordshire Light Infantry on 13 November 1907, which became the Oxfordshire and Buckinghamshire Light Infantry (or shortened to OBLI or Ox and Bucks) in 1908. Paget was posted on 15 December 1907 to the 2nd Battalion, Oxfordshire Light Infantry (52nd) at Tidworth, Wiltshire. On 5 February 1908 he transferred to the 1st Battalion, Oxfordshire Light Infantry (43rd) at Lucknow, India. He was promoted to lieutenant on 19 November 1910.

On the outbreak of the First World War in August 1914 he was appointed adjutant of the new 5th (Service) Battalion of the Ox and Bucks stationed at Aldershot, composed mainly of volunteers for Kitchener's Army. After several months of training, Paget went with the battalion to the Western Front in May 1915. He was promoted to captain on 10 June 1915. The battalion was serving as part of the 42nd Brigade, itself part of the 14th (Light) Division. On 25 September 1915, Paget and his battalion took part in the Battle of Loos; he was one of only two officers in the battalion to survive the battle, out of a strength of seventeen, while out of 767 other ranks 180 returned. The other surviving officer was the battalion's commanding officer (CO), Lieutenant Colonel V. T. Bailey, who had been Paget's company commander at Sandhurst some years earlier. On 30 September 1915 he took over temporary command of the battalion while Bailey went on leave. He left the battalion to become the 42nd Brigade's brigade major on 20 November 1915. Paget was awarded the Military Cross (MC) in November 1915, and appointed a Companion of the Distinguished Service Order (DSO) in January 1918. The citation for his MC reads:

For conspicuous coolness and energy throughout the campaign in France. At Railway Wood, during a bomb attack by the enemy, following on the explosion of a mine, he rendered invaluable service in getting up bombers and bombs and organising working and wiring parties. His good services as Adjutant have been previously brought to notice.

He was mentioned in despatches four times, and wounded five times during the war, including in the left arm of which he never regained full use. Following being wounded on 26 March 1918 Paget was evacuated to the UK, where he became an instructor at the Staff College in Cambridge until the end of the war. Of the war Paget simply wrote, "The terrible slaughter of the Kaiser's War must never be allowed to happen again."

== Between the wars ==
The war ended in November 1918 and, during the interwar period, he remained in the British Army. Having been made brevet major in 1917, he was promoted to major in 1924 and brevet lieutenant colonel the following year. In 1920 he attended the Staff College, Camberley, and later returned there as an instructor from 1926 to 1928, where he taught a significant number of young officers who later achieved high rank. In 1929 he attended the Imperial Defence College in London, a clear sign that his star was on the rise. Paget was promoted to colonel that year, and became Commander of the depot at Cowley Barracks, Oxford in 1930. He initiated the founding of the regimental Chapel at Christ Church Cathedral, Oxford in 1930.

He was Chief Instructor at the Staff College, Quetta, British India (now the Command and Staff College, Pakistan), from 1932 to 1934. After serving at the War Office in London as a GSO1, from July 1934 until January 1937, Paget went to India to command the 4th Quetta Infantry Brigade from 1936 to 1937. He was promoted to major general on 22 January 1938, with seniority backdated to 29 December 1937. He succeeded Major General Sir Ronald Adam as commandant of the Staff College, Camberley, between 1938 and 1939.

== Second World War ==
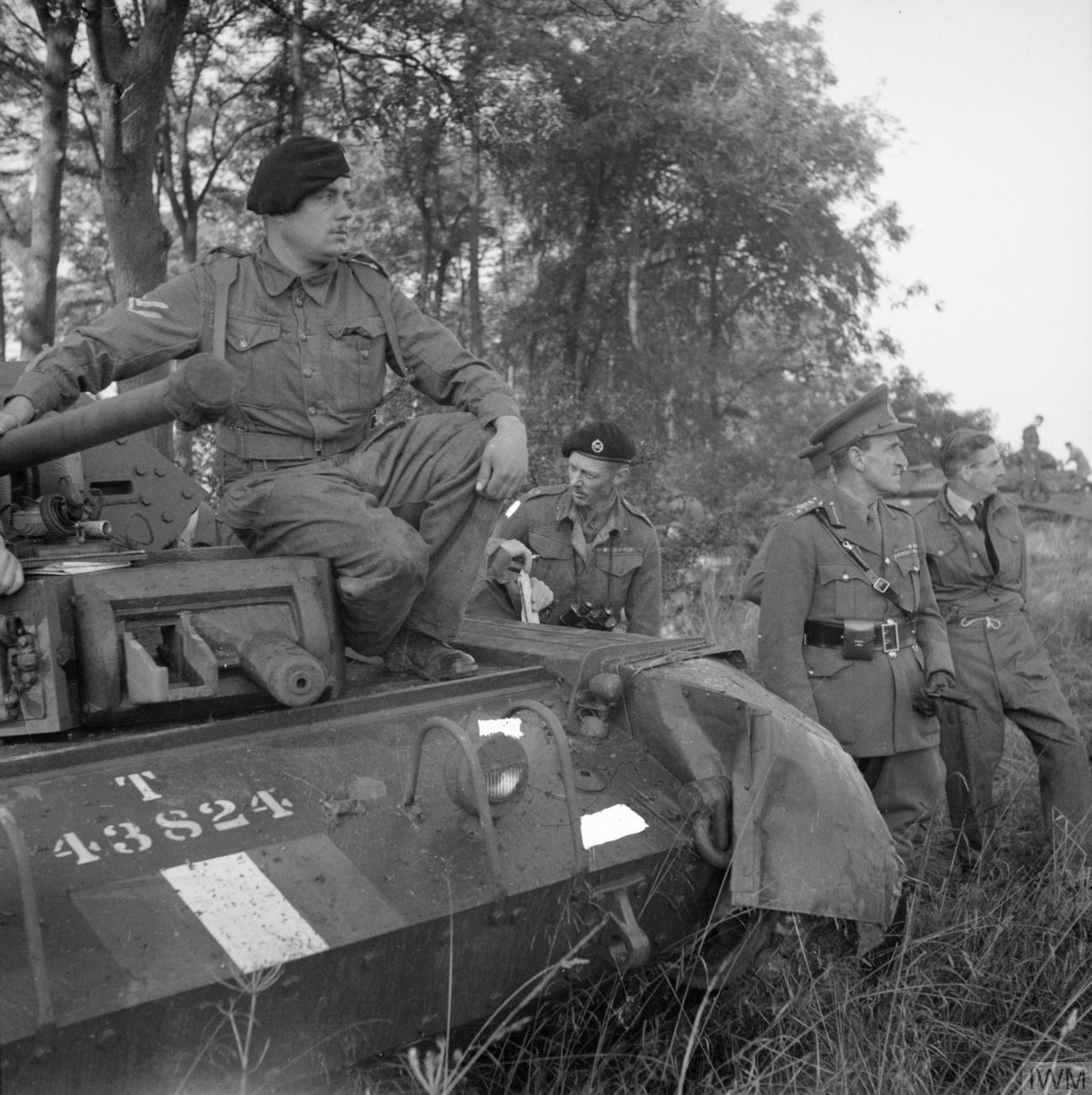
Paget and Anthony Eden, the Foreign Secretary, watch an exercise involving the 42nd Armoured Division near Malton, North Yorkshire, 29 September 1942. The tank in the foreground is a Crusader and to Paget's left is the GOC, Major General Miles Dempsey.

In late November 1939, nearly three months after the outbreak of the Second World War, Paget took over as General Officer Commanding (GOC) of the 18th Infantry Division, a recently raised Territorial Army (TA) formation, relinquishing command in mid-May 1940. In the acting rank of lieutenant general he commanded British forces in the withdrawal at Åndalsnes in Norway in 1940 during the disastrous Norwegian campaign, and was subsequently appointed a Companion of the Order of the Bath.

He was promoted to lieutenant general and made General Officer Commanding-in-Chief (GOC-in-C) of South-Eastern Command in February 1941. He was knighted as a Knight Commander of the Order of the Bath in the New Year's Honours' List at the end of the year. His new post controlled the part of the United Kingdom which was then widely considered to be the most likely target for any German invasion which, by the time of Paget's assumption of command, was still considered possible in the summer. South-Eastern Command had been split off from Eastern Command by Brooke; it covered the counties of Kent, Surrey and Sussex and controlled IV Corps, XII Corps and the Canadian Corps. XII Corps was commanded by Lieutenant-General Bernard Montgomery, who had been a fellow instructor at the Staff College in the 1920s. The two men managed to maintain a good working relationship, with Paget recognising Montgomery's expertise in tactics and the training of troops for battle.

In the final months of 1941 Paget was considered as a successor to Air Chief Marshal Sir Robert Brooke-Popham as Commander-in-Chief (C-in-C) of Far East Command although, fortunately for Paget in the light of later events, this never materialised. Around this time Churchill was growing tired of his Chief of the Imperial General Staff (CIGS), General Sir John Dill, and sought to replace him. At one point, Churchill considered Paget for the role, but it went to Brooke in the end, with Paget instead succeeding Brooke as C-in-C of Home Forces. Paget took up his position on Christmas Day while the Malayan campaign was being fought by British and Commonwealth forces against the Japanese and, had it not been for a twist of fate, Paget would have found himself there. He was promoted to the acting rank of general on the same date; this was made permanent in July 1943.

The entry of Japan into the war against the British posed numerous problems, but this was more than counterbalanced by the simultaneous entry into the war of the United States, with its enormous resources. It was now apparent that, for the British at least, the tide of the war was already beginning to turn by January 1942, with the arrival of American troops being only months away while German attention was distracted by their ongoing fight against the Soviet Union on the Eastern Front, which very much reduced the possibility of a German invasion of the British Isles. Despite this, it was obvious that, eventually, what soon became known as a Second Front would have to be opened, and that it would have to be mounted from Britain and would involve a huge military contribution. Thus, the mindset of the British and other Allied forces in the United Kingdom would have to change from a defensive posture to a more offensive-minded attitude.

Paget commanded the 21st Army Group in the United Kingdom from June to December 1943 prior to General Montgomery taking over. In January 1944 he became Commander-in-Chief (C-in-C) Middle East Command until October 1946, when he retired from the army. He was appointed as Extra Aide-de-Camp to King George VI in October 1944. Paget had been the longest serving Commander-in-Chief during the Second World War, and became the senior General in the British Army. In December 1944 he was awarded the Grand Cross of the Order of Polonia Restituta by the Polish government-in-exile. In 1946 he was advanced to Knight Grand Cross of the Order of the Bath.

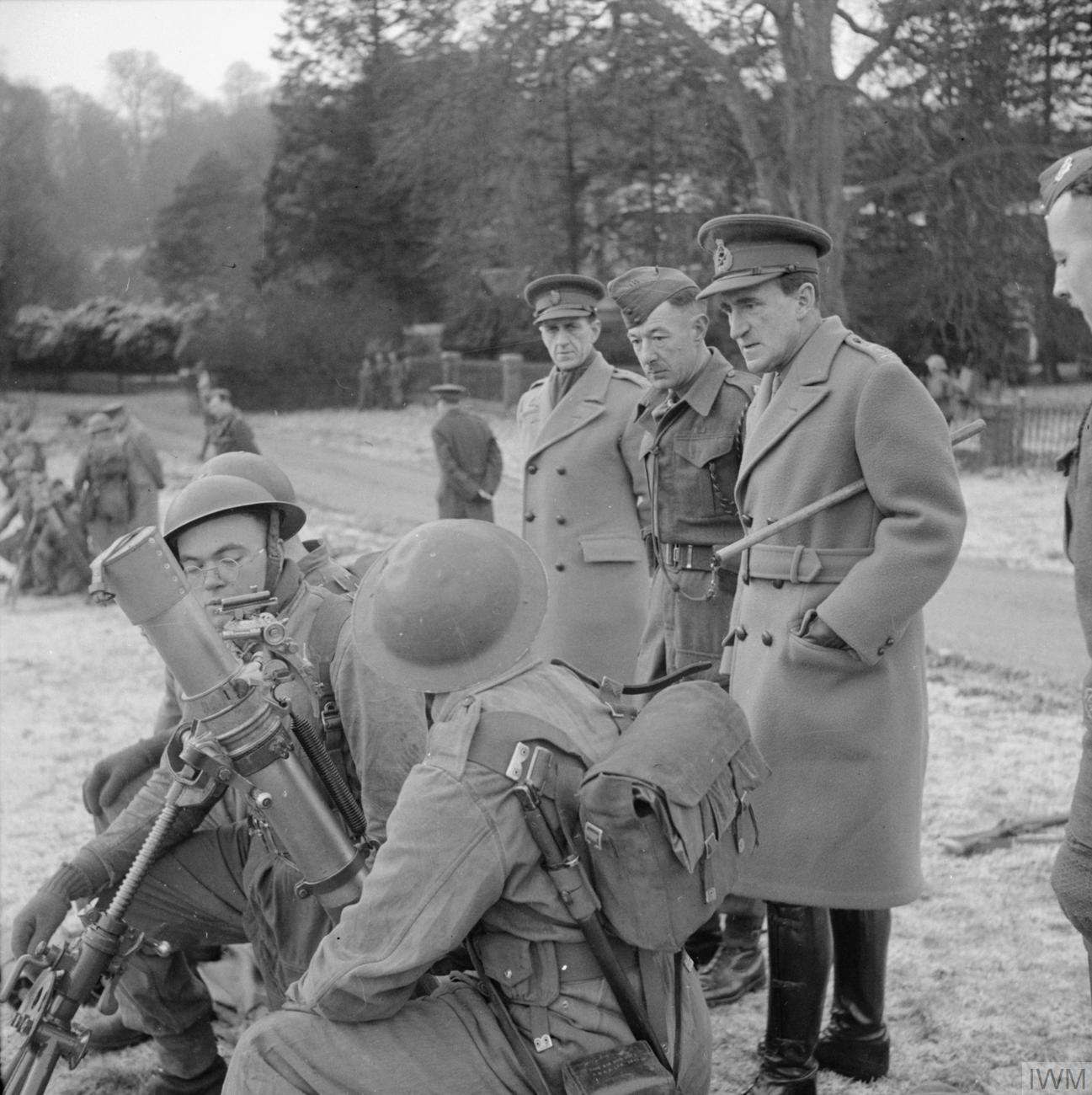
Paget, C-in-C Home Forces, inspecting a 3-inch mortar crew, 9 January 1943. Brigadier Maurice Chilton is second to the left of Paget.

His final act of World War II took place between May and July 1945 during the Levant Crisis: Paget under orders from Prime Minister Winston Churchill invaded Syria from Transjordan to curb French actions there, which he achieved at no cost. His forces escorted French troops to their barracks and the violence ceased.

After the war Paget was Colonel of the Oxfordshire and Buckinghamshire Light Infantry from October 1946 to September 1955 In May 1954, he presented new Queen's Colours to the regiment at Osnabrück. On 8 May 1955, he handed over the old Queen's Colours to the Dean of Christ Church Cathedral for safekeeping in a ceremony at Christ Church Cathedral, Oxford. He took his last salute from his regiment as Colonel Commandant at the parade to commemorate the bicentenary of the 52nd on 14 October 1955 at Osnabrück, West Germany. He was Colonel of the Intelligence Corps and Colonel of the Reconnaissance Regiment. He was Principal of Ashridge College of Citizenship from 1946 to 1949. He was a Governor of Radley College, Eastbourne College, St Edwards and Welbeck College. Paget was President of the Army Benevolent Fund. He was Governor of the Royal Hospital Chelsea from 1949 to 1956. He retired to Petersfield, Hampshire in 1957. He was appointed a Deputy Lieutenant of Hampshire in 1960. Paget was installed as a Knight Grand Cross of the Order of the Bath at a service in Westminster Abbey on 27 October 1960 and his Banner was hung in the Henry VII Chapel. He died soon afterwards of a heart attack on 16 February 1961, at the age of 73.

== Family ==
He married Winifred Nora Paget on 7 February 1918, with whom he had two sons. His younger son, Lieutenant Tony Paget, died on 5 March 1945 from wounds received while serving with the 1st Battalion, Oxfordshire and Buckinghamshire Light Infantry (the 43rd) during the Battle of the Reichswald. He was appointed a Companion of the Distinguished Service Order for his gallantry during the battle.

His elder son Sir Julian Paget, 4th Baronet served in the Army during the Second World War and until he retired in 1969, and then became a military historian.

Sir Bernard Paget Avenue, built on the former Templer Barracks army site in Ashford, Kent, is named after him.

== Bibliography ==
- Mead, Richard (2007). Churchill's Lions: a biographical guide to the key British generals of World War II. Stroud (UK): Spellmount. ISBN 978-1-86227-431-0.
- Smart, Nick (2005). Biographical Dictionary of British Generals of the Second World War. Barnesley: Pen & Sword. ISBN 1844150496.
- Paget, Julian (2008). The Crusading General: The Life of General Sir Bernard Paget GCB DSO MC. Pen & Sword Military. ISBN 978-18441-58102.

Military offices
Preceded by Sir Ronald Adam	Commandant of the Staff College, Camberley; 1938–1939	Succeeded by Robert Collins
Preceded by Thomas Dalby	GOC 18th Infantry Division; 1939–1940	Succeeded by Ralph Eastwood
New command	GOC-in-C South-Eastern Command; February–December 1941	Succeeded by Bernard Montgomery
Preceded by Sir Alan Brooke	C-in-C Home Forces; 1941–1944	Succeeded by Sir Harold Frankyn
New command	GOC-in-C 21st Army Group; June–December 1943	Succeeded by Sir Bernard Montgomery
Preceded by Sir Henry Wilson	C-in-C Middle East Command; 1944–1946	Post disbanded
Honorary titles
Preceded by Sir John Hanbury-Williams	Colonel of the Oxfordshire and Buckinghamshire Light Infantry; 1947–1955	Succeeded by Sir John Winterton
Preceded by Sir Clive Liddell	Governor, Royal Hospital Chelsea; 1949–1956	Succeeded by Sir Cameron Nicholson
