= Émile Ripert =

French academic, poet, novelist and playwright

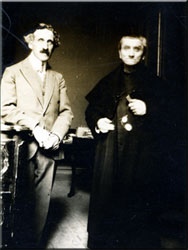
- Émile Ripert on the left, Louis Le Cardonnel on the right
- Born: Émile Louis Marie Adrien Ripert; 19 November 1882; La Ciotat, Bouches-du-Rhône, France
- Died: 23 April 1948 (aged 65); Marseille, Bouches-du-Rhône, France
- Education: École Normale Supérieure; University of Paris
- Occupations: Academic, poet, novelist, playwright
- Spouse: Adrienne Eugénie Gras
- Parent(s): Joseph Casimir Ripert; Marie-Louise Beranger

Émile Ripert (1882–1948) was a French academic, poet, novelist and playwright. He served as the inaugural Chair of Provençal Language and Literature at Aix-Marseille University. He was the author of three novels, four poetry collections, three plays and five non-fiction books about Provençal culture.

== Early life ==
Émile Ripert was born on 19 November 1882 in La Ciotat near Marseille in Provence. His father was Joseph Casimir Ripert and his mother, Marie-Louise Beranger. His paternal grandfather came from Cadenet in Vaucluse.

Ripert graduated from the École Normale Supérieure. He completed a PhD from the University of Paris.

== Career ==
Ripert began his career as a teacher in Toulon, followed by Marseille. He was appointed as the first-ever Chair of Provençal Language and Literature at Aix-Marseille University in Aix-en-Provence in 1920.

Meanwhile, Ripert published poetry collections as early as 1908. He published a travel narrative in 1925, and several plays from 1933 onward. He also published some novels.

Ripert was inducted into the Académie de Marseille in 1916, replacing Frédéric Mistral. At Mistral's funeral in 1914, Ripert had praised Giuseppe Bottai, a Fascist politician. Moreover, Ripert was part of an official delegation to Fascist Italy alongside Jean Rivain, Philippe de Zara, Rémy Roux and Marius Jouveau.

== Personal life and death ==
Ripert married Adrienne Eugénie Gras on 25 April 1908. His father-in-law, Dr Evariste Gras, served as the mayor of La Ciotat.

Ripert died on 23 April 1948 in Marseille.

== Works ==
=== Poetry ===
- Ripert, Emile (1908). Le Golfe d'amour. Paris: Edition du Feu. OCLC 464984759.
- Ripert, Emile (1912). La terre des lauriers. Paris: Grasset. OCLC 860307360.
- Ripert, Emile (1926). Le poème d'Assise. Paris: Spès. OCLC 370685152.
- Ripert, Emile (1929). Le Train bleu. Paris: Flammarion. OCLC 918026088.

=== Novels ===
- Ripert, Emile (1921). L'or des ruines. Paris: La Renaissance du livre. OCLC 10768856.
- Ripert, Emile (1925). Le double sacrifice. Paris: Editions de la France vraie. OCLC 300096518.
- Ripert, Emile (1930). Mireille des amours. Paris: Editions Spes. OCLC 2792393.

=== Plays ===
- Normand, Jacques; Ripert, Emile (1934). Le Roi René. Aix-en-Provence: Editions du Feu. OCLC 313280664.
- Mignon, Maurice; Ripert, Emile (1937). Laure et Pétrarque. Paris: Éditions Billaudot. OCLC 7620352.
- Picard, Gaston; Ripert, Emile (1939). La Marseillaise. Paris: Les Éditions Denoël. OCLC 19000330.

=== Non-fiction ===
- Ripert, Emile (1918). La Renaissance provençale : (1800-1860). Paris: E. Champion. OCLC 6574586.
- Ripert, Emile (1918). La Versification de Frédéric Mistral. Paris: Champion. OCLC 2334469.
- Ripert, Emile (1924). Le Félibrige. Paris: A. Colin. OCLC 2584821.
- Ripert, Emile (1929). La Provence: Choix de textes précédés d'une étude. Paris: H. Laurens. OCLC 1972530.
- Ripert, Emile (1931). La Côte vermeille et le Languedoc méditerranéen. Grenoble: B. Arthaud. OCLC 489831877.
- Ripert, Emile (1937). Louis Le Cardonnel. Ses derniers moments. Ses obsèques. Avignon-Valence. Avignon: Maison Aubanel père. OCLC 9652132.
