= Frederick Lewis Taylor =

English abbot (1892–1961)

Personal life
- Born: 28 March 1892
- Died: 31 July 1961 (aged 69)

Religious life
- Religion: Christianity
- Order: Benedictines
- Church: St Augustine's Abbey

Senior posting
- Post: Abbot
- Period in office: 8 August 1934 – 1954
- Predecessor: Erkenwald Egan
- Reason for exit: ill health

Frederick Lewis Taylor, MA, MC (London, 28 March 1892 – Pallatine Road, Stoke Newington, Cheam, 31 July 1961) was the fourth Abbot of the Benedictines of Saint Augustine's in Ramsgate. The Benedictines of Ramsgate are part of the English Province of the Subiaco Cassinese Congregation. Taylor was a historian educated at Cambridge, author of The Art of War in Italy, 1494-1529. He was a WW1 veteran, having served with the 17th Royal Fusiliers, he was invalided out of the army on 24 March 1918.

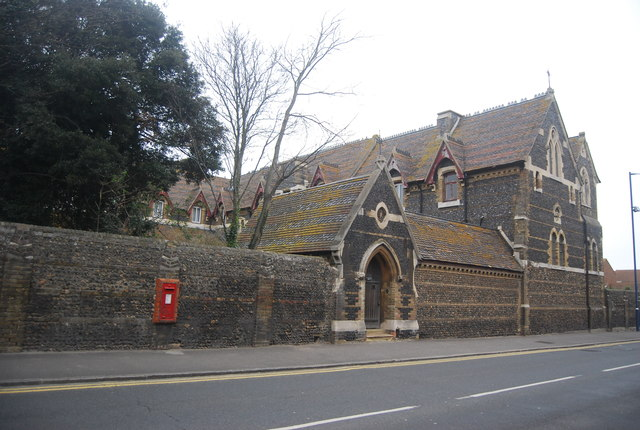
St Augustine's Abbey, Ramsgate

== Family ==
F.L. Taylor was the son of Lewis Charles Taylor and (French-born) Camille Soulard. His father Lewis was a compositor, and worked for Dent & Sons. F.L. Taylor's paternal grandfather, George Gee Taylor was a printer. His paternal great-grandfather, Charles Gee Taylor, was a Wesleyan Methodist lay preacher, inventor of pills and ointments and patent medicine vendor.

F.L. Taylor's older brother, William George Taylor (Holborn, 17 October 1885, Welwyn Garden City, 4 July 1967), was secretary and manager of Dent & Sons. His elder sister Cécile Marie Taylor (Holborn, 18 November 1887, London, 16 July 1972) was Prioress of the Servite Sisters at Beccles, Stratton, Bognor Regis and Chelmsford. Her religious name was Electa. F.L. Taylor's younger sister was Camille L. (Marie) Taylor (London, 4 December 1889, Roxley Court Care Home, Letchworth), 5 September 1971), she was a telegraph operator.

== Education and academic career ==
Taylor was educated at Hackney Downs School, London, founded as the Grocers' Company School in 1876.

Ramsgate, Kent, UK

Taylor studied history at Cambridge University, at St John's College. He was awarded an MA degree in 1920 with his essay/dissertation "The Art of War in Italy, 1494-1529 about the Italian wars, with an appendix on the Battle of Ravenna (1512). He won the Prince Consort Prize for this essay in 1920. The Prince Consort Prize was awarded in alternate years with the Thirlwall Prize, which has been awarded only in odd-numbered years. With the Prize he had his essay published by Cambridge University Press in 1921.

== Academic work ==
- "The Art of War in Italy, 1494-1529". Researchgate.

== Military career ==
Taylor served as a soldier and officer in World War I. He enlisted in September 1914 with the University and Public School Battalion 18th Royal Fusiliers (1st Public school) and trained in B Company. He embarked to France on 17 November 1915 in 33 Division, 19th Brigade, 18 Royal Fusiliers, B Company. On 26 February 1916 his battalion was added to the General Headquarter Troops and soon thereafter disbanded. Shortly after the 18th Battalion, 1st UPS RF had been disbanded, he was commissioned for the Officers' Training Corps at Oxford, where he was trained to be an officer for 4 months. By November 1916 he returned to the battlefield in France as second Lieutenant of the 17th Royal Fusiliers as part of the Fifth New Army, 2nd Division, 5th Brigade. He commanded the B-Company. By Easter 1917 he took part in the capture of Beaumont Hamel in November 1917. He shortly afterwards was on leave in the UK. He received a Military Cross Medal for his action with his 17th RF in the Battle of Arras in April 1917.

Taylor was shot in his throat during the "Grey Avalanche", the German Spring Offensive, on 24 March 1918, where he acted as Captain. He was invalided out of the army on 28 April 1918.

== Religious career ==
Taylor entered St Augustine's as a novice in July 1920. He took the religious name Adrian. He made his vows four years later in 1924. He became headmaster of the Abbey School in 1924. Taylor was elected abbot of St Augustine's Abbey in Ramsgate on 8 August 1934. He succeeded Abbot Erkenwald Egan, who resigned at the age of 79 after 25 years of office. Abbot Adrian Taylor was blessed on Friday 21 September 1934.

As Abbot he had to evacuate his Abbey School to Hemingford Grey (Huntingdonshire) at the outbreak of World War II, due to German raids on Ramsgate. In 1952 he opened a Junior Day School again in Ramsgate at the Grange.

Taylor resigned as Abbot of Ramsgate in 1954 due to ill health after a dispute in his community about policy. He retired to St Michael's Abbey in Farnborough where he spent his last years. He became Titular Abbot of Reculver. He died of coronary thrombosis in 1961.

== See also ==
- St Augustine's Abbey, Chilworth
- The Grange, Ramsgate

== Books ==
- Taylor, Frederick Lewis, the Art of War in Italy 1494-1529, Cambridge University Press, 1921.
- Parry, David, O.S.B., Monastic Century, St Augustine's Abbey 1861-1961, Fowler Wright Books Ltd 1965, Monastery Press Ramsgate.
- Parry, David, O.S.B., Scholastic Century, St Augustine's Abbey School 1865-1965, Fowler Wright Books Ltd, 1965, Monastery Press Ramsgate
- Wyrall, Everard, The 17th (S.) Battalion Royal Fusiliers, 1914-1919. London: Methuen, 1930.
