= Saint Cydroine Church =

Church located in Yonne, France

- Église Saint-Cydroine
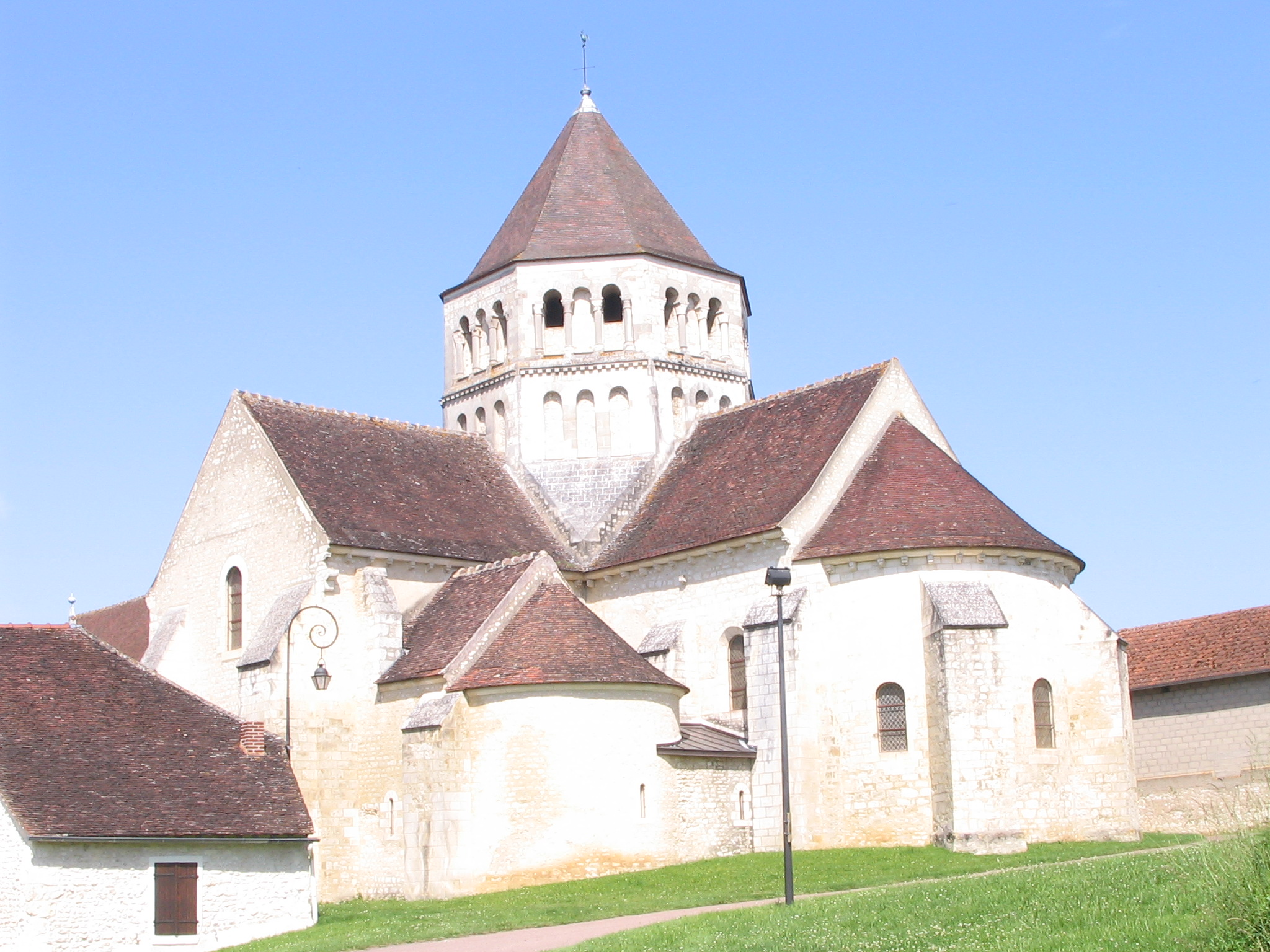

- Location in France

Religion
- Sect: Catholic Church
- Province: Yonne
- Region: Bourgogne-Franche-Comté
- Governing body: Archdiocese of Sens-Auxerre, Christ-Roi parish
- Year consecrated: 11th century

Location
- Municipality: Laroche-Saint-Cydroine
- Country: France
- Interactive map of Saint Cydroine Church
- Coordinates: 47.9672°N 3.46645°E

Architecture
- Style: Romanesque
- Designated as NHL: Classé MH (1905)

The Saint Cydroine Church (French: Église Saint-Cydroine) is a Romanesque church dating from the eleventh and twelfth centuries. It is among the oldest in the Yonne department, located in the town of Laroche-Saint-Cydroine in France.

It was originally an abbey church of a Benedictine priory depending on the abbey of La Charité-sur-Loire. It is dedicated to Saint Cydroine, a 4th-century Roman Christian martyr beheaded by the Romans on the site of the building. (Note: Rue Paul Boursin à Laroche-Saint-Cydroine.) Its two-storey octagonal bell tower and the sculptural decoration of its capitals make it one of the masterpieces of Romanesque art of the icaunais. (Note: Icaunais: name given to the inhabitants of the Yonne department.) It has been classified as a historical monument since 1905.

== History ==
The present church was probably built in the eleventh century at the top of a hill overlooking the right bank of the Yonne River. It is on the site of the martyrdom of Saint Cydroine and replaced a primitive abbey church, cited in the Sacramentary as a parish from the ninth century, for use by the Abbey of Saint-Amand. The priory then belonged to the monks of the abbey of Saint-Rémi de Sens who ceded it to the Benedictine monastery of La Charité-sur-Loire. This belonged to the Order of Cluny. A first mention of the priory dates from 1162 in a pontifical act where Pope Alexander II settled a neighborhood dispute between the Benedictine monks of La Charité-sur-Loire who lived there and the Premonstratensians of Dilo.

Some of the oldest elements (bell tower, choir and transept) in Romanesque style can be dated to the end of the 11th century, while the nave and other later elements date from the 12th century and the 13th century.

== Architecture ==
=== Exterior ===
The tower is octagonal straddling the transept.

=== Interior ===
The plan in a Greek cross and three circular apses:

- Length of the nave: 48 metres (157 ft)
- Width of the nave: 8.85 metres (29.0 ft)
- Width at the sanctuary: 6.15 metres (20.2 ft)
- Height of the vault of the nave: 10.60 metres (34.8 ft)
- Height of the sanctuary: 8.20 metres (26.9 ft)

== Sculpture ==
The Romanesque interior decor is original, with elephants on the capitals, exotic trees, cats, chimaeras etc.

== Gallery ==
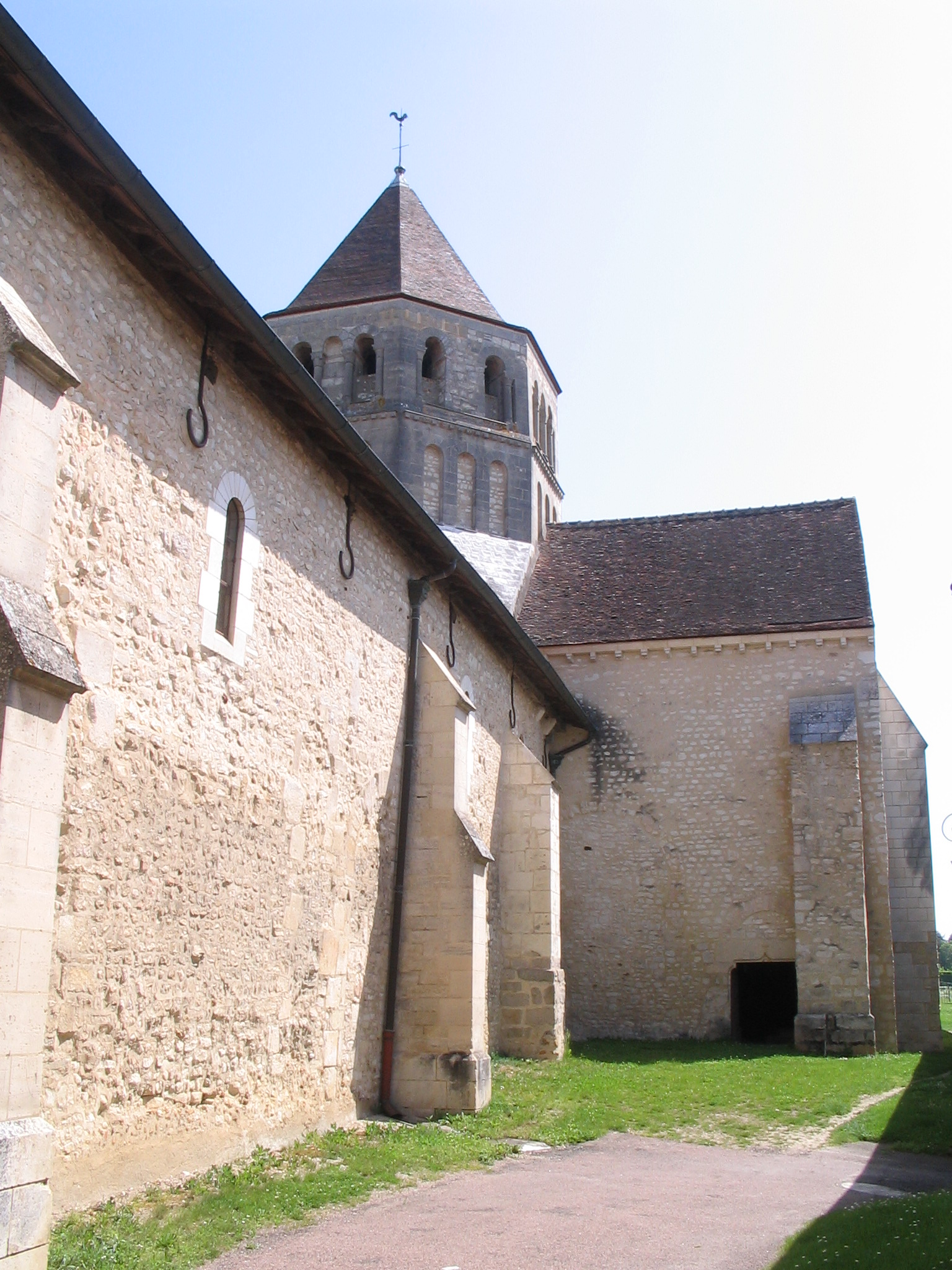
Detail of the church

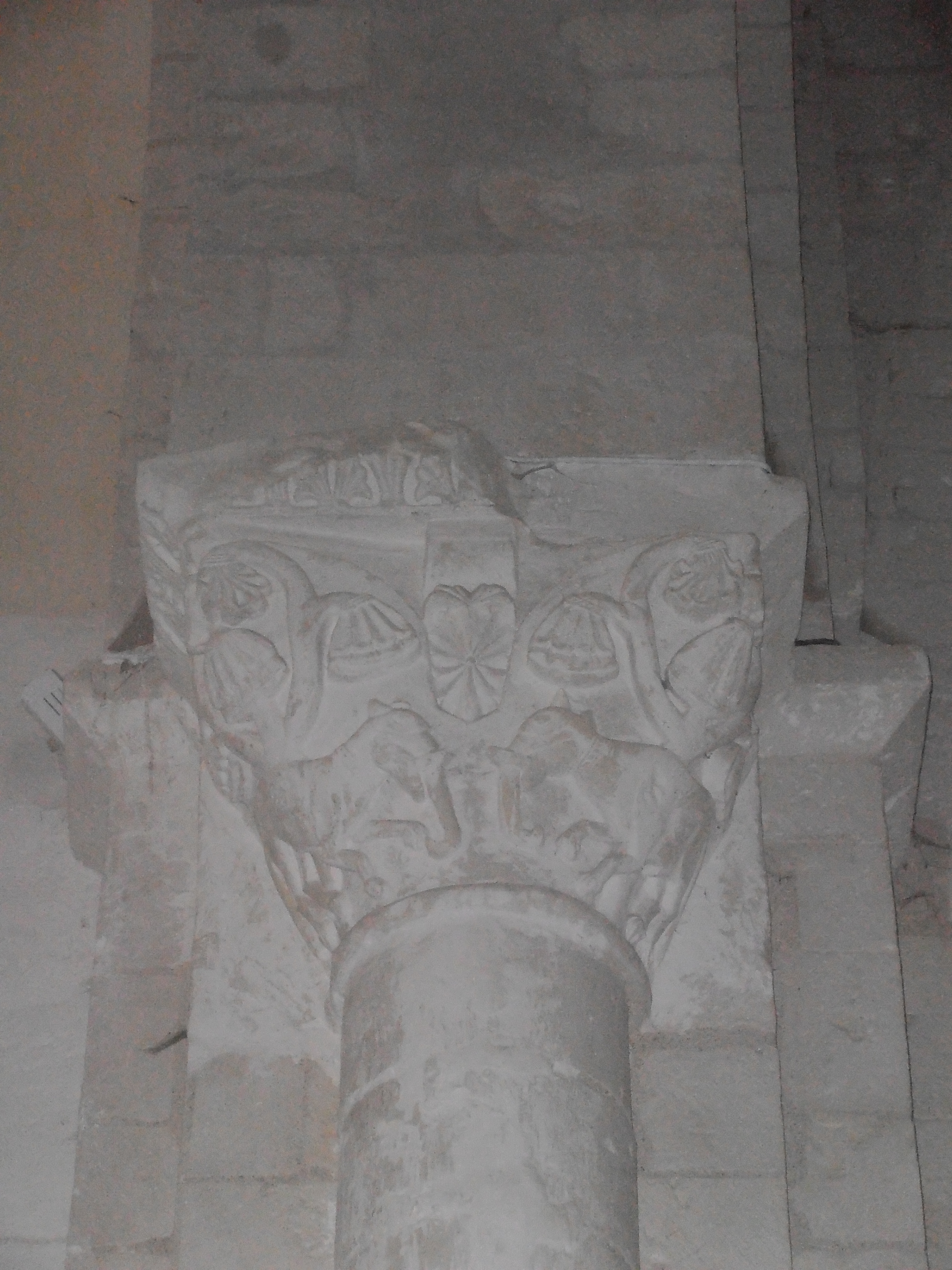
Capital with lions' heads

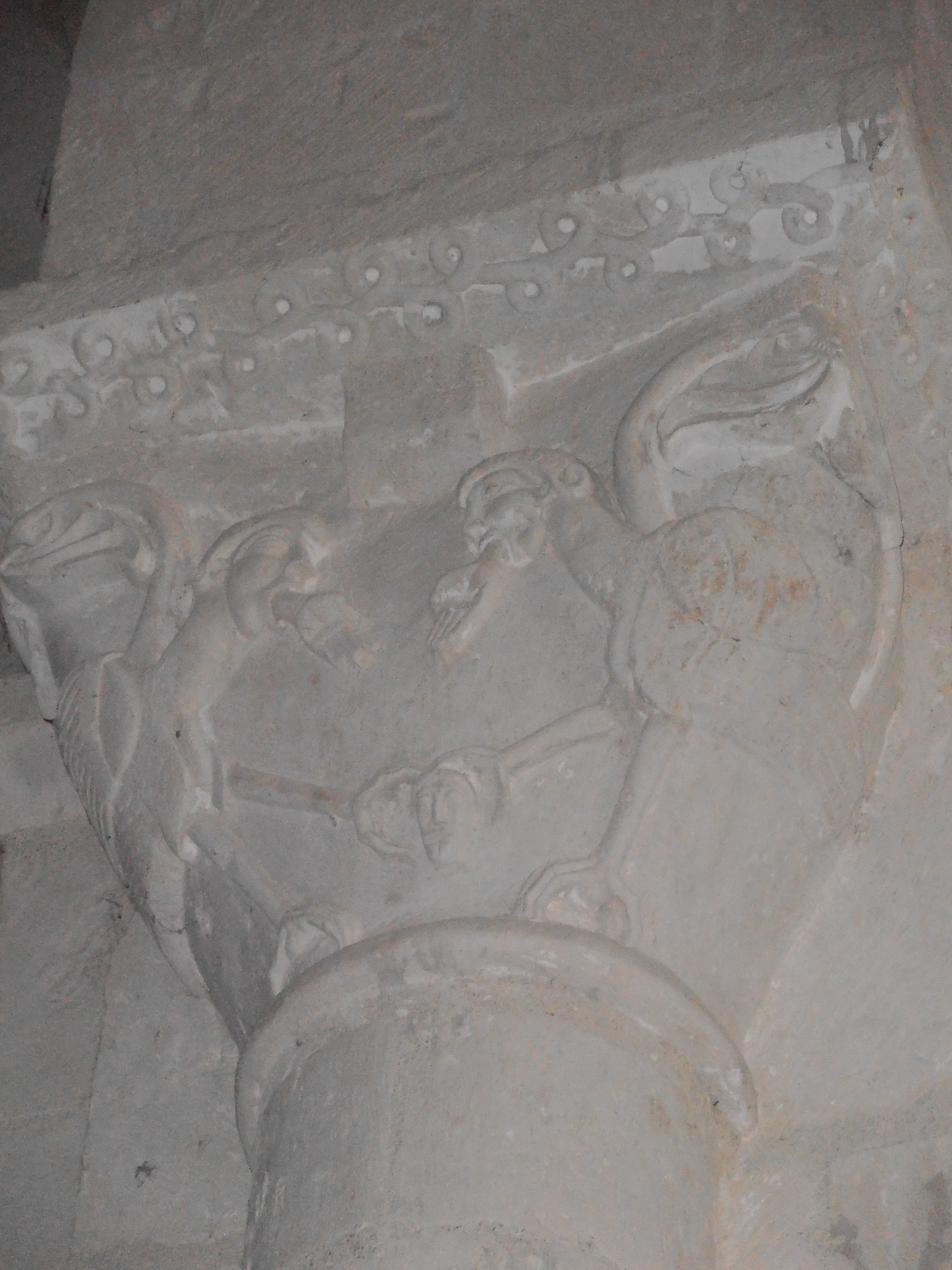
Capital with birds' heads

== Sources ==
- Hohl, Claude (1978), Églises romanes de l'Yonne, Les cahiers des Archives n°1 (in French), Auxerre: Archives départementales de l'Yonne, p. 55
- Delasselle, Claude (2003), Les églises romanes de l'Yonne, Dossiers du service éducatif n°26 (in French), Auxerre: Archives départementales de l'Yonne, p. 67
- Moreau, Abel, Églises de l'Yonne, Art et Tourisme (in French), Paris: Nouvelles Éditions latines, p. 32
- de la Torre, Michel (1990), "Laroche-Saint-Cydroine", Yonne, le guide complet de ses 451 communes, Villes et villages de France (in French), Paris: Deslogis-Lacoste, p. 115, ISBN 2-7399-5089-6
