= Saint Sidronius =

- Died: c. 270; Rome
- Feast: 8 September or 11 July

Saint Sidronius (died c. 270) was a Roman martyr. His life is confused with a French saint of the same name. His feast date is 8 September or 11 July.

== Church ==
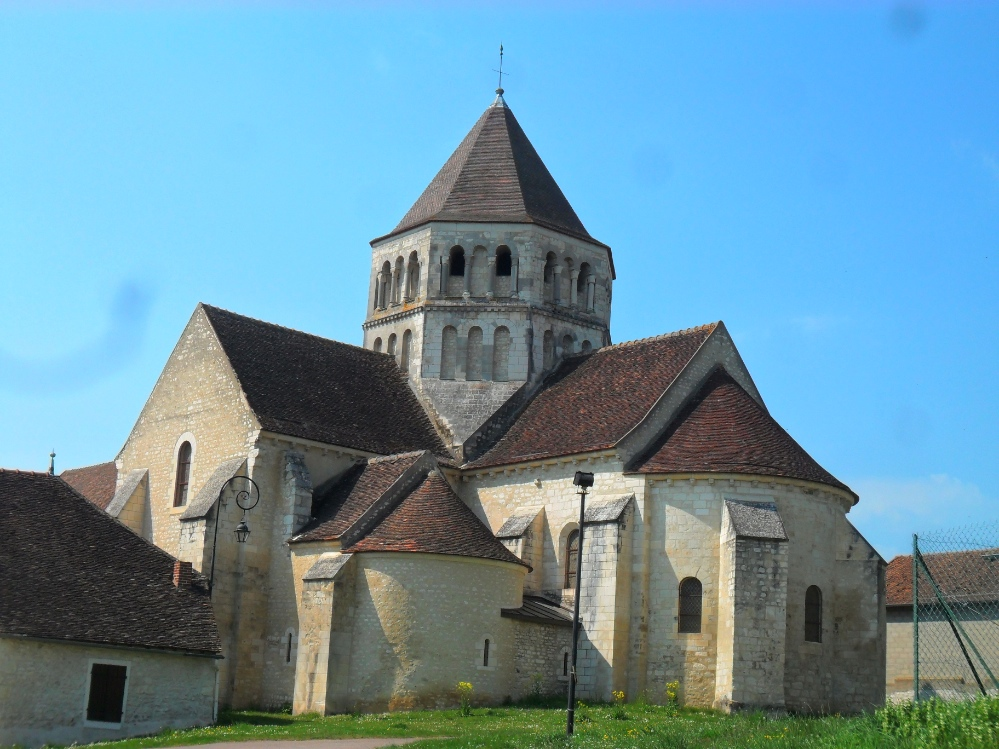
Église Saint-Cydroine, Yonne

The village of Saint-Cydroine in the commune of Laroche-Saint-Cydroine near Sens in Yonne, France, is named after the saint. It is said that Sidronius was martyred here by the Romans, and a spring here with miraculous powers was a place of pilgrimage in the Middle Ages. The Saint Cydroine Church is an 11th- or 12th-century Romanesque church with an octagonal tower in the village dedicated to the saint. It was founded by the abbey of La Charité-sur-Loire.

== Monks of Ramsgate account ==
The Monks of Ramsgate wrote in their Book of Saints (1921),

SIDRONIUS (St.) M. (July 11)
(3rd cent.) A Martyr of this name suffered in Rome under the Emperor Aurelian (A.D. 270 about). His relics were in the middle ages translated into Flanders. Another St. Sidronius is venerated at Sens in France. The history of the one and of the other is confused, and the particulars drawn from tradition are unreliable.

== Baring-Gould's account ==
Sabine Baring-Gould (1834–1924) wrote in his Lives of the Saints (1897),

[Roman, Gallican, and Belgian Martyrologies. Authority : The apocryphal Acts composed in Flanders in 1062]

In 1062, Adela, wife of Baldwin the Pius, count of Flanders, translated the bones of S. Sidronius from Rome to Messines, south of Ypern, in Flanders. About this time, Acts of the Saint were fabricated : they are full of absurdities, and do not deserve further notice. The church of Sens, in France, however, claimed also to possess the relics of this martyr.

== Butler's account ==
The hagiographer Alban Butler (1710–1773) wrote in his Lives of the Primitive Fathers, Martyrs, and Other Principal Saints, under April 9,

St. Sidronius, M. HE was crowned at Rome in the persecution of Aurelian; his principal festival is kept on the 11th of July. Baldwin IV., surnamed of Lille and the Pious, founded the collegiate churches of canons at Harlebeck, near Courtray, at Aire, and at Lille, in which last he was buried. His widow, Adela, after his death in 1067, went to Rome, received the religious veil from the hands of Pope Alexander II., and, bringing back with her the relics of St. Sidronius, enriched with them the Benedictin nunnery of Meessene, two leagues from Ipres, which he had founded, and in which she died. See Miræi, Annales Belgici, p. 609. Adela, the foundress, is honoured among the saints in this famous monastery on the 8th of January. See Gramaye, p. 182. Lubin in Martyr. Rom.

== Sources ==
- Baring-Gould, Sabine (1897), The Lives Of The Saints, vol. 7, July Pt. 1, London: J. C. Nimmo This article incorporates text from this source, which is in the public domain.
- Butler, Alban (1814), The Lives of the Fathers, Martyrs, and Other Principal Saints: Compiled from Original Monuments and Other Authentic Records, Illustrated with the Remarks of Judicious Modern Critics and Historians, J. Murphy This article incorporates text from this source, which is in the public domain.
- St. Augustine's Abbey, Ramsgate (1921), The Book of saints : a dictionary of servants of God canonized by the Catholic Church, London: A. & C. Black, ltd. This article incorporates text from this source, which is in the public domain.
- "The Romanesque church of Saint Cydroine", cirkwi
