= Georges Le Cardonnel =

French literary and art critic

- Born: 12 October 1872; Valence, France
- Died: 9 December 1941 (aged 69); Paris, France
- Occupations: Critic, novelist
- Spouse: Madeleine Dehay
- Parent(s): Louis Aimable Le Cardonnel; Amély Joséphine Cumin
- Relatives: Louis Le Cardonnel (brother)

Georges Le Cardonnel (1872–1941) was a French literary and art critic.

== Early life ==
Georges Le Cardonnel was born on 12 October 1872 in Valence, Drôme, France. His father, Louis Aimable Le Cardonnel, was an engineer. His mother, Amély Joséphine Cumin, was the owner of a clothing shop. His brother, Louis Le Cardonnel, was a Roman Catholic priest and poet.

== Career ==
Le Cardonnel co-authored a book about contemporary French literature with Charles Vellay in 1905. They based their study on the criticisms of Gaston Deschamps, Jean Ernest-Charles, Émile Faguet, and Charles Maurras, among others. The book was a success, and it was re-edited three times.

Le Cardonnel was the author of a novel, Les soutiens de l'Ordre in 1909. By 1911, Le Cardonnel served on the editorial board of Paris-Journal, an arts review for which he reviewed the Orange Festival every year. Meanwhile, he was a contributing critic in La Revue Universelle, Les Marges, Gil Blas, L'Opinion, among other reviews. He served on the committee of the Prix Goncourt in 1932.

Le Cardonnel supported Fernand Sorlot's decision to publish the French translation of Adolf Hitler's Mein Kampf in France in 1934, even though Sorlot did not own the copyright. At the beginning of World War II, Le Cardonnel worked for Agence Havas.

== Personal life and death ==
Le Cardonnel married Madeleine Dehay in 1931. He died on 9 December 1941 in Paris. The bulk of his papers is held at the Bibliothèque littéraire Jacques-Doucet in Paris.

== Works ==
- Le Cardonnel, Georges; Vellay, Charles (1905). La littérature contemporaines: Opinions des écrivains de ce temps. Paris: Société du Mercure de France. OCLC 319007.
- Le Cardonnel, Georges (1909). Les soutiens de l'Ordre. Paris: Mercure de France. OCLC 62415361.
