= Le Front latin =

French journal (1935–1940)

Le Front latin was a French journal published from September 1935 to April 1940. It was co-edited by Fernand Sorlot and Philippe de Zara. The contributors openly supported Italian Fascism, and they called for closer relations between France and Italy, highlighting their shared Latin heritage.
