= J. M. Dent =

British book publisher (1849–1926)

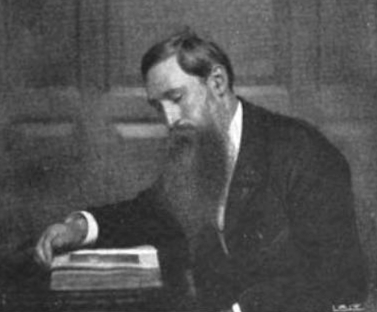
- Dent in The Sketch, 16 March 1898
- Born: Joseph Malaby Dent; 30 August 1849; Darlington, England
- Died: 9 May 1926 (aged 76); Croydon, England
- Occupation: Book publisher
- Children: 2

Joseph Malaby Dent (30 August 1849 – 9 May 1926) was a British book publisher who produced the Everyman's Library series. He founded the firm J.M. Dent and Company in 1888.

== Early life ==
Dent was born in Darlington, England, in what is now part of the Grade II listed Britannia Inn. After a short and unsuccessful stint as an apprentice printer, he took up bookbinding. At the age of fifteen, he gave a talk on James Boswell's Life of Johnson, which would be the first book printed in the Everyman's Library.

== J.M. Dent and Company, later J.M. Dent & Sons ==
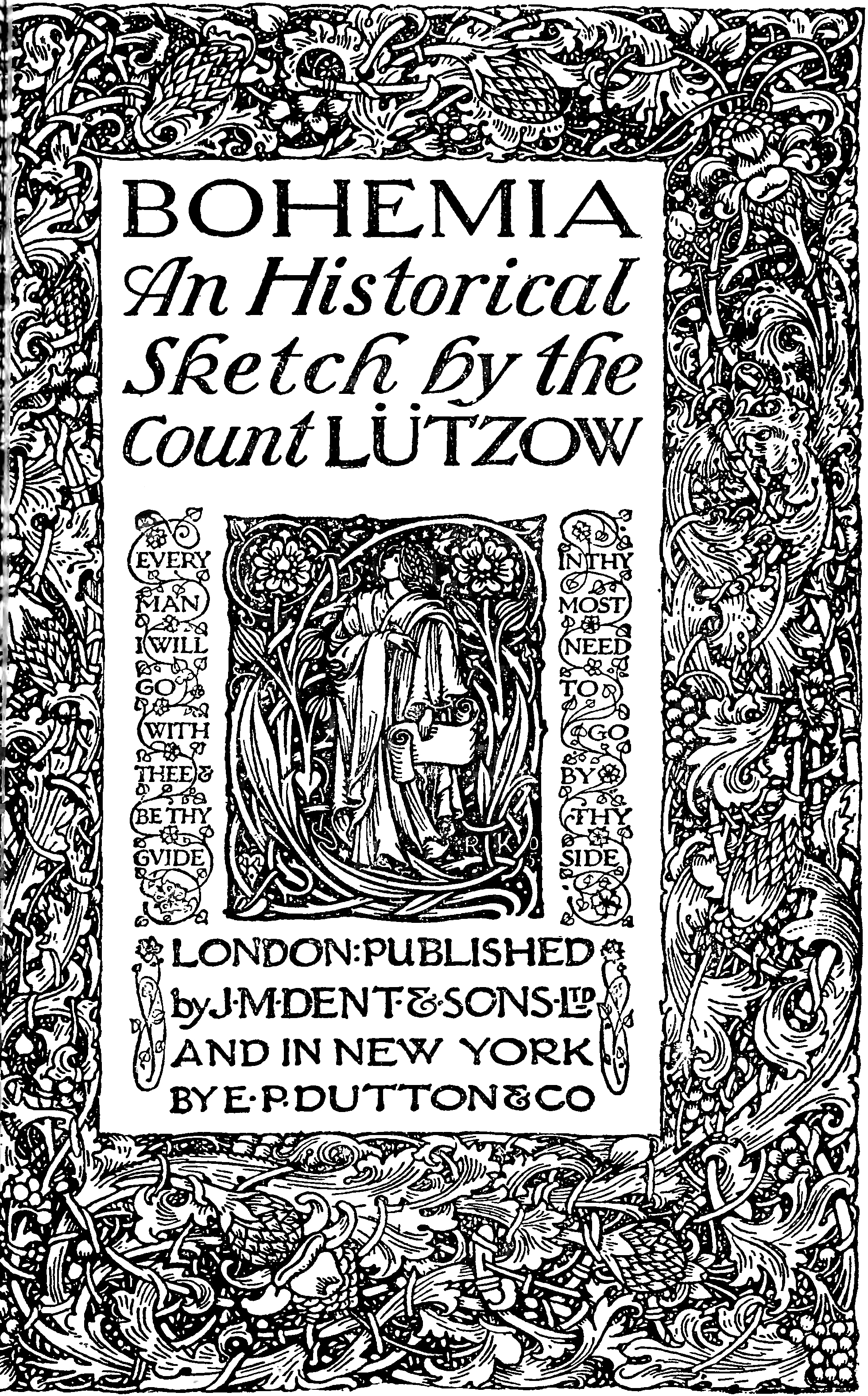
Title page of a book published by J. M. Dent & Sons

In 1888, Dent founded the firm of J.M. Dent and Company (the name was changed to J.M. Dent & Sons in 1909) and began publishing at 69 Great Eastern Street, London. Dent's first production, Charles Lamb's Essays of Elia, was edited by Augustine Birrell and illustrated by Herbert Railton, followed in 1889 by Goldsmith's Poems and Plays. Works by Jane Austen, the Brontë sisters, Geoffrey Chaucer, Daniel Defoe, Maria Edgeworth, Henry Fielding, Samuel Johnson, Lord Tennyson, and W. B. Yeats followed between 1889 and 1894. These early editions were produced in limited quantities on handmade paper and enjoyed some commercial success.

The company achieved success by selling cheap editions of the classics to the working class. Dent's first major production, the Temple Shakespeare series, was established in 1894.

Around 1896, Dent began publishing high-quality limited editions of literary classics in the Temple Classics series, followed in 1906 by Everyman's Library, a series of 1000 volumes. Although not a new idea, what set Everyman's apart from earlier series was its scope. He was able to build a new factory and offices in Covent Garden with the profits.

Among the impressive volumes that came from Dent was The Pilgrim's Regress, the spiritual autobiography of C. S. Lewis, published in 1933.

Eventually, Dent's publishing activities expanded to include textbooks, children's books, educational books, self-help books, and travel guides. Dent remained in the forefront of the publishing field by expanding sales to foreign markets, including Australia, Canada, France, New Zealand, South Africa, and the United States. Toronto House was founded in 1913.

J. M. Dent's second son, Hugh R. Dent, served as director of J.M. Dent & Sons between 1926 and 1938, taking his elder brother George's place when George left for New Zealand due to haemorrhage of the lungs and served there as vicar in the Anglican church.

W. G. Taylor, brother of Frederick Lewis Taylor, abbot of Ramsgate, served as director of J.M. Dent & Sons between 1938 and 1963. Taylor's editorial and personal correspondence with best-selling authors is kept in the Dent & Sons' archive in the University of North Carolina's Rare Book Collection, and contains correspondence with authors Robert Gibbings and Ronald A. Knox, politician Walter Nash, the Vatican, and several publishing companies, among other papers.

In the House of Dent, Hugh R. Dent describes how W. G. Taylor joined the company:

During our nine years’ residence at Letchworth my wife and I had made the acquaintance of Mr. W. G. Taylor, who was managing the property of the Garden City Tenants. This acquaintance ripened into friend¬ ship, and when the office of Secretary to J. M. Dent & Sons Ltd. became vacant in 1916, on my wife's sug¬ gestion I offered it to Mr.Taylor, but proposed that he should give it a trial for six months, as for various reasons he might not find himself able to work comfortably with us. His daily work was largely the administration of the counting-house, but his position as secretary brought him into close contact with the Chief, who acknowledged Mr. Taylor's good work, but I do not think either of them was altogether happy and at ease in the other's company. At the end of the six months Mr. Taylor decided to stay, and continued his excellent work in the organisation of the counting-house and the despatch departments. By 1922 I had decided to offer him a directorship when the time came for the Board to be reconstructed. Since then he has given much time and thought for the benefit of the trade in his work as Treasurer, President, and Vice-President of the Publishers' Association and Chairman of the Joint Advisory Committee. He is also a member of the Permanent Commission of the International Publishers’ Congress.

W. G. Taylor's son Francis was secretary of Dent & Sons and played an important role in the libel case around Sven Berlin's The Dark Monarch in 1962–63. Four St. Ives residents portrayed in it (none of them artists, although they included the poet and writer Arthur Caddick) began actions for libel.

Although Berlin created new names for all the characters, it was fairly obvious at the time who was who. Finally, an open court statement was held on 18 June 1963. The author owed Dent & Sons (who were well-insured) damages owing to lost profits after the book was withdrawn from circulation.

== Later years and legacy ==
In A Sinking Island, Hugh Kenner wrote:

"Destiny beckoned J. M. Dent toward the kingdom of books, and without ever learning to spell he became an influential bookman. He was small, lame, tight-fisted, and apt to weep under pressure, a performance that could disconcert authors and employees. When his temper had risen like a flame he'd scream; the scream, one employee recalled, was what broke men's spirits. His paroxysms were famous; a Swedish specialist thought of prescribing a pail of cold water for Dent to plunge his head into. For editing the Library he paid Ernest Rhys three guineas a volume—what senior office-boys might earn in two weeks. Dent's ungovernable passion was for bringing Books to the People. He remembered when he'd longed to buy books he couldn't afford. Yes, you could make the world better. He even thought cheap books might prevent wars."

Despite having an impressive range of literature, Dent prevented classics of dubious morals, such as Moll Flanders, from being printed. The First World War slowed the production of books and Dent did not live to see the one thousand-volume mark reached in 1956. J. M. Dent died in 1926, on 9 May in Croydon, England.

In 1986, Dent & Sons was sold to Weidenfeld & Nicolson. It now forms an imprint of the Orion Publishing Group. The registered companies of J. M. Dent & Sons and Everyman's Library were retained by the Dent family and are now, respectively, an investment company, Malaby Holdings Ltd, and Malaby Martin Ltd, a niche development company. A new sister company Malaby Biogas Ltd was created in 2009 as a pioneering renewable energy and sustainable development business.
