= Laroche-Saint-Cydroine =

- Commune
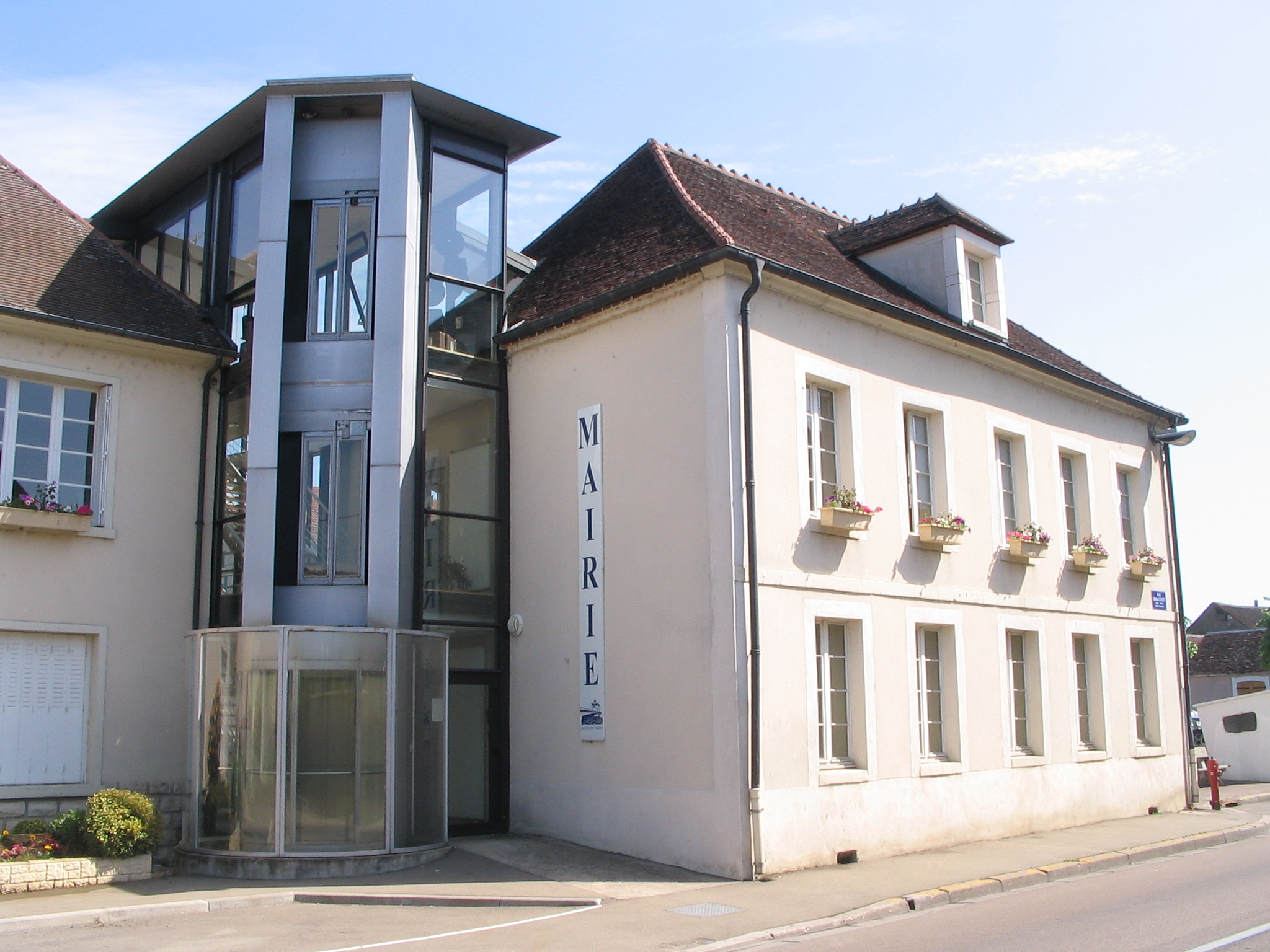
- The town hall in Laroche-Saint-Cydroine
- Location of Laroche-Saint-Cydroine
- Location within France Location within Bourgogne-Franche-Comté
- Coordinates: 47°57′58″N 3°29′06″E
- Country: France
- Region: Bourgogne-Franche-Comté
- Department: Yonne
- Arrondissement: Auxerre
- Canton: Migennes
- Area^{1}: 8.95 km^{2} (3.46 sq mi)
- Highest elevation: 161 m (528 ft)
- Lowest elevation: 77 m (253 ft)
- Population (2023): 1,185
  - Density: 132/km^{2} (343/sq mi)
- Time zone: UTC+01:00 (CET)
  - Summer (DST): UTC+02:00 (CEST)
- INSEE/Postal code: 89218 /89400
- ^{1} French Land Register data, which excludes lakes, ponds, glaciers > 1 km^{2} (0.386 sq mi or 247 acres) and river estuaries.

Laroche-Saint-Cydroine (French pronunciation: [la ʁɔʃ sɛ̃ sidʁwan]) is a commune in the Yonne department in Bourgogne-Franche-Comté in north-central France.

== Name ==
The village of Saint-Cydroine in the commune of Laroche-Saint-Cydroine is named after Saint Sidronius. It is said that Sidronius was martyred here by the Romans, and a spring here with miraculous powers was a place of pilgrimage in the Middle Ages.

== Church ==
The Église Saint-Cydroine de Laroche-Saint-Cydroine is an 11th- or 12th-century Romanesque church with an octagonal tower in the village dedicated to the saint. It was founded by the abbey of La Charité-sur-Loire.

== Transportation ==
The commune is served by trains at Laroche-Migennes station.

== See also ==
- Communes of the Yonne department

== Sources ==
- "The Romanesque church of Saint Cydroine", cirkwi
