= Rémy Roux =

French politician

- Born: 29 June 1865; Nice, Alpes-Maritimes, France
- Died: 14 July 1957 (aged 92); Marseille, Bouches-du-Rhône, France
- Occupation: Politician

Rémy Roux (1865–1957) was a French politician. He served as a member of the Chamber of Deputies from 1924 to 1932.
