= Fernand Sorlot =

French editor and publisher

Fernand Sorlot (2 March 1904, Bédoin, Vaucluse – 10 August 1981, Le Vaumain, Oise) was a French editor and publisher. In 1934, his publishing company, the Nouvelles Éditions latines, published a French translation of Mein Kampf by Adolf Hitler. Sorlot did not own the copyright, and he was sued by the Franz Eher Nachfolger, mainly because Hitler did not want the French to read the book. Meanwhile, from 1935 to 1940, Sorlot was the co-editor of Le Front latin, a fascist journal. After World War II, Sorlot was convicted of Indignité nationale for ten years.
