= St Augustine's Abbey, Chilworth =

Benedictine abbey in Surrey, England

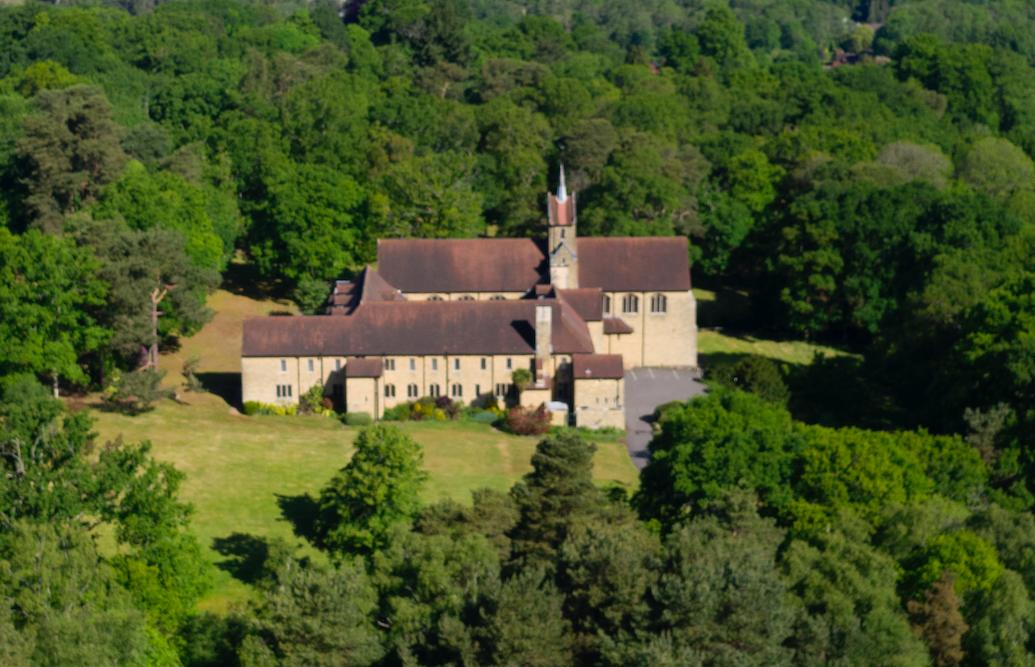
- St Augustine's Abbey from the air

- Location within Surrey
- Interactive map of St Augustine's Abbey, Chilworth

Monastery information
- Other names: Church of the Holy Ghost; Greyfriars Friary; Chilworth Friary; Chilworth Abbey
- Order: Order of St Francis; Order of Saint Benedict
- Established: 18 June 1892; November 2011
- Dedication: Francis of Assisi; Augustine of Canterbury
- Diocese: Arundel and Brighton

People
- Founders: Mary Anne Alliott; Fr Arthur Wells

Architecture
- Status: Abbey
- Functional status: Active
- Heritage designation: Grade II
- Designated date: 28 October 1986
- Architect: Frederick Walters
- Completion date: 18 June 1892
- Construction cost: £7,000

Site
- Location: Chilworth, Surrey
- Coordinates: 51°12′31″N 0°31′30″W
- Website: https://www.chilworthbenedictines.com

St Augustine's Abbey or Chilworth Abbey, formerly Chilworth Friary, is a Roman Catholic Benedictine abbey in Chilworth, Surrey. The building, which is Grade II listed, was designed by Frederick Walters and was built in 1892. It was formerly a Franciscan friary and a novitiate for the order. The abbey church is open to the public 365 days a year.

== Friary ==
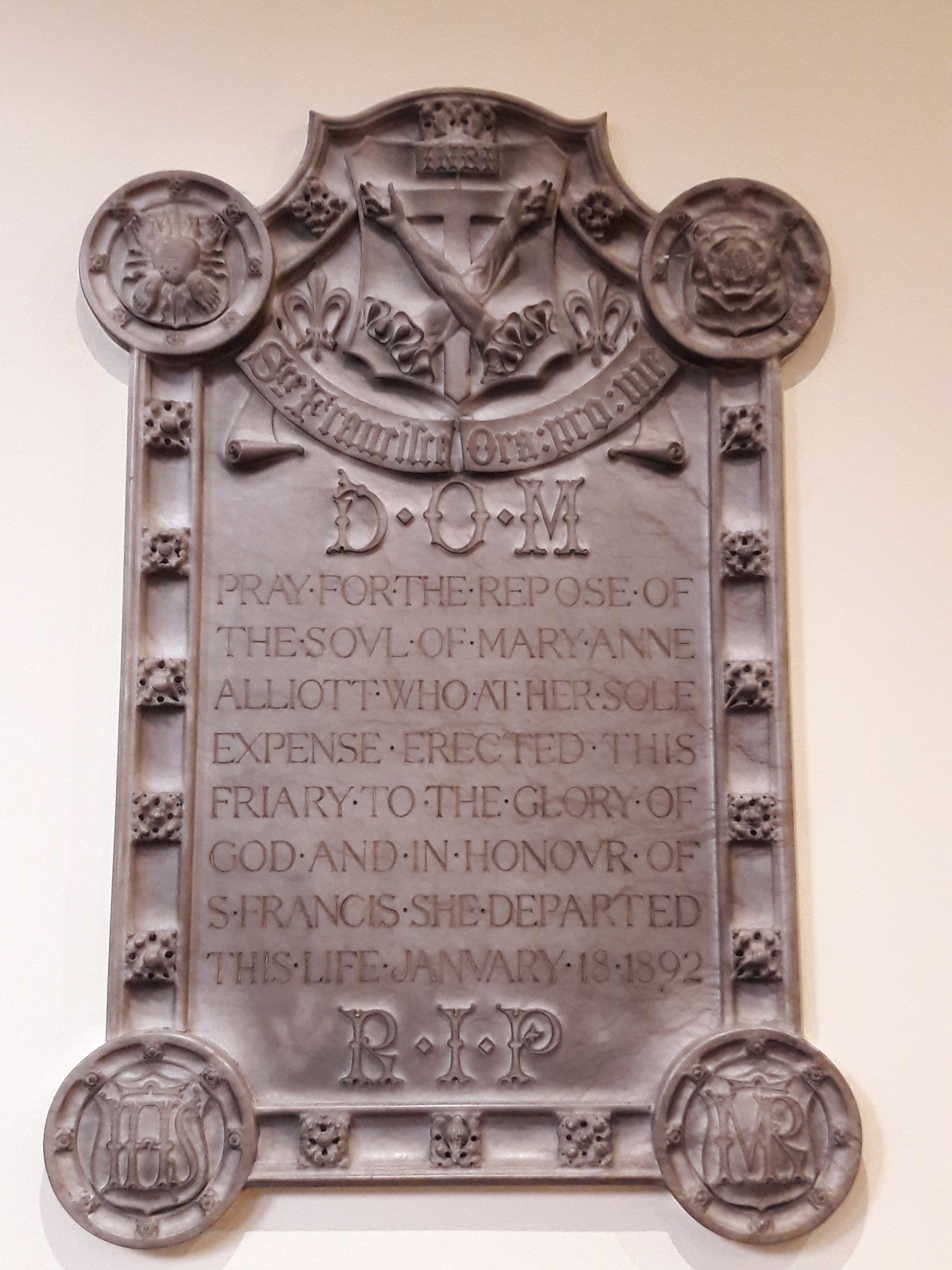
Plaque dedicated to Mary Anne Alliott

=== Construction ===
Construction of the friary started in 1890 and it was designed by the architect Frederick Walters, who also designed the nearby St. John's Seminary in Wonersh. It was financed by a £7,000 bequest from Mary Anne Alliott who was the aunt of the founder of the friary, Fr Arthur Wells. On 18 June 1892 the friary and church was dedicated and consecrated by the Bishop of Southwark. The friary was built to serve as a novitiate for the Franciscans in Britain.

=== Developments ===
The yew tree in the centre of the cloister was planted from a cutting taken from the Ancient Yew at Muckross Abbey in Killarney, Ireland. In 1915, an organ, built by Lewis & Co was installed. It was paid for by John Courage of Derryswood, Wonersh (owner of both Lewis & Co and Courage Brewery) and was done with permission from the architect. The same year, Albert Ketèlbey wrote his light classical music piece, In a Monastery Garden, having visited the friary.

=== Parish ===
In 1945, the parish of Holy Ghost Church was entrusted to the friary. It expanded and the friary also served a Mass centre in Gomshall, Our Lady of the Angels.

== Abbey ==
In 2011, it was announced that the friars would leave Chilworth. The friars were distributed amongst the other Franciscan houses in Britain and the parish church of the Holy Ghost was closed. That year, St Augustine's Abbey in Ramsgate also closed and the Benedictine monks from the Order of St Benedict, of the Subiaco Cassinese Congregation, looked for a smaller property to move into. When Chilworth Friary became available, they agreed to move to the area and it became St Augustine's Abbey.

The monastic community follows the Rule of St Benedict under the guidance of an Abbot, centred on the Divine Office and Mass prayed daily in the Abbey Church, often in a mix of Latin and English including Gregorian Chant. The community currently numbers eight monks and one postulant. There are a number of lay oblates. The monks run a guest house and offer a programme of retreats, monastic vocation visits, study days, meditation sessions and healing days. They also make and sell skin creams and furniture polish made from bees wax. St Augustine's Abbey, Chilworth compiles 'The Book of Saints, A Comprehensive Biographical Dictionary' by Dom Basil Watkins OSB.

St Augustine's Abbey is not a parish church but the abbey church is open to the public to attend services every day of the year, along with other regular events in the church calendar.

== Gallery ==
=== Exterior ===
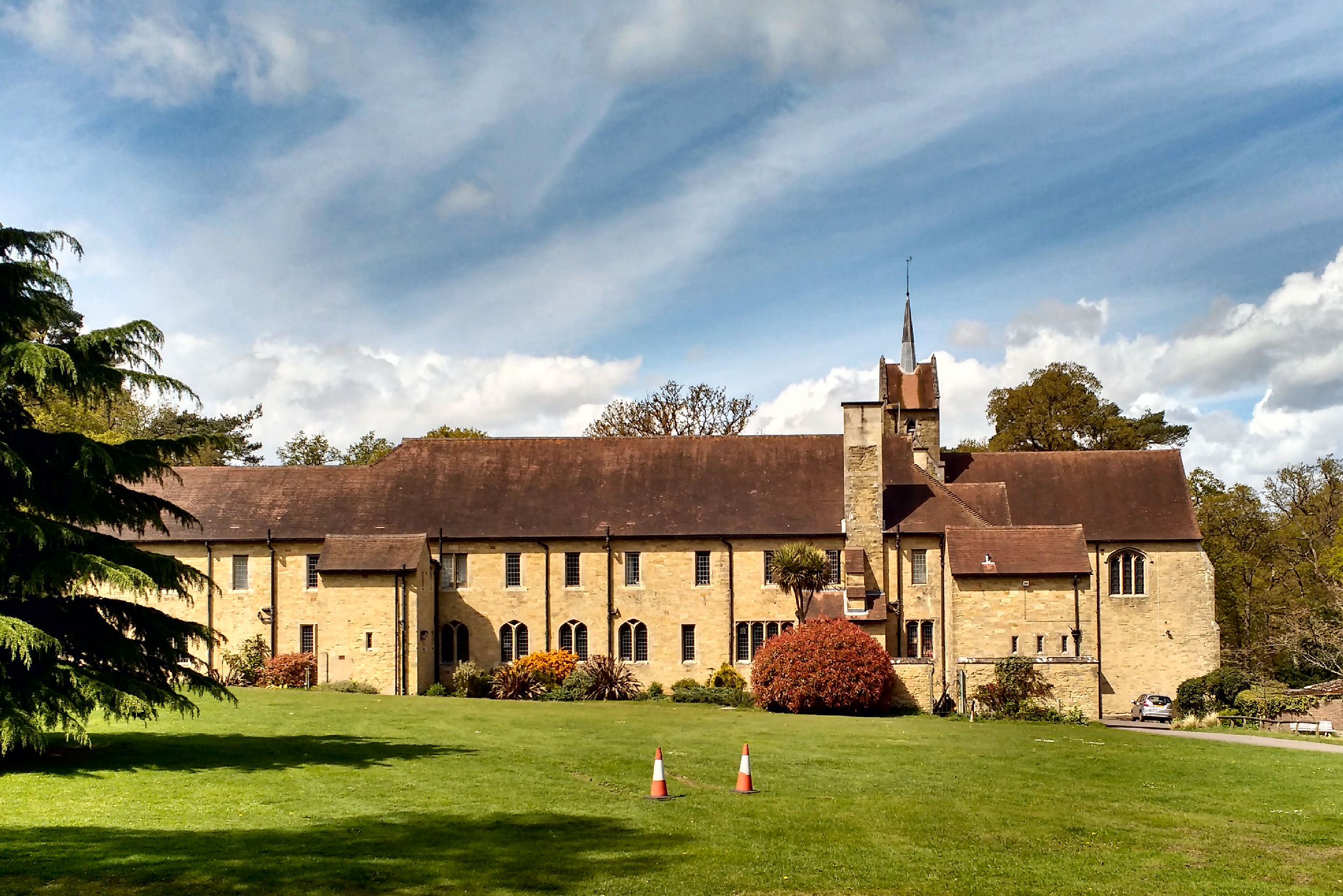
South side of the abbey

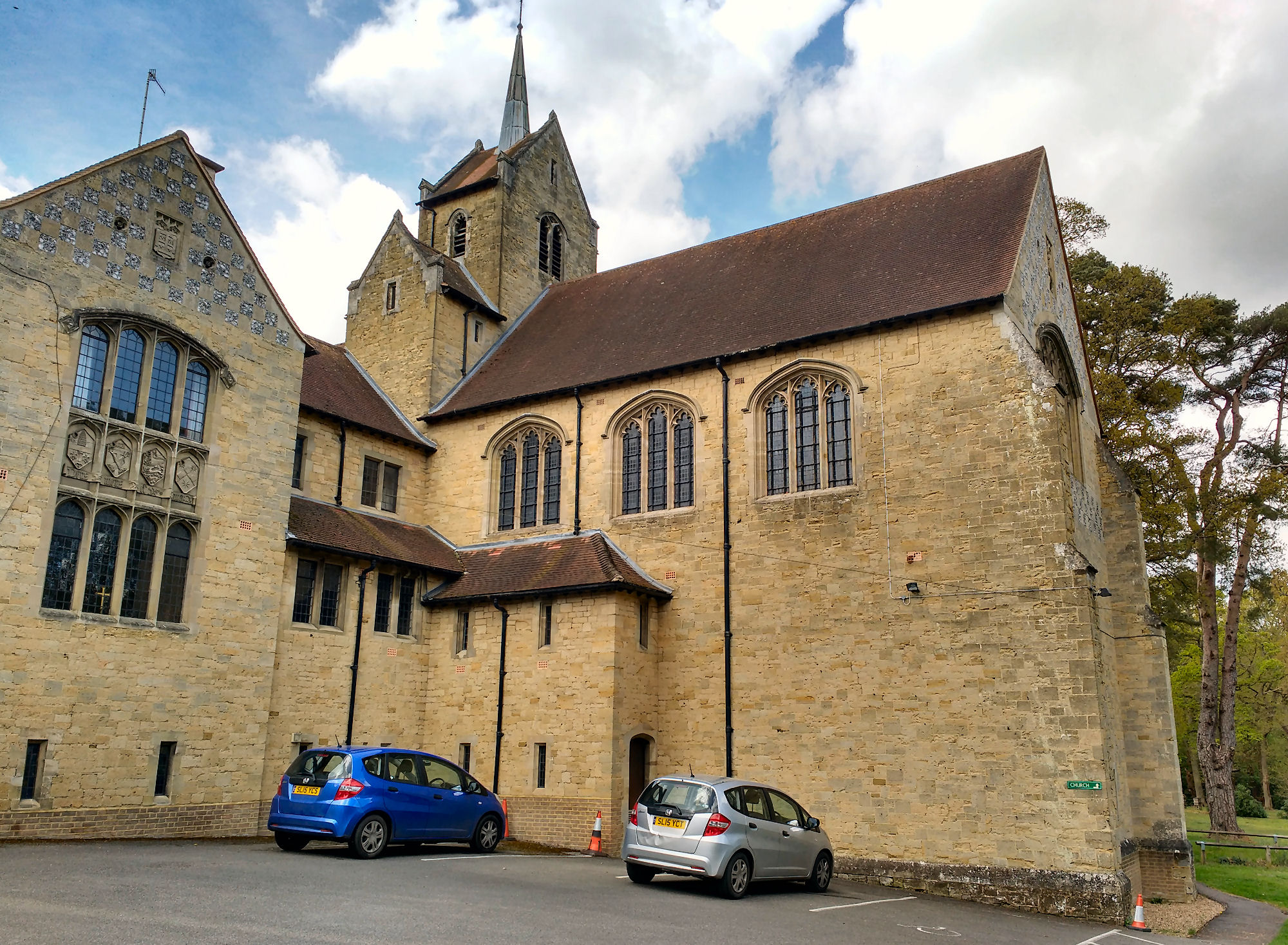
East side

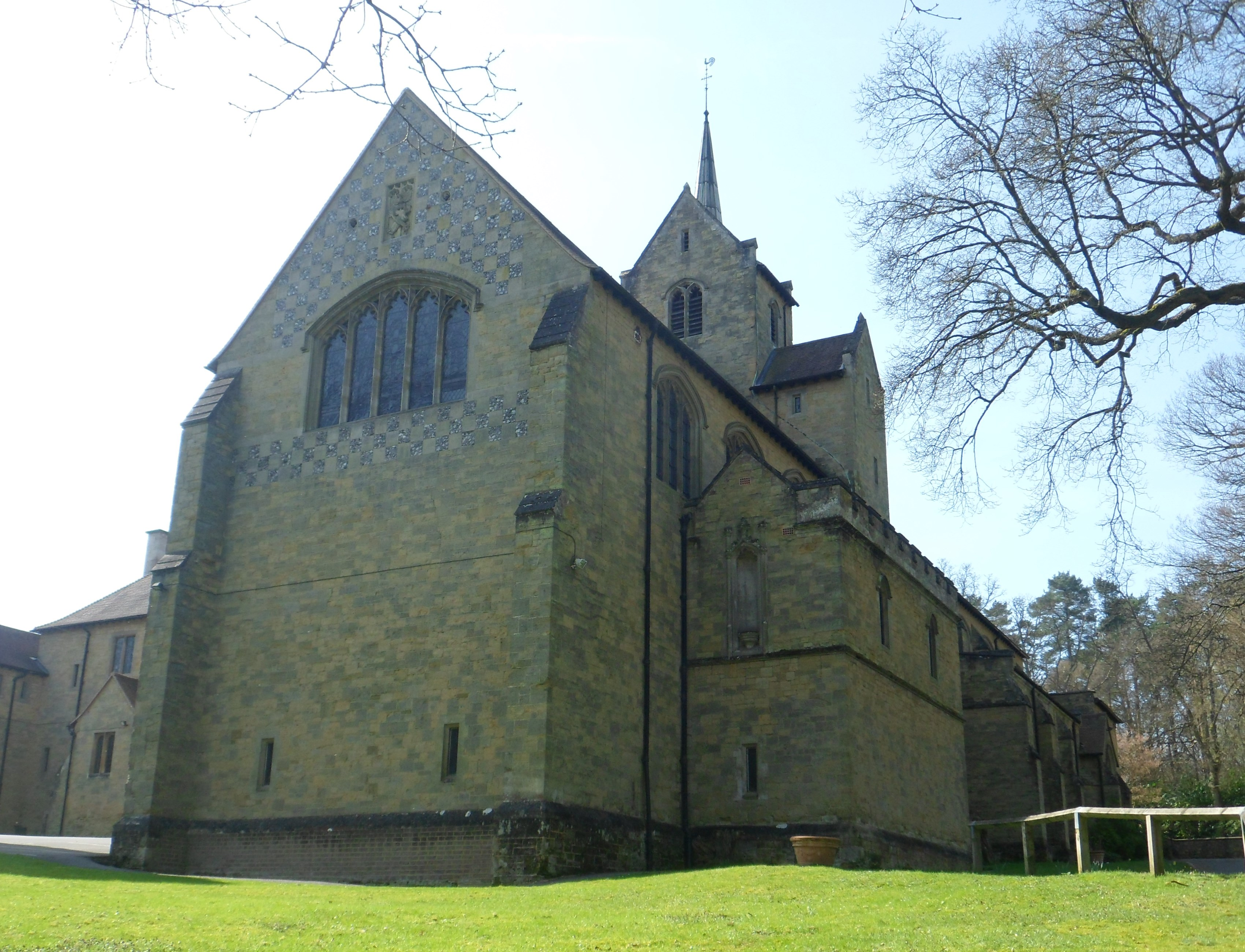
Abbey Church

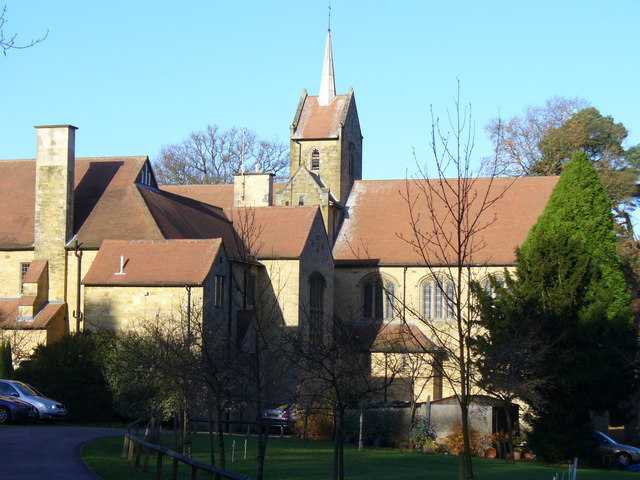
Southeast view of the abbey

=== Interior ===
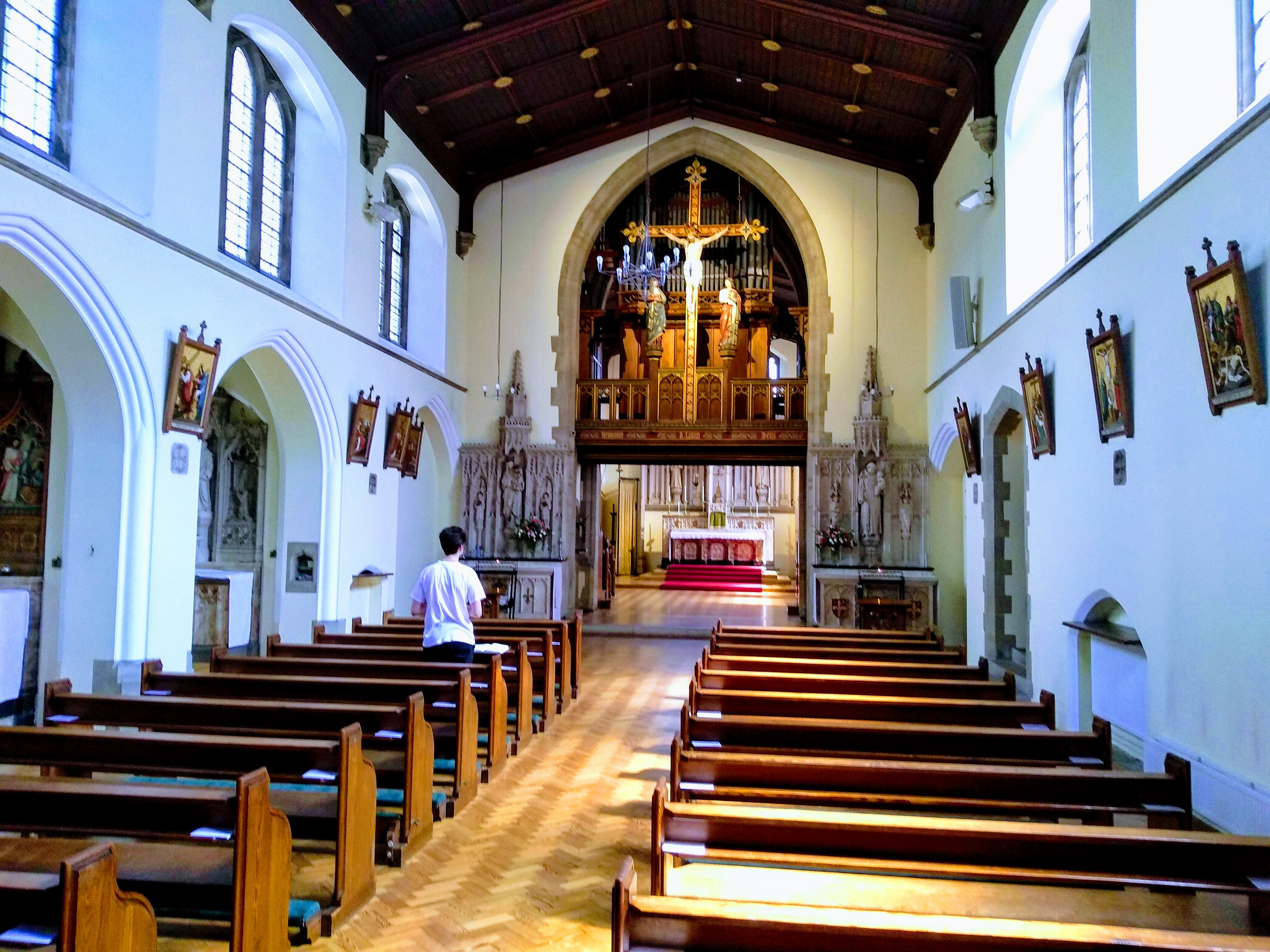
Interior

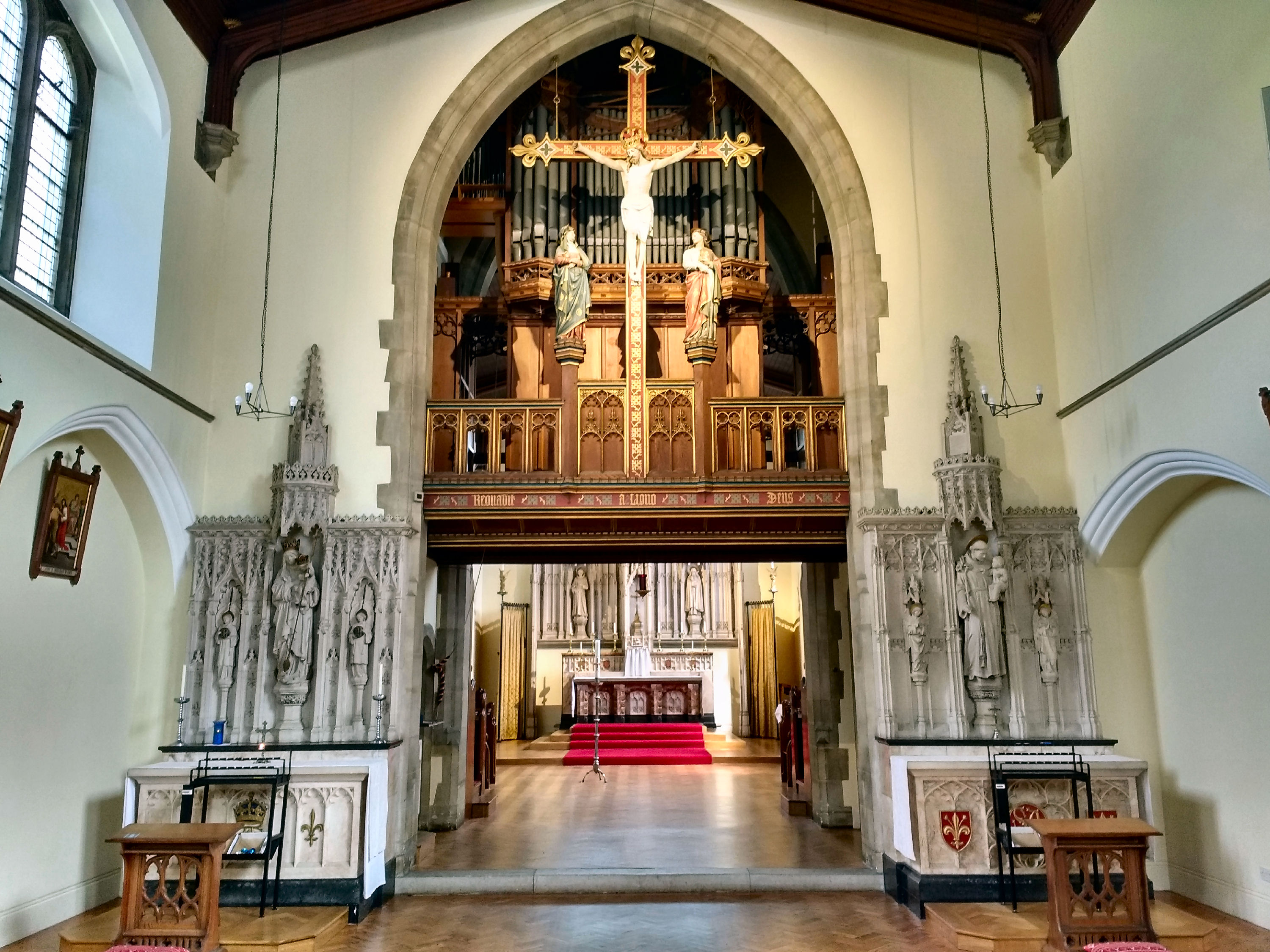
Organ

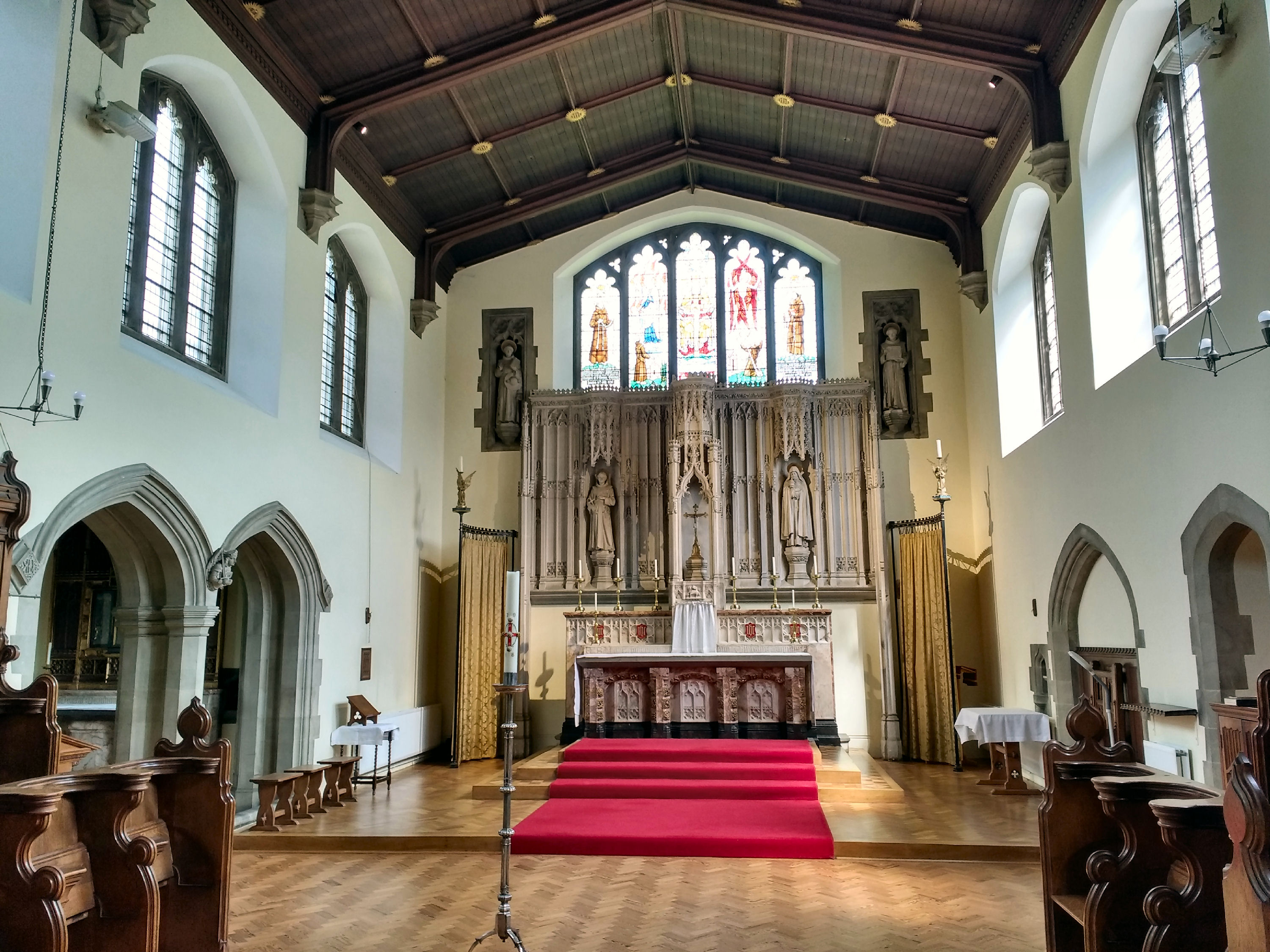
Chancel

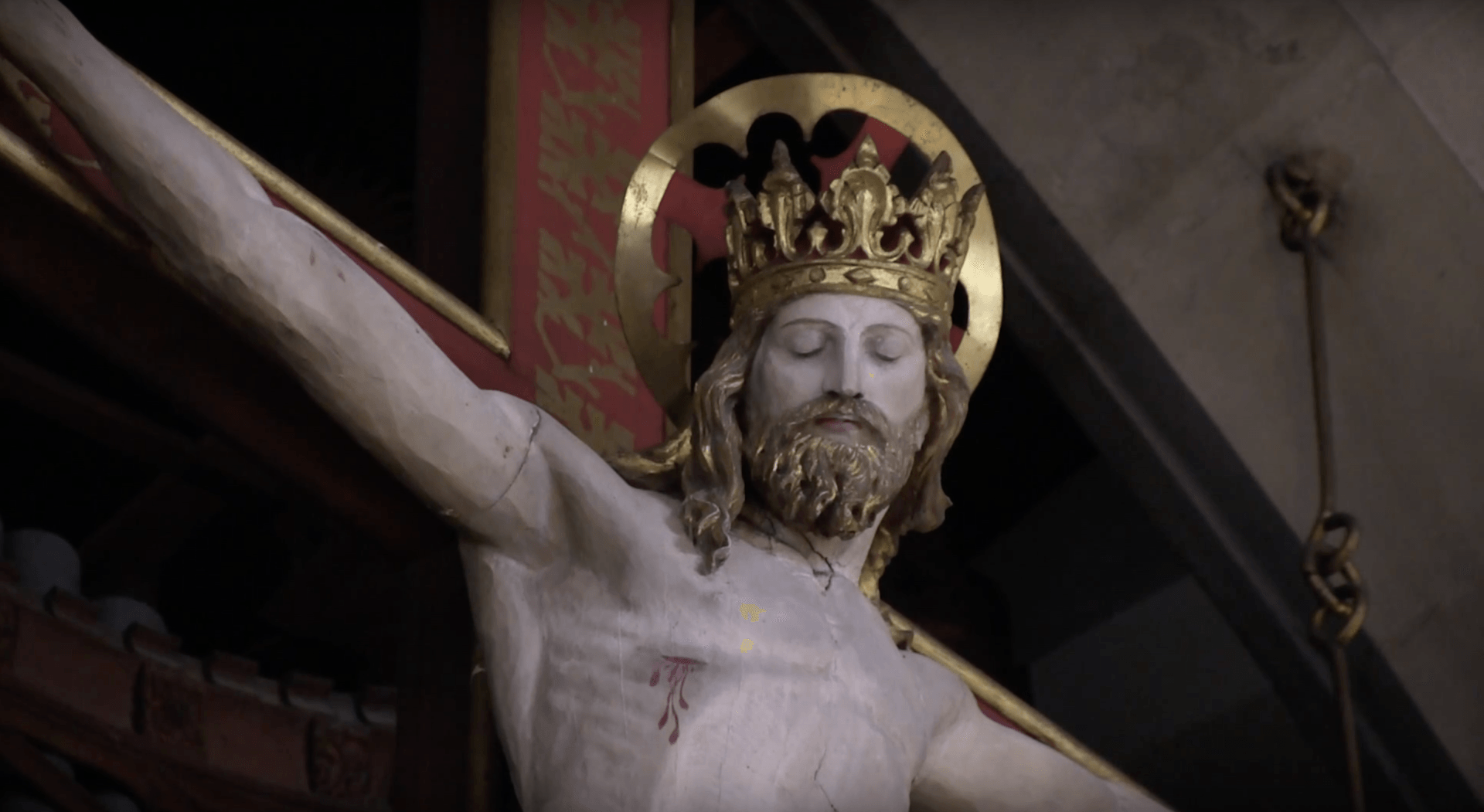
Christ figure in Abbey Church

== See also ==
- Franciscan
- List of places of worship in Waverley (borough)
- St Augustine's Abbey, Ramsgate
- Subiaco Cassinese Congregation
