= Philippe de Zara =

French journalist, novelist and travel writer

Philippe de Zara (1893–?) was a French journalist, novelist and travel writer. His travel book entitled Autour de la mer latine won the Prix Montyon from the Académie française in 1934. He was the co-editor of Le Front latin, a fascist journal, from 1935 to 1940.

== Works ==
- de Zara, Philippe (1933). Autour de la mer latine. Orient-Italie-Tunisie. Paris: Nouvelles Editions latines. OCLC 493630918.
- de Zara, Philippe (1936). Mustafa Kemal : Dictateur. Paris: Nouvelles Editions latines. OCLC 491637111.
- de Zara, Philippe (1938). Mussolini contre Hitler. Paris: Nouvelles Editions latines. OCLC 901204435.
