= Louis Le Cardonnel =

French poet and Roman Catholic priest (1862 - 1936)

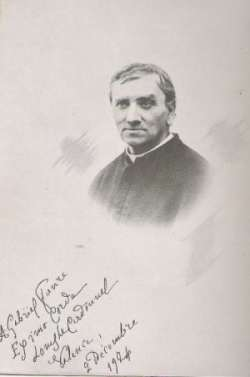
- Louis Le Cardonnel in 1924
- Born: 22 February 1862; Valence, France
- Died: 28 May 1936 (aged 74); Avignon, France
- Occupation: Poet
- Parent(s): Louis Aimable Le Cardonnel; Amély Joséphine Cumin
- Relatives: Georges Le Cardonnel (brother)

Louis Le Cardonnel (22 February 1862 – 28 May 1936) was a Roman Catholic priest and French poet. He won two literary prizes from the Académie française.

== Early life ==
Louis Le Cardonnel was born on 22 February 1862 in Valence, Drôme, France. He was of Irish descent. His father, Louis Aimable Le Cardonnel, was an engineer. His mother, Amély Joséphine Cumin, was the owner of a clothing shop. His brother, Georges Le Cardonnel, was a novelist and critic.

Le Cardonnel briefly attended a seminary in Issy-les-Moulineaux before dropping out. He subsequently attended another seminary in Rome, and he was an ordained as a Roman Catholic priest in 1896.

== Career ==
Le Cardonnel served as a priest until 1900, when he joined the Order of Saint Benedict and became an oblate. He subsequently served as the vicar of the Église Saint-Jean-Baptiste in Pierrelatte.

Le Cardonnel began composing poetry in 1881. He began composing poetry while he was a priest in France, then resumed poetry in Tuscany, Italy for nine years. He was influenced by classical antiquity and the Celtic culture. His main themes were the seasons, especially the autumn, melancholy, death, and the Crusades. His poetic style emphasized the sounds of vowels and alliterations.

Le Cardonnel won two literary prizes from the Académie française: the Prix Capuran for Poèmes in 1905, and the Prix Broquette-Gonin for Carmina sacra in 1913.

== Death ==
Le Cardonnel died on 28 May 1936 in Avignon.

== Works ==
- Le Cardonnel, Louis (1904). Poèmes. Paris: Société du Mercure de France. OCLC 422260137.
- Le Cardonnel, Louis (1912). Carmina sacra. Paris: Société du Mercure de France. OCLC 422030498.
- Le Cardonnel, Louis (1920). Du Rhône à l'Arno. Paris: La Connaissance. OCLC 78420071.
- Le Cardonnel, Louis (1924). De l'une à l'autre aurore. Paris: Société du Mercure de France. OCLC 875754929.
