= Nouvelles Éditions latines =

French publishing house

- Founded: 1928
- Founder: Fernand Sorlot
- Headquarters: France
- Products: Books

Nouvelles Éditions latines, "The New Latin Publishing" (NEL) is a French publishing house founded in 1928 by Fernand Sorlot whose name remains associated with the publication of the French translation of Mein Kampf by Adolf Hitler.

The editorial line of the NEL is generally in the movement of the traditionalist far right.

== History ==
=== Creation ===
In April 1928, Fernand Sorlot, associated with the French Action movement of Charles Maurras and Marcel Bucard, created the Les Étincelles editions housed at 34 rue des Archives. In February 1931, a group of young writers founded the "New Latin Editions". Initially at the warehouse of Les Étincelles, they moved to 21 rue Servandoni at the end of that year, and put distribution in the hands of the Maison du livre français. They were managed by Georges Raeders and Fernand Sorlot.

In the 1930s, the house bought Éditions Bossard and Éditions Catalogne, devoted to foreign literature. Some works were published under other brands, such as Fernand Sorlot or Sorlot.

On June 18, 1934, a lawsuit was upheld against the Munich publisher for the recent translation of Hitler's Mein Kampf to the Nouvelles Éditions latines, and publication of the translation ceased.

Sorlot, who had been accused of having published the translation without authorization, declared he had deliberately ignored the ban, wanting to make it available to the French, to inform them, an unredacted translation while the one that was sold to the English and the Italians the east. He is ordered to stop selling the book and destroy existing stocks and printing plates.

=== Occupation and purification ===
The December 10, 1941, Fernand Sorlot accepts the help of the German publisher Paul List Verlag to publish three new collections: "Writers of the Century", "The Masterpieces" and "The European Life". He was arrested on September 5, 1944, then released on 24.

In the meantime, the Publishers Union decides to exclude Bernard Grasset, Gilbert Baudinière, Jacques Bernard, Jean de La Hire, Henry Jamet, and Fernand Sorlot.

The December 6, 1944, he is arrested again; he is released on January 17, 1945. On May 17, the national interprofessional purge commission pronounces a reprimand without publicity against Sorlot. His judgment takes place on May 15, 1948 for his activities during the Occupation. He was sentenced to twenty years of national indignity and the confiscation of his property up to the amount of two million francs at the time.

The publishing house subsequently continued its editorial activity, also distributing the publisher Les Sept Couleurs (the house created by Maurice Bardèche).

== Editorial catalog ==
The New Latin Editions catalog has more than 2,000 titles and different collections such as:

- “Art and Tourism” (small brochures on regional heritage)
- "The Catholic World"
- "Le Monde littéraire"
- “History” (includes many subsections)

=== Some publications ===
- Roger Trinquier, The New State
- Pierre Fontaine
- Jean-Philippe Delsol
- Paul Rassinier, Les Responsables de la Seconde Guerre mondiale
