= St Augustine's Abbey, Ramsgate =

Former Benedictine abbey in Ramsgate, England

St Augustine's Abbey
- Divine Retreat Centre, UK
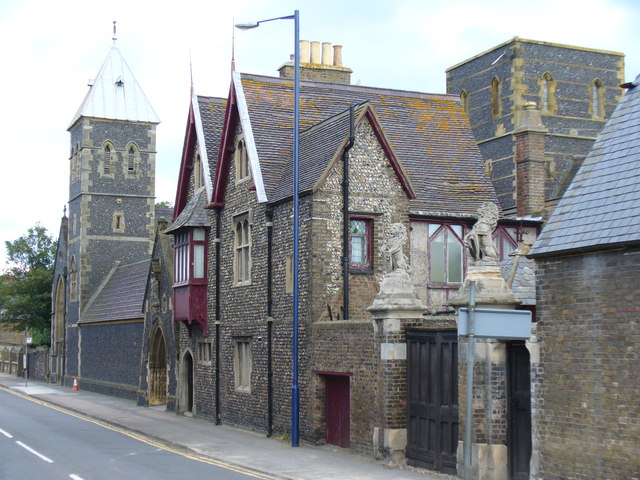
- St Augustine's Church, St Edward's Presbytery, and the gate of The Grange: opposite the abbey site

- Location within Kent

Monastery information
- Order: Benedictine
- Established: 1856
- Disestablished: 2010
- Dedication: Augustine of Canterbury
- Diocese: Southwark

People
- Important associated figures: Edward Pugin; Peter Paul Pugin

Architecture
- Status: Active
- Functional status: Retreat Centre
- Heritage designation: Grade I listed
- Architect: Edward Pugin; Peter Paul Pugin

Site
- Coordinates: 51.328644°N 1.410229°E

St Augustine's Abbey or Ramsgate Abbey is a former Benedictine abbey in Ramsgate. It was built in 1860 by Augustus Pugin and is a Grade II listed building. It was the first Benedictine monastery to be built in England since the Reformation. In 2010, the monks moved to St Augustine's Abbey in Chilworth, Surrey. The site is now owned by the Vincentian Congregation from Kerala, India. The church of St Augustine, across the road from the abbey site, belongs to the Archdiocese of Southwark and is a shrine of St Augustine of Canterbury.

== History ==
Augustus Pugin had built his home, The Grange, in Ramsgate, and St Augustine's Church next door. He donated the church to the Catholic Diocese of Southwark before his death in 1852, and The Grange remained in private hands.

In 1856, the Bishop of Southwark, Thomas Grant, invited the Subiaco Cassinese Congregation of the Benedictines to form a monastic community in Kent and take over the running of the church. The abbey was built across the road from the church and this was designed by Edward Pugin and Peter Paul Pugin.

The monastery became independent in 1876, a priory in 1881 and was raised to the status of an abbey by Pope Leo XIII in 1896. In 1865, a school was established by the monks which lasted until 1995.

In 1936, in nearby Minster-in-Thanet, a group of Benedictine nuns arrived and set up a priory on the remains of a 7th-century abbey and named it St Mildred's Abbey.

== Abbots of St Augustine's ==
1. James Alcock: 1872 - 1893 (individual title)
2. Thomas Bergh: 1893 - 1909 (individual title)
3. Erkenwald Egan: 1909 - 1934
4. Frederick Lewis Taylor: 1934 - resigns 1st Aug 1954.
5. Anselm Thatcher: 1954 – 8th March 1957
6. David Parry: 1957 – 1972
7. Gilbert Jones: 1972 - 1988)
8. Bernard Waldron: 1988 - 1996
9. Laurence O'Keeffe: 1996 - 2008
10. Paulinus Greenwood: 2008 up to this day, continued in St Augustine's in Chilworth.

== Departure of the Monks ==
Coat of arms of Dom Paulinus Greenwood, former abbot of the Abbey

On 15 October 2009, it was decided by the monks to relocate to a smaller property which would be easier to maintain. On 23 December 2010, they agreed to move to a former Franciscan friary in Chilworth, Surrey. When they moved in 2011, they named the friary St Augustine's Abbey maintaining continuity between the abbey in Ramsgate and their new home.

St Augustine's Church was returned to the care of the Archdiocese of Southwark. On 1 March 2012, the Archbishop of Southwark, Peter Smith established the church as a Shrine to St Augustine of Canterbury. On 20 May 2012, the church was inaugurated as a shrine at Solemn Vespers and a relic of St Augustine, donated by the Oxford Oratory, was placed in the church.

The abbey was sold by the monks to the Vincentian Congregation in 2014. It is now Divine Retreat Centre UK, and hosts charismatic Catholic retreats.

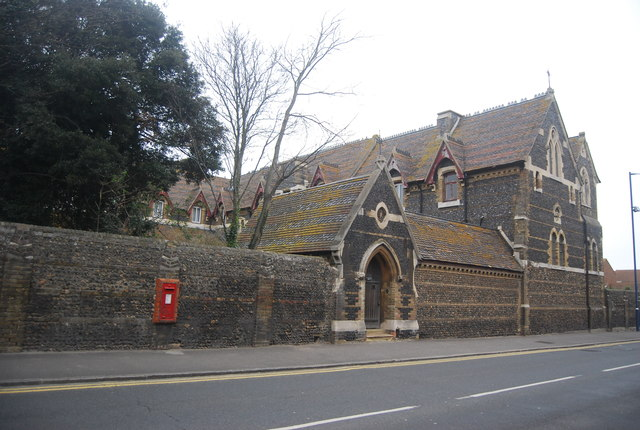
View of the abbey

== Published works ==
- St. Augustine's Abbey, Ramsgate (1921). The Book of saints : a dictionary of servants of God canonized by the Catholic Church. London: A. & C. Black, ltd. OCLC 671676136.

== See also ==
- The Grange, Ramsgate
- St Augustine's Abbey, Chilworth
- St Mildred's Abbey, Minster
- Subiaco Cassinese Congregation
