= 17th (Service) Battalion, Royal Fusiliers (Empire) =

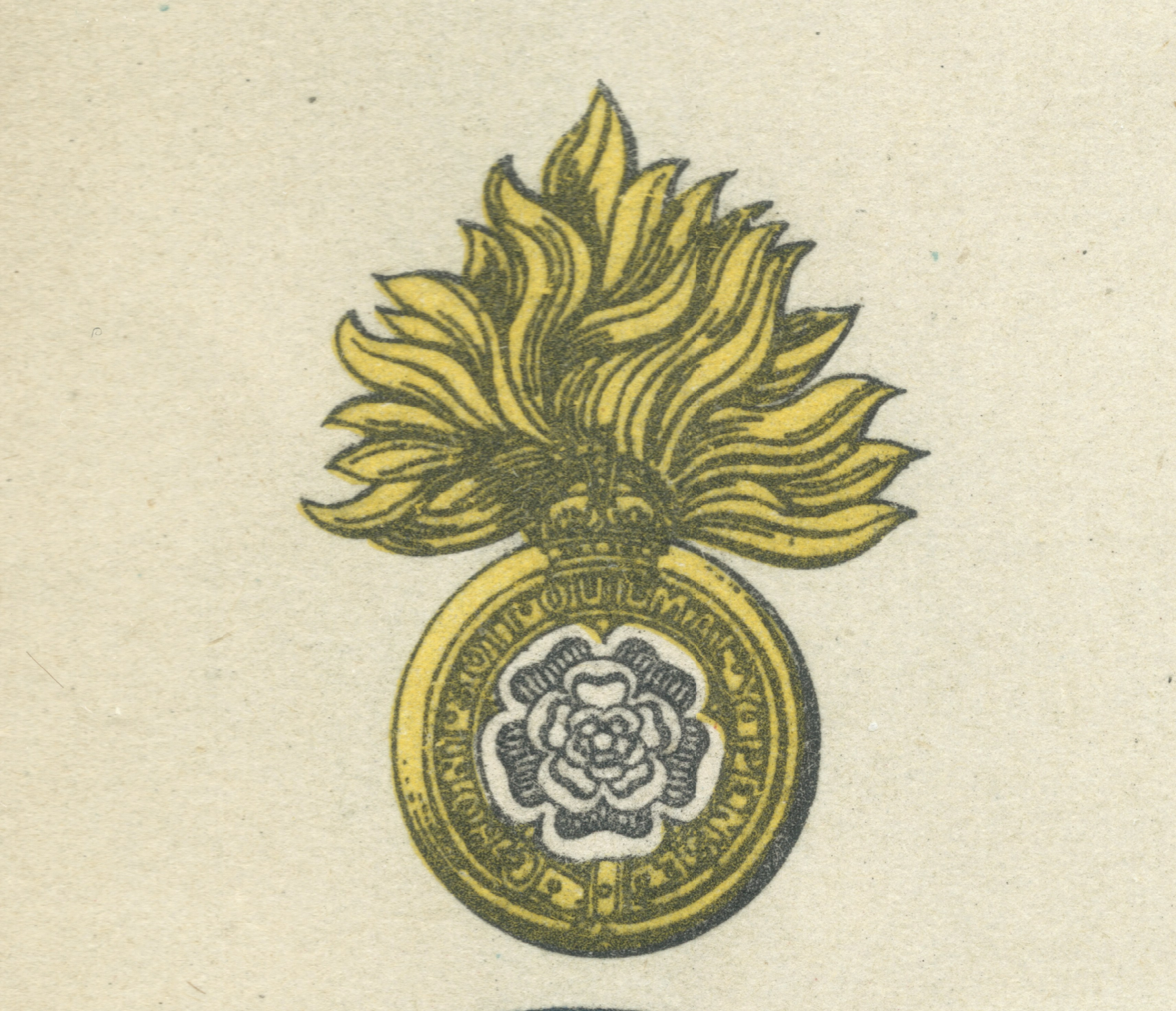
- Cap badge of the Royal Fusiliers
- Active: 31 August 1914–26 October 1919
- Allegiance: United Kingdom
- Branch: New Army
- Type: Pals battalion
- Role: Infantry
- Size: One Battalion
- Part of: 2nd Division
- Garrison/HQ: London
- Engagements: Battle of the Somme; Battle of the Ancre; Battle of Arras; Battle of Cambrai; German spring offensive Hundred Days Offensive

Commanders
- Colonel of the Regiment: General Sir Bindon Blood

The 17th (Service) Battalion, Royal Fusiliers (Empire), (17th RF) was a 'Pals battalion' recruited as part of 'Kitchener's Army' in World War I. It served with the 2nd Division on the Western Front from November 1915 until the Armistice, seeing action on the Somme and the Ancre, at Arras and Cambrai (where one of its officers won the Victoria Cross), against the German spring offensive, and in the final Hundred Days Offensive, when it made a daring crossing of the St Quentin Canal.

== Recruitment and training ==
Alfred Leete's recruitment poster for Kitchener's Army.

On 6 August 1914, less than 48 hours after Britain's declaration of war, Parliament sanctioned an increase of 500,000 men for the Regular British Army. The newly appointed Secretary of State for War, Earl Kitchener of Khartoum, issued his famous call to arms: 'Your King and Country Need You', urging the first 100,000 volunteers to come forward. Men flooded into the recruiting offices and the 'first hundred thousand' were enlisted within days. This group of six divisions with supporting arms became known as Kitchener's First New Army, or 'K1'. The K2, K3 and K4 battalions, brigades and divisions followed soon afterwards. But the flood of volunteers overwhelmed the ability of the Army to absorb them, and the K5 units were largely raised by local initiative rather than at regimental depots, often from men from particular localities or backgrounds who wished to serve together: these were known as 'Pals battalions'. The 'Pals' phenomenon quickly spread across the country, as local recruiting committees offered complete units to the War Office (WO). One such unit was raised by the 'British Empire Committee' (BEC) of 60 Victoria Street, London. Under the leadership of General Sir Bindon Blood (chairman), Herbert Nield, MP, and Major-General Lionel Herbert (secretary), the committee first thought of forming a mounted regiment along the lines of the Imperial Light Horse of the Second Boer War, but the WO indicated that cavalry was not required. Instead, on 30 August the BEC was authorised to raise an infantry battalion and began recruitment next day. The complete battalion was recruited in 10 days and assigned to the Royal Fusiliers (City of London Regiment) as its 17th (Service) Battalion. On 12 September the battalion went to Warlingham in Surrey to begin its training, where it was clothed, equipped and hutted by the efforts of the BEC. Its first Commanding Officer (CO) was Major Harland Bowden, MP, a former officer in the Royal Field Artillery (Territorial Force). (Note: At the request of the WO, the BEC went on to raise 153rd (Empire) Brigade and 154th (Empire) Howitzer Brigade of the Royal Field Artillery (authorised on 1 February 1915) and 204th Field Company and 39th Divisional Signal Company of the Royal Engineers (authorised on 2 February 1915).)

The battalion was assigned to 120th Brigade of 40th Division, which were renumbered 99th Brigade and 33rd Division in May 1915. This brigade consisted of the 17th (Empire), 22nd (Kensington), 23rd (1st Sportsman's) and 24th (2nd Sportsman's) service battalions of the Royal Fusiliers. In June the battalions moved to Clipstone Camp in Nottinghamshire, where 33rd Division was concentrating. At the beginning of August the division moved to Tidworth Camp for final battle training on Salisbury Plain.

=== 27th (Reserve) Battalion ===
The two reserve companies of the 17th RF remained at Warlingham when the battalion departed for Clipstone Camp in June 1915. In August they joined the reserve companies of the 22nd (Kensington) battalion at Horsham in Sussex and were formed into 27th (Reserve) Battalion, commanded by Lt-Col Innes from the 22nd RF. The 32nd (East Ham) Battalion, RF, was formed in October 1915 and eventually its reserve companies also joined 27th (R) Bn. In November the battalion moved to Oxford as part of 24th Reserve Brigade (an all-Royal Fusiliers brigade), and in April 1916 the brigade moved to Edinburgh. On 1 September 1916 the Local Reserve battalions were transferred to the Training Reserve and 27th (R) Bn RF became 103rd Training Reserve Battalion, though the training staff retained their Royal Fusiliers badges. The battalion was disbanded on 14 December 1917 at Catterick Camp.

== Service ==
On 4 November 1915, 33rd Division was ordered to move to France, to join the British Expeditionary Force (BEF) fighting on the Western Front. On 17 November 17th RF landed at Boulogne and by 21 November the whole division had concentrated at Morbecque. BEF policy was to even up the experience between its New Army and Regular Army formations by exchanging brigades and then distributing the experienced Regular battalions through the New Army formations. On 25 November 99th Bde moved to Béthune where it transferred to 2nd Division in exchange for 19th Bde. Then on 13 December it exchanged two Royal Fusiliers Pals battalions for Regular battalions from 2nd Division, so that the 17th (Empire) and 24th (2nd Sportsman's) battalions were now in 5th Brigade with the highly experienced 2nd Oxfordshire and Buckinghamshire Light Infantry (OBLI) and 2nd Highland Light Infantry (HLI).

2nd Division's formation sign.

2nd Division was holding the line in the Cuinchy sector, where the raw Pals battalions were introduced to Trench warfare by the experienced units. 17th RF was temporarily commanded by Maj C.G. Higgins from 2nd OBLI. From 30 December to 25 January 1916 the division trained round Busnes, then returned to the Béthune sector, where the battalions began rotating between front line and reserve trenches at Festubert and Givenchy. On 28 February 2nd Division relieved a French division south of Lens. It spent the next two months in this area, alternating spells in the line with training and providing working parties.

On 21 May the Germans put in a major attack on the British positions on Vimy Ridge, preceded by a heavy bombardment and the explosion of a mine. The attack overwhelmed the forward positions of 47th (1/2nd London) Division. 2nd Division was ordered up from reserve in buses and lorries, thereafter holding the line until mid-July while subsequent mines were blown, raids carried out, and the Germans mortared and shelled the positions, including the use of gas shells, but 5th Bde was not engaged in heavy fighting.

=== Somme ===
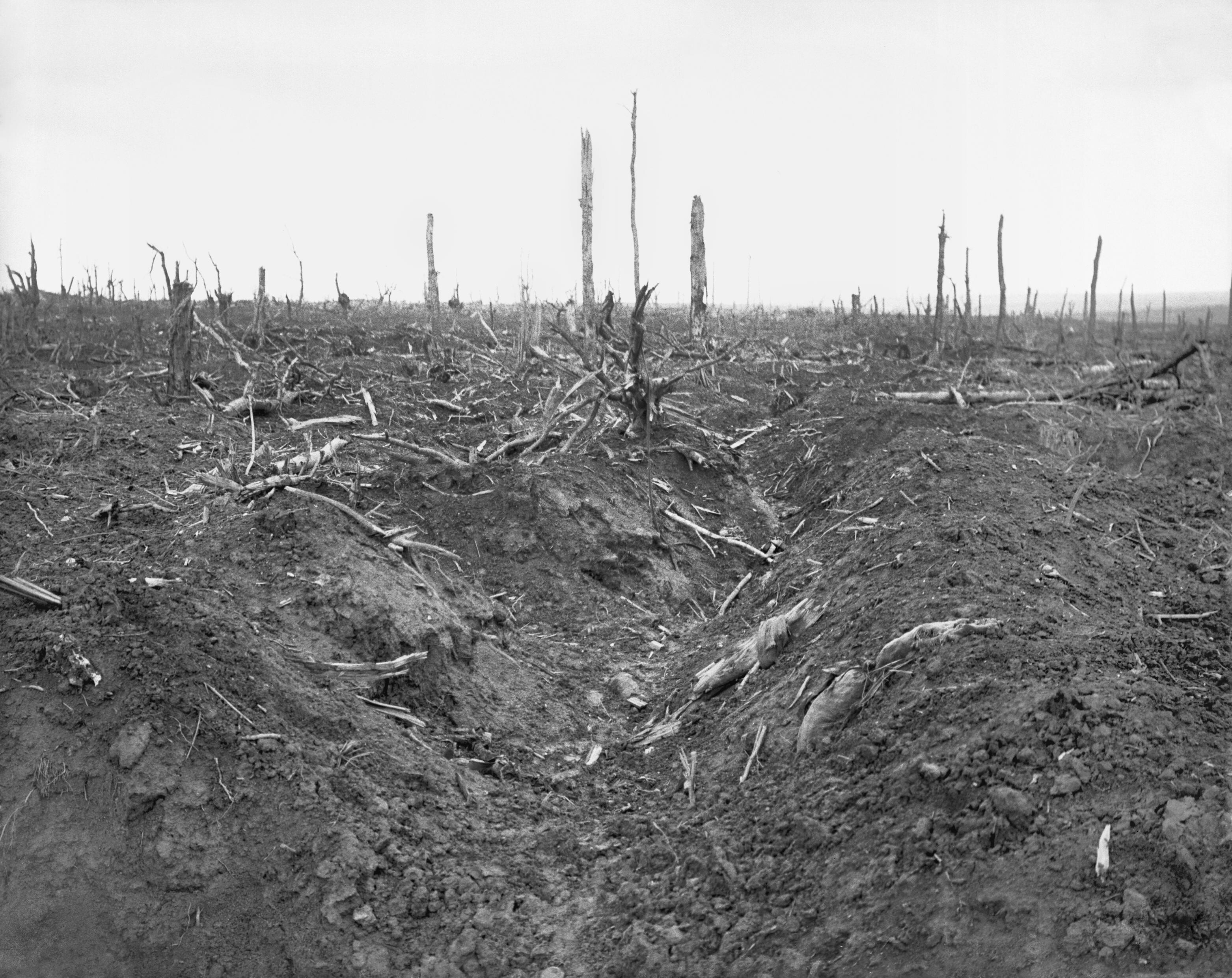
An abandoned German trench in Delville Wood.

That summer's 'Big Push' (the Battle of the Somme) opened on 1 July, and on 15 July 2nd Division was withdrawn from the Vimy front for training. On 20 July it was sent south to join in the offensive and on 25 July relieved 3rd Division at Montauban. 5th and 99th Brigades relieved the troops facing Delville Wood, which had already withstood several attacks. 99th Brigade then attacked on 27 July and succeeded in clearing the rest of the wood. Thereafter the wood and the British starting line, including 5th Bde, was subjected to heavy German shelling, making it difficult to get supplies up to the fighting as the Germans threw in fierce counter-attacks. At 17.15 A and B Companies of 17th RF were sent up to reinforce 99th Bde, suffering heavily from this fire on the way up. There was further German shelling and unsuccessful counter-attacks throughout 28 July; 17th RF suffered 118 casualties in these two days, its first offensive action.

Part of 5th Bde was engaged in the failed first attack from Waterlot Farm towards Guillemont on 30–31 July, then after a short rest it supported 6th Bde in another attack on Guillemont on 8–9 August, but on neither occasion was 17th RF directly engaged. The division then moved to the Hébuterne sector, with 17th RF in the front line.

This sector was quieter, but there was still considerable mine warfare, shelling and raiding. On the night of 14/15 September 2nd Division carried out a series of large raids as a diversion from the Battle of Flers–Courcelette. These were preceded by discharges of gas and intense bombardments by Stokes mortars as well as field and heavy artillery. 99th Brigade was to carry out the first assault, and 5th and 6th Bdes to begin theirs after the blowing of a mine at 'Cat Street' at midnight. 99th Brigade's attack was cancelled, but parties from 17th RF and 2nd HLI dashed forward after the mine explosion. However, the mine had not destroyed the German barbed wire, which prevented 2nd HLI from getting into their trenches; although 17th RF's parties got into the trench in two places they found then unoccupied and had to return empty-handed.

=== Ancre ===
2nd Division was relieved on 19 September and after resting and training in Corps Reserve it went back into the line in the River Ancre sector on 30 September. 5th Brigade was divisional reserve and continued training for an attack scheduled for mid-October, rehearsing the attack against dummy trenches. However the attack was repeatedly postponed due to bad weather, the front line and communication trenches filling with water. The attack (the Battle of the Ancre) was finally made on 13 November. On 2nd Division's front the initial assault was made by 5th and 6th Bdes, which formed up at 04.00 in front of the mud-filled trenches and then advanced along Redan Ridge behind a creeping barrage at 05.45. 5th Brigade attacked with 24th RF and 2nd HLI, 17th RF supporting the HLI, each man wearing a patch of red material on his haversack to aid recognition from the air. Another mine was blown at Cat Street in front of the brigade, which gained its initial objective ('Beaumont Trench', the Green Line) and captured large numbers of prisoners, unlike 6th Bde, which was held up by fog and mud. The support battalions, 17th RF and 2nd OBLI, then advanced towards the Yellow Line, but the OBLI lost direction in the mist and drifted north-west. About 120 men of 17th RF got to the Yellow Line ('Frankfort Trench'), but with both flanks in the air they had to withdraw and by 10.25 the battalion (now about 180 strong) had established a right-angle position along 'Crater Lane Trench' linking 2nd Division to the neighbouring 51st (Highland) Division, which had captured Beaumont-Hamel. During the initial attack casualties had been light, but then the enemy reacted with machine gun fire, snipers, and bombing parties, inflicting heavy losses on 5th Bde; 17th RF lost 187 men. The battalion held onto the advanced positions during the night, then 99th Bde went through next day but failed in an attempt to capture 'Munich Trench'. 2nd Division was relieved on 15 November and moved into the back areas to refit and train.

On 13 January 1917 2nd Division. returned to the Somme front, taking over a line of individual posts on the Ancre Heights facing Petit Miraumont. 17th RF was in reserve at Ovillers-la-Boisselle. There was little hostile activity, but much effort was expended to improve the positions. On 5/6 February 5 Bde relieved 99th Bde in the front line, and on the evening of 11 February 17th RF carried out a raid on 'Desire Support Trench' near Miraumont. The raiding party consisted of two officers and 34 other ranks (ORs), along with a covering party and stretcher-bearers, and the operation had been practised over taped ground behind the lines. The raiding party, dressed in white camouflage, crawled out at 19.55 and got into position in the snow in front of the wire, then the covering artillery opened intense fire at 20.05 for 3 minutes while two parties with rifle grenades fired into the enemy sap. The raiders having crawled forward while this bombardment was carried out, then rushed forward and jumped into the enemy trench. They found and bombed four dugouts and took back 7 prisoners at a cost of 13 casualties. Later in the month, 99th and 6th Bdes attacked Desire Support Trench in a bloody little action.

Shortly after the action at Miraumont, while 5th Bde was preparing to renew the attack, the Germans began retreating to their Hindenburg Line defences (Operation Alberich). Patrols from 17th RF discovered this on 2nd Division's front at Courcelette early on 24 February, and pushed their line forward to occupy the German positions. By 10.00 5th Bde was advancing cautiously through a thick mist without finding the enemy. Next day the divisions were ordered to send out advance guards and regain contact with the Germans. On 26 February 2nd Division found them holding Grévillers Trench in strength. The pursuit having been brought to a halt, it became clear that a set-piece attack was necessary to take Grévillers Trench, and it would be some time before the artillery could move up over the roads destroyed by the retreating enemy. 99th Brigade finally made the attack on 10 March, and the Germans resumed their retreat to the Hindenburg Line on 14 March. 2nd Division was squeezed out of the line by the converging advance on 18 March.

=== Arras ===
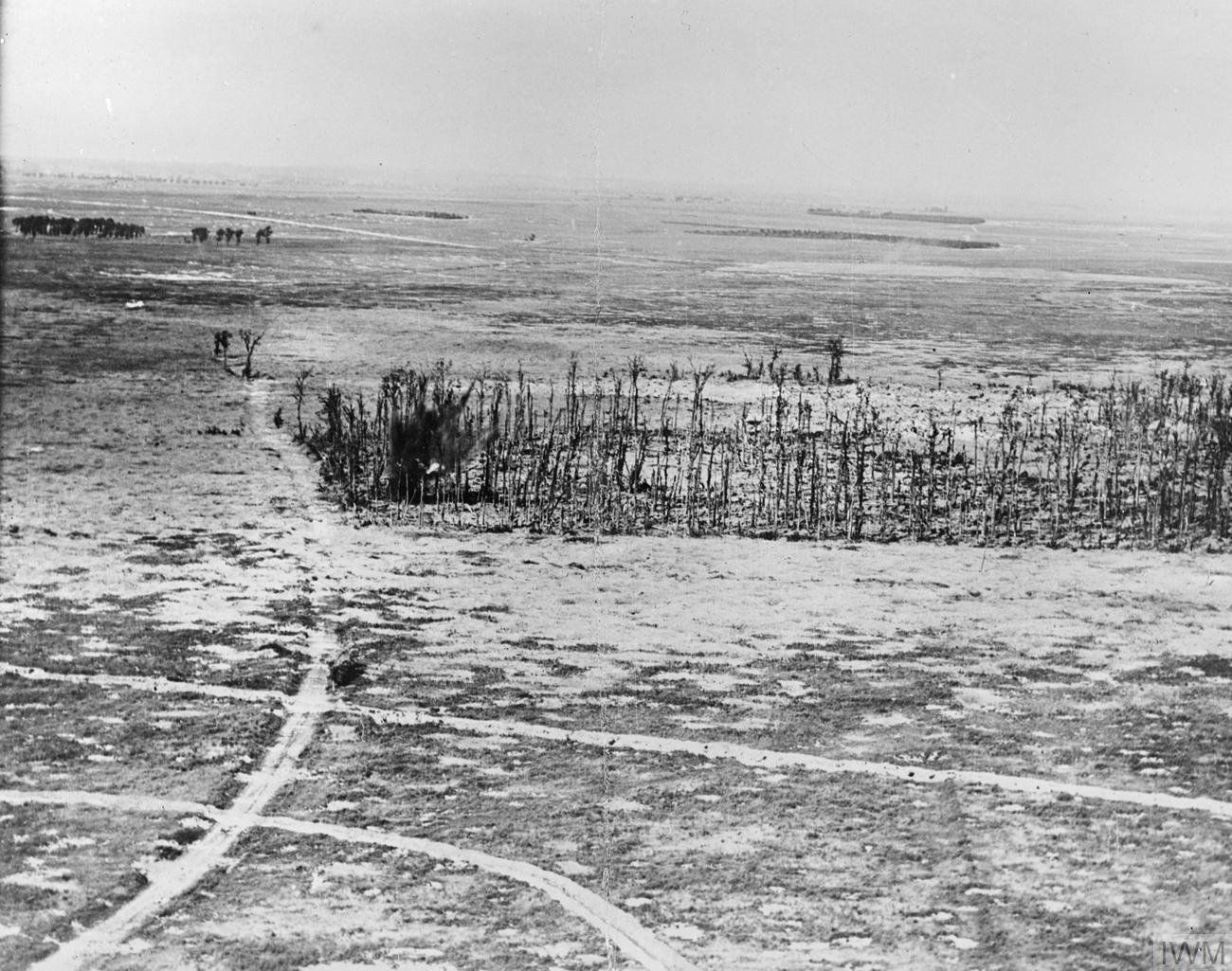
Oppy Wood from the air

On 24 March 2nd Division began travelling north to join First Army for the forthcoming Arras Offensive, for which it underwent intensive training. The offensive began well with a successful attack at Vimy Ridge on 9 April; 2nd Division took over part of the line in a snowstorm on 11 April, with 17th RF in brigade reserve holding the captured German trenches. The division began improving its positions, but the Germans soon withdrew from the vulnerable villages beneath the ridge and fell back to stronger positions, 2nd Division following up to Hill 80 on 13/14 April. Here it was facing the Arleux–Oppy line. On 16 April a patrol from 17th RF reconnoitred the wire in front of this line; it met and fought an enemy patrol and only one man got away, but his report showed the wire to be thick and unbroken. 5th Brigade was relieved by 6th Bde on 18/19 April, but was back in the line on 28 April when the attack on the Arleux–Oppy position began. It led with 2nd OBLI and 2nd HLI, with 17th RF in close support with orders to provide carrying parties and 'moppers-up' to clear the trenches and dugouts behind the attacking battalions. 2nd Division's attacking strength was weak, but it went forward behind the creeping barrage at 04.25. By the time it reached the wire the enemy's machine guns were firing at the leading battalions, and their defensive artillery and mortar barrage came down on the following troops. Nevertheless, 2nd OBLI made good progress and reached its second objective. 2nd HLI was held up by wire, and did not catch up with the barrage until it reached the German support trenches (the Blue Line). It could not advance beyond that because of heavy enfilade fire from Oppy Wood and village, so B Company of 17th RF formed a defensive flank for the brigade on that side. The rest of the division's attack had not gone well, and 5th Bde was out in front of its neighbours; 99th Bde made another failed attempt to advance on the right the following day, after which the exhausted 2nd Division was withdrawn.

Oppy Wood, 1917. Evening by John Nash.

2nd Division was required to make a further attack in the Oppy area on 3 May. It was so weak that for this operation it formed four composite battalions each about 400 strong, with A Battalion under Lt-Col S.V.P. Weston of the 1st Royal Berkshire Regiment consisting of one composite company from each of 5th Bde's battalions. The rest of 5th Bde held the line until the night of 1/2 May, when the composite brigade took over the line. Just before 'Zero' (03.45) on 3 May, the enemy put down an artillery barrage on the forming-up position, but the attackers went in, with A Battalion in reserve. The brigade got into its objective, Fresnoy Trench and began bombing along it, but once again a neighbouring formation failed in a direct attack on Oppy, leaving the Composite Bde's flank open. German counter-attacks began at 05.00 and the right and centre had to fall back and companies of A Battalion were sent up to help, but only some of the gains could be held. 2nd Division was relieved that night, 5th Bde marching back to Villers Chapel.

By now 2nd Division's units were very weak ('bled white' in the words of the Official History): 17th RF had a total strength of 23 officers and 252 ORs. Even when it went back to hold the line many of the reinforcements needed additional training (particularly with the rifle), so the frontline strength remained low. The division was unfit for any offensive action for months to come, and was not involved in the Third Ypres Offensive that summer. In June the division moved to the Béthune sector where both sides carried out frequent trench raids: C Company of 17th RF, holding 'Death or Glory Sap', was raided by two German parties just after midnight on 4 July, but they were driven off. On 10 August a tunnelling company of the Royal Engineers (RE) exploded a defensive mine in front of 5th Bde. Later the enemy were seen to have occupied the crater, so 17th RF was ordered to capture and consolidate it on the night of 11/12 August. An attacking party of 75 men under Maj Hale advanced in two waves at 21.35, preceded by an artillery barrage and supported by six rifle grenadiers. As soon as the attack began the Germans evacuated the crater, which 17th RF was able to wire; the attackers pulled out at 02.45 leaving three posts to hold it. The battalion named it 'Warlingham Crater' after 17th RF's 'birthplace'. By 1 September 2 Division held the Givenchy sector, with 5th Bde in the 'Canal' section; units of the Portuguese Expeditionary Corps were interspersed between those of 2nd Division for their introduction to trench warfare. The sector was quiet apart from the regular use of gas by both sides.

=== Bourlon Wood ===
2nd Division was relieved on 7 October and went to the Auchel area for intensive training. In early November it was moved behind Ypres, with 5th Bde at Zermezeele, expecting to join the fighting there. However, that offensive was ending, and on 18 November the division began moving south to join Third Army. Two days later Third Army launched a surprise attack with tanks towards Cambrai. This succeeded in breaching the Hindenburg Line, but heavy fighting continued in Bourlon Wood. On the evening of 26 November 2nd Division relieved units of 36th (Ulster) Division astride the Bapaume–Cambrai road, with 5th Bde in divisional reserve around Hermies. The following evening 99th Bde sent 22nd RF to help a neighbouring division, and 17th RF came up from reserve to replace it. On 29 November 99th Bde cut off part of an enemy salient penetrating into its line, leaving the line fairly secure, apart from an advanced sap leading deep into No man's land (the 'Rat's Tail', formerly part of the Hindenburg support line). However, a massive German counter-attack came in on the morning of 30 November. 17th RF was still under 99th Bde, holding the centre of its line, including the Rats Tail. The battalion was in the act of withdrawing from this exposed position when the enemy barrage came down, particularly heavily on 99th Bde. The rearguard platoon in the saphead under Capt Walter Stone held up the whole German advance for some time while the rest of the battalion reorganised its line some 500 yards (460 m) back. There were no survivors from the rearguard in the Rat's Tail, but Capt Stone had telephoned back valuable information on the development of the attack. He was awarded a posthumous Victoria Cross (VC). The enemy attempted to capture C Company's 'bombing block' in the sap, but failed, and afterwards 17th RF sent a bombing party up that established a more advanced block. The enemy attacked again at 11.15, concentrating on 17th RF's line, but a brief penetration was driven back with the help of a company of 23rd RF. At 13.00 the battalion reported that its line was secure and that 'the men were really enjoying the novel experience of killing Germans in lumps at point-blank range'. At 15.10 the Germans attacked again after a 25-minute bombardment, but were thrown back with terrible losses. At 16.10 the Germans massed for a final attack from three sides on the block in the Rat's Trail trench, but this concentration was broken up by the divisional artillery. That night 17th RF was relieved by 24th RF and marched back to rejoin 5th Bde in reserve to rest and refit.

In the following days the exposed Bourlon Salient, including the line that 2nd Division had defended, was evacuated as Third Army fell back to stronger positions. By the evening of 4 December the division's new covering line was occupied by 5th Bde, with 17th RF holding the right section at Lock 7 on the Canal du Nord. The divisional artillery caused heavy loses to the enemy next day as they advanced to follow up. 17th RF was already holding nearly 2,000 yards (1,800 m) of front, and on 7 December was ordered to establish three outposts 500 yards (460 m) in front of the main line, which it did at dawn next day. The battalion was in constant contact with the enemy and there were bombing engagements and shelling all day, but the battle had finally ended, with 2nd Division holding the main line of resistance that Third Army would retain through the winter.

=== Winter 1917–18 ===
Nevertheless, Third Army remained in a relatively exposed position (the Flesquières Salient) through the winter, though the trenches were strengthened as much as possible by the troops in the line. On 21 December D Company of 17th RF fought off a raid by inexperienced German troops who forgot to pull the strings of their stick grenades before throwing them. On 3/4 January 1918 2nd Division was relieved and went back for rest and training, with 5th Bde round Beaulencourt. It returned to the La Vacquerie sector on 22/23 January, occupying wet and exposed trenches.

By early 1918 the BEF was suffering a manpower crisis. Brigades were reduced from four to three battalions, and surplus war-formed battalions were broken up to provide reinforcements for others. Within 2nd Division 6th Bde lost two battalions in this way and 17th RF was transferred to it on 6 February 1918, where it served alongside 1st King's (Liverpool Regiment) and 2nd South Staffordshire Regiment.

=== German Spring Offensive ===
It was anticipated that the Germans would soon launch their Spring Offensive, and raids were mounted to gain intelligence of their intentions. On the night of 16/17 March 17th RF sent out a fighting patrol, but it only found a German notice-board. The following night a 12-man party from 17th RF with artillery and mortar support raided the lines opposite 'Anchor Sap' where much enemy movement had been observed. The raiders killed several Germans and came back with their shoulder-straps for identification, together with information on the trench system opposite, for the cost of two casualties. On 20 March the battalion observed enemy staff officers in the front trench and hundreds of enemy troops in full packs and equipment moving up into the trenches. The enemy had been heavily bombarding the Flesquières Salient with Phosgene and Mustard gas shells and so many men were out of action that 2nd Division was relieved on the night of 20/21 March (on 22 March 17th RF only had 16 officers and 428 ORs). It was in reserve at Rocquigny when the German offensive was launched next morning. It made rapid progress against the flanks of the salient, endangering the communications of the troops holding it. By the end of 22 March the troops of V Corps in the salient were retreating towards their rear position or 'Green Line', which was wired but had only been dug about 3 feet (0.91 m) deep. On 23 March 17th RF was moved up from reserve to the Green Line, 'standing to' at 02.00, expecting an immediate attack. Lieutenant-Col Weston, now 17th RF's CO, was appointed outpost commander for 6th Bde. The Green line was heavily shelled at 10.00 and 13.00, and 17th (Northern) Division retreated through it at 14.00, making it the front line, but it was not until 16.50 that the enemy were seen entering Velu Wood and soon afterwards shells began bursting all over the division's rear areas. The Germans were already in Bus, and by the end of 23 March 2 and 63rd (Royal Naval) Divisions were squeezed into a small square salient round Bertincourt with gaps on either flank, while many of the men were still suffering from the effects of gas.

The fighting of 24 March became known as the First Battle of Bapaume because Third Army was forced to evacuate that town during the day. 17th RF began the day in reserve behind 6th Bde, formed up in two lines, each of two companies. 2nd Division had been ordered to begin evacuating the Bertincourt Salient at 09.15, but 5th Bde went back too far, so 6th Bde was isolated when the German attacked out of Velu Wood at 09.35. The first attack was beaten off, but a company of 1st King's was almost annihilated and 17th RF had to rush up two platoons to reinforce it. By 10.45 the brigade line was steadied, with 2nd South Staffs and two companies of 17th RF forming a defensive left flank facing the gap to 5th Bde. A new attack came in immediately, outflanking the division, which had to retire to the Red Line. 5th and 6th Brigades (99th Bde was detached) retreated, holding back the advancing enemy as best they could. Finding that the Red Line only existed on maps, they continued on, Padre Gibson of 17th RF carrying a wounded man on his shoulders, until about 15.00 they reached the Bapaume–Péronne road. However, the enemy were in Combles and V Corps ordered a further retirement, so 2nd Division sent its two brigades (now only about 1000 strong in total) back to the Ligny-Thilloy–Eaucourt L'Abbaye line, leaving a rearguard on the road. 17th RF was the last unit to retire after fighting a stubborn rearguard action. On the night of 24 March 17th and 24th RF assembled just east of Ligny-Thilloy, and as they had broken contact with the enemy were able to march back along the Bapaume–Albert road and join 6th Bde in positions between Pys and Le Sars. 17th RF took the left of the line next to 51st (H) Division. On 25 March they met the advancing Germans with rifle and machine gun fire, but Grévillers and Bihucourt to the north fell, and 2nd Division was out of touch with its neighbours to the south. At 13.10 the Germans began pushing through Le Sars and advancing on Courcelette under cover of smoke. 2nd Division began to pull back to Auchonvillers about 14.00, with A and B Companies of 17th RF (2 officers and about 100 men) providing a rearguard and collecting stragglers. At this point a brigadier of the neighbouring 51st (H) Division brought orders from V Corps to stand at all costs. With his 100 men, almost out of ammunition, and gathering a company from 24th RF that had just passed through his position, Lt-Col Weston. promised to do his best. The three companies were stretched out manning a series of shell-holes along a ridge, which came under heavy artillery fire at 14.30. With the support of the divisional artillery, this party held off the advancing Germans until 16.00, when they began to work round the right flank. Weston rushed up the battalion HQ staff, signallers, runners and anyone else he could find, and formed them into a flank guard. But now 51st (H) Division on the left also went back, and Weston with about 40 survivors finally retired down the road toward Miraumont. His second-in-command, Maj Pretty, with six men formed a final rearguard, of whom only one sergeant survived. That night 2nd Division was at Beaucourt, disposed to cover the crossings of the Ancre, but the Germans did not follow up. After a withdrawal to the old British front line of 1916 on 26 March, 17th RF took up positions near Beaumont-Hamel which marked the end of Third Army's retreat. Although fighting continued until 30 March, the battalion was left undisturbed in Aveluy Wood and suffered comparatively lightly during the shelling. On 30 March its strength stood at only 10 officers and 481 ORs

6th Brigade was relieved on 3/4 April and went for rest and training, absorbing a few reinforcements, but the rest was short and it was back in the line south of Arras on 15 April. Both side's positions were poorly developed, with few communication trenches. The day after its arrival 6th Bde was raided up a sunken road leading across No man's land, and 1st King's was heavily attacked, being replaced by 17th RF that evening. Regular raiding by both sides continued over the following months, with 2nd Division taking a spell out of the line in the second half of June to train recently arrived US troops. The units slowly recovered their strength. On the night of 28/29 June young soldiers of 17th RF carried out a raid under cover of a barrage by the divisional artillery: the enemy had evacuated their positions, but the officers were impressed with how well the replacements performed their tasks.

=== Hundred Days Offensive ===
The Allies launched their own Hundred Days Offensive at the Battle of Amiens on 8 August. On 14 August 2nd Division received orders to capture the Ablainzevelle–Moyennville Ridge in front of their positions. 99th Brigade was to carry out the initial assault, so on 17/18 August it was relieved by 6th Bde in order to rehearse the operation. On the evening of 20 August 99th Bde returned to the line, while 17th RF went back to the 'Stork' support trenches. At 04.55 next morning the surprise barrage opened up and 99th Bde attacked through the mist with tank support; 6th Bde remained concentrated ready to move up, but were not needed (however, 17th RF had 92 men put out of action by gas). The follow-up attack was fixed for 23 August: this time all three brigades of 2nd Division were to pass through 3rd Division after it had secured Gomiécourt during the night. The division assembled on the Ablainzevelle Ridge at 08.00 and moved up to the railway before Zero hour at 11.00. 6th Brigade, with six Whippet tanks was to attack Ervillers. It disposed 1st King's on the left, supported by 17th RF. Although the enemy put down a heavy barrage on the railway just after zero, and four of the tanks broke down, the leading waves of 6th Bde quickly broke down the opposition, capturing Ervillers and consolidating a line beyond it. Companies of 17th RF were deployed to safeguard the open left flank, where the Guards Division was held up, and the battalion captured five German field guns. 5th and 99th Brigades had not done so well, nevertheless 6th Bde was ordered to push forward alone that night and occupy the ridge at Mory Copse. However, it was a moonlit night and the enemy was very active, so it made little progress. The following afternoon 99th Bde took Mory Copse employing a set-piece attack with tanks behind a barrage. 6th Brigade was to follow up with an attack on the ridge between Béhagnies and Mory, but when 17th RF went forward at 17.05 it came under enfilade fire and was forced to dig in. While 6th and 99th Bdes were withdrawn that night, 5th Bde captured Béhagnies and Sapignies (its original objectives for 23 August) in a surprise attack early next morning, completing the division's tasks. 6th Brigade then bivouacked beyond Ayette as 2nd Division became VI Corps' support division for a week.

With the return of semi-mobile warfare, Maj-Gen Cecil Pereira commanding 2nd Division now arranged that each battalion would have at least a battery of the divisional field artillery attached to it with a liaison officer who could call down fire support if the infantry met opposition. VI Corps attacked again at the Battle of Drocourt-Quéant Line on 2 September. 2nd Division in reserve assigned 6th Bde to move forward if required. The attack by 62nd (2nd West Riding) Division began well, and although 6th Bde was ordered up at 11.00 it was not engaged. That night 2nd Division relieved 62nd with orders to continue the attack on 3 September. It advanced at 05.20 with 6th Bde on the right, A and B Companies of 17th RF leading, with artillery and tank support. Yet the attackers encountered no opposition, occupying the objective by 06.30 having advanced about 5,000 yards (4,600 m). V Corps realised that the enemy had retired and at 10.00 ordered the divisions to form advanced guards and follow up. Pereira ordered 6th Bde forward with a squadron from the Queen's Own Oxfordshire Hussars and six Whippets. It was not until 13.00 that the cavalry and tanks moved off, but by 14.20 they had reached the Hermies–Demicourt ridge, overlooking the valley beyond which lay the Hindenburg Line and Canal du Nord. At first the adjutant could not find the leading companies of 17th RF to deliver the orders, but they followed up at 14.30, sustaining a few casualties from shellfire, until they were held up by machine gun fire from Boursies. Two platoons of C Company went up to reinforce B Company and the advance was resumed at 18.20 with artillery support, capturing Demicourt and Boursies. The battalion had been advancing for 13 hours, covering some 9,500 yards (8,700 m) at a cost of 52 casualties. Next morning 1st King's passed through 17th RF's outposts and set off to secure the line of the canal and locate the enemy's positions; it only got half-way, because the enemy were much more active, bombing parties driving in the left flank company of 17th RF. 6th Brigade made another attempt to get forward at 22.00 but was held up by Germans defending 'the Spoil Heap' (though they evacuated it later in the night). 6th Brigade was relieved early in the evening of 5 September.

2nd Division's attack at the Battle of Havrincourt on 11 September was carried out by 5th Bde, which was then relieved by 6th Bde on 13/14 September. The whole of 2nd Division was relieved two nights later and went into VI Corps Reserve, with 6th Bde at Ervillers. It went back up to Demicourt and Doignies on 26 September to prepare for the Battle of the Canal du Nord, part of a coordinated series of attacks all along the Western Front by the Allies. Zero was at 05.20 and 2nd Division, led by 6th Bde, was to cross the canal behind Guards Division and take over the lead if required. By 10.45 17th RF with the brigade trench mortar battery (6th TMB) and a section of 5th Field Company had closed up to the canal at Lock 7 (where it fought the previous December). As they crossed they were bombed by a German aircraft, which scored three direct hits, 17th RF suffering 32 casualties. About 11.40 17th RF and 6th TMB were ordered to move north of Flesquières, ahead of which Guards Division was held up at the Graincourt line. The brigade then passed through the Guards, 1st King's and 2nd South Staffs capturing Orival Wood, then 6th Bde was ordered to capture Caintaing Trench and Support. It attacked behind a barrage and a smokescreen and captured the Graincourt line, but the Guards had not secured Premy Chapel on the flank and no further advance towards Caintaing was possible. 2nd Division was ordered to attack Caintaing next morning and then go on to seize crossings over the Escaut River and St Quentin Canal. The barrage fell on Caintaing Trench and Support at 05.15 and when it started creeping forwards 10 minutes later 6th Bde followed, meeting no opposition. About 11.00 Brigadier-General Willan of 6th Bde suggested to 17th RF's CO that it might be possible to get across the water obstacles by floating a raft down the river under the canal arches, and then landing on the far (east) bank of the canal. The REs made a raft and D Company with a platoon of B Company made the attempt at dusk. The raft was not a success, being unable to pass under the arches, but the fusiliers got across the canal bridge and even gained a footing in Marcoing Trench beyond. They could not hold it under intense machine gun fire, but they clung onto their position across the canal for the night. At 03.00 a counter-attack against the neighbouring division swept some of the fusiliers back, but 17th RF held on until 99th Bde advanced next morning. At 10.50 a report reached battalion HQ that the enemy was retiring from the canal, and soon afterwards 17th RF was able to push on and secure Marcoing Trench. Later that day 5th Field Company began laying bridges, and 17th RF could withdraw to billets in Noyelles.

6th Brigade did not take part in 2nd Division's attack on Mont sur l'Oeuvre on 1 October, but was back in the line for the Battle of Cambrai on 8 October. It supported 99th Bde's initial attack, then 17th RF passed through to take the second objective (the Green Line) in the evening, capturing Forenville and establishing positions on the Green Line, with a left defensive flank. Due to a lack of bombs, the battalion had not been able to 'mop up' all the dugouts it had bypassed; the CO borrowed a company and some pack animals carrying bombs and ammunition from 23rd RF, and the fusiliers proceeded to round up the prisoners. 17th RF's casualties had been slight. Next day the Guards Division passed through to continue pursuing the defeated Germans to the River Selle, while 2nd Division returned to the Canal du Nord in Corps Reserve.

The Battle of the Selle began on 17 October, and on 19 October 2nd Division closed up to join in. It was now organised into semi-independent Brigade Groups with their own support troops. The division was ordered to pass through Guards Division and attack on 23 October. 5th Brigade Group carried out the 23 October attack, 99th then attacked the next day, while 6th Bde Gp stayed in the Niergnies area. It moved up to Saint-Python on 24 October, but as the Germans were retreating rapidly it was not needed before 2nd Division was relieved. 17th RF and Brigade HQ settled into Vertain for rest. After a short spell in the front line, when little happened except some desultory shelling, 2nd Division was again relieved, but not before 17th and 24th RF had carried out the division's last actions of the war. On the night of 30 October–1 November both battalions raided the enemy positions. At 02.00 an officer and 25 men of 17th RF attacked La Folie Farm, capturing two German officers and 7 ORs, who were found in a cellar and offered no resistance. 6th Brigade then went back to Solesmes. Over the next few days it followed the advance of Third Army as a reserve division.

When the Armistice with Germany brought hostilities to an end on 11 November, 2nd Division was billeted north of Le Quesnoy, with 6th Bde at Preux-au-Sart.

== Post-Armistice ==
After the Armistice 2nd Division was selected to be part of the Army of Occupation, and 6th Bde Group closed up to Bermeries–Mecquignies before beginning its advance to the Rhine by marching to Maubeuge on 18 November. The division proceeded by slow stages, marching through Spa and entering Germany on 9 December, reaching its assigned station between Düren and Cologne on 27 December. In February orders were issued for the formation of the British Army of the Rhine: 2nd Division was converted into the Light Division and most of its units were reduced to cadres and returned home. However, 17th and 23rd RF were selected to form 124th Bde in the new London Division.

As time-expired men were demobilised, 17th RF was kept up to strength by absorbing 51st (Service) Bn, RF, (a former training battalion from the UK) on 3 April, and later the remaining personnel of 1/1st Honourable Artillery Company Infantry Bn when that unit was disembodied. 17th (Service) Battalion, Royal Fusiliers (Empire) was disbanded on 26 October 1919 on the Rhine.

== World War II ==
A new 17th Royal Fusiliers was raised during World War II, initially as a pioneer battalion. It formed on 9 March (or 1 May) 1940 at Alnwick in Northumberland and was sent to defend Amble harbour, building pillboxes and erecting barbed wire. On 24 October it was converted into infantry and assigned to 141st (5th London) Brigade in 47th (London) Infantry Division, first at Monmouth, then guarding the invasion-threatened Sussex coast around Lewes and Newhaven. In 1942 the division moved to the Hampshire & Dorset District, where as well as carrying out intensive training 17th RF was given a counter-attack role in the defence of Gosport and Lee-on-Solent airfields. However, 47th Division had been placed on a 'lower establishment', indicating that it was unlikely to be sent overseas; instead its units sent drafts of reinforcements to battalions serving abroad. In October 1942 the battalion transferred to 140th (4th London) Brigade alongside 11th and 12th Royal Fusiliers, then in December 1942 it moved to 144th Brigade in 48th Infantry (Reserve) Division, first at Woodhall Spa then at Osgodby Moor Camp at Market Rasen. Here its role was purely as a training battalion, large numbers of untrained men being posted to it, though many were too old or unfit. Nevertheless, it sent 1600–1800 trained men overseas before being disbanded on 18 November 1943, many of the remaining personnel going to 11th and 12th RF.

== Insignia ==
The cap badge of the Royal Fusiliers was a 'grenade' with the Tudor rose surrounded by a garter with the motto 'Honi Soit Qui Mal y Pense' superimposed on the 'bomb' of the grenade. When it comprised four RF battalions as part of 33rd Division, 99th Bde adopted coloured cloth 'grenade' badges sewn onto the back of the uniform to identify individual battalions: 17th RF wore these in red. 2nd Division did not employ such 'battle flashes'. 2nd Division's formation sign was a black oval with three 8-pointed stars, the centre one red, flanked by two smaller white stars.

== Memorials ==
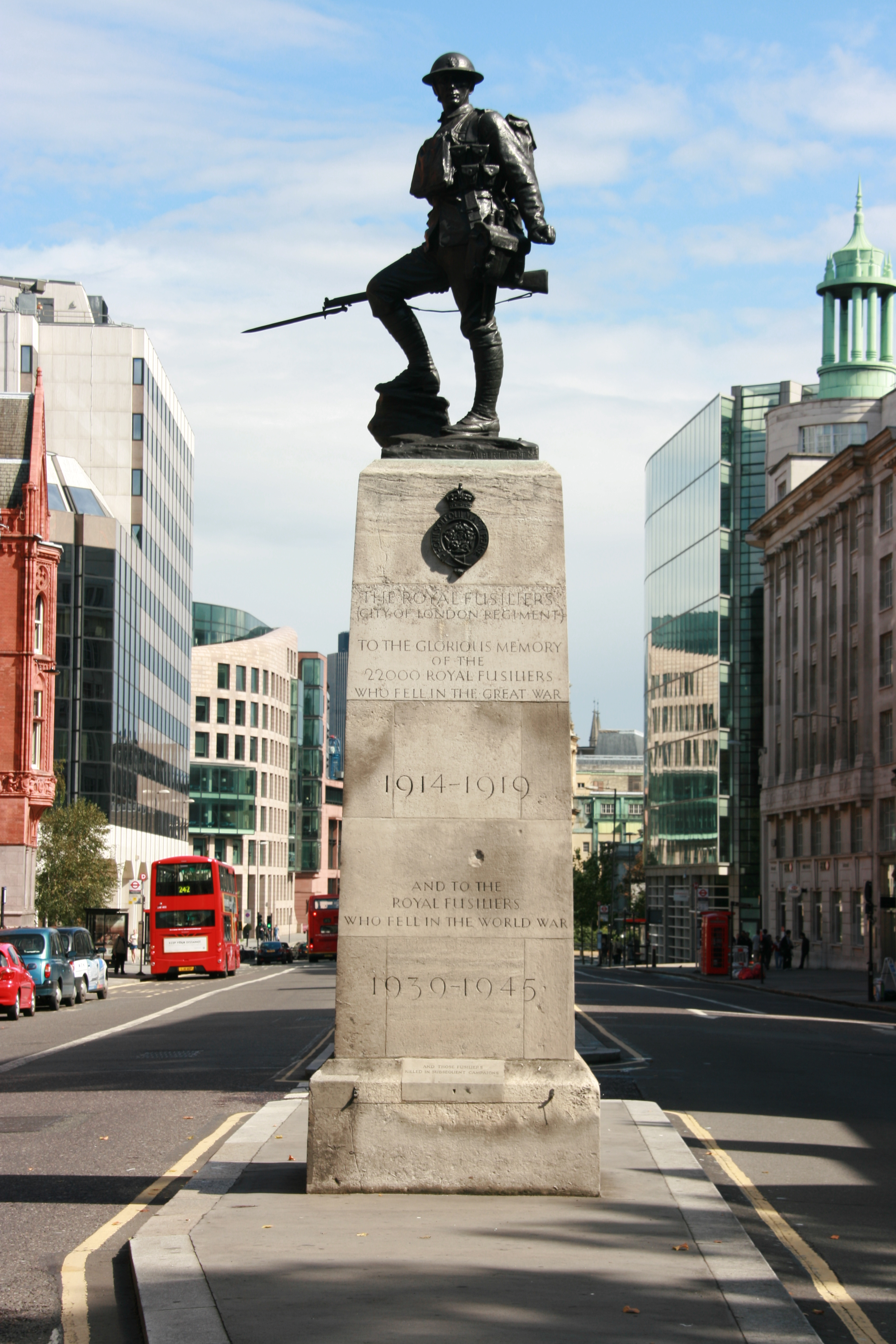
Royal Fusiliers War Memorial on High Holborn.

A memorial tablet to the 565 members of all ranks of the 17th (Service) Battalion, Royal Fusiliers who died in 1914–19 is adjacent to the pulpit in All Saints' Church, Warlingham, where the battalion trained.

The Royal Fusiliers War Memorial, with its bronze figure of a Fusilier sculpted by Albert Toft, stands at Holborn Bar on the boundary of the City of London. A panel on the back of the pedestal lists all the RF battalions.

There are three memorials to 2nd Division in World War I in Aldershot, the division's peacetime base: a cross at the junction of Hospital Road and Knollys Road, a tablet in the Royal Garrison Church, and a set of memorial gates to 1st and 2nd Divisions. There is also a memorial to 2nd Division in York at the site of the medieval palace of the Archbishop of York.

The body of Capt Walter Stone, VC, was never recovered and he is commemorated on the Cambrai Memorial to the Missing. He (together with a brother also killed in action during the war) is commemorated on a Stone family memorial in Greenwich Cemetery.
