= 22nd (Service) Battalion, Royal Fusiliers (Kensington) =

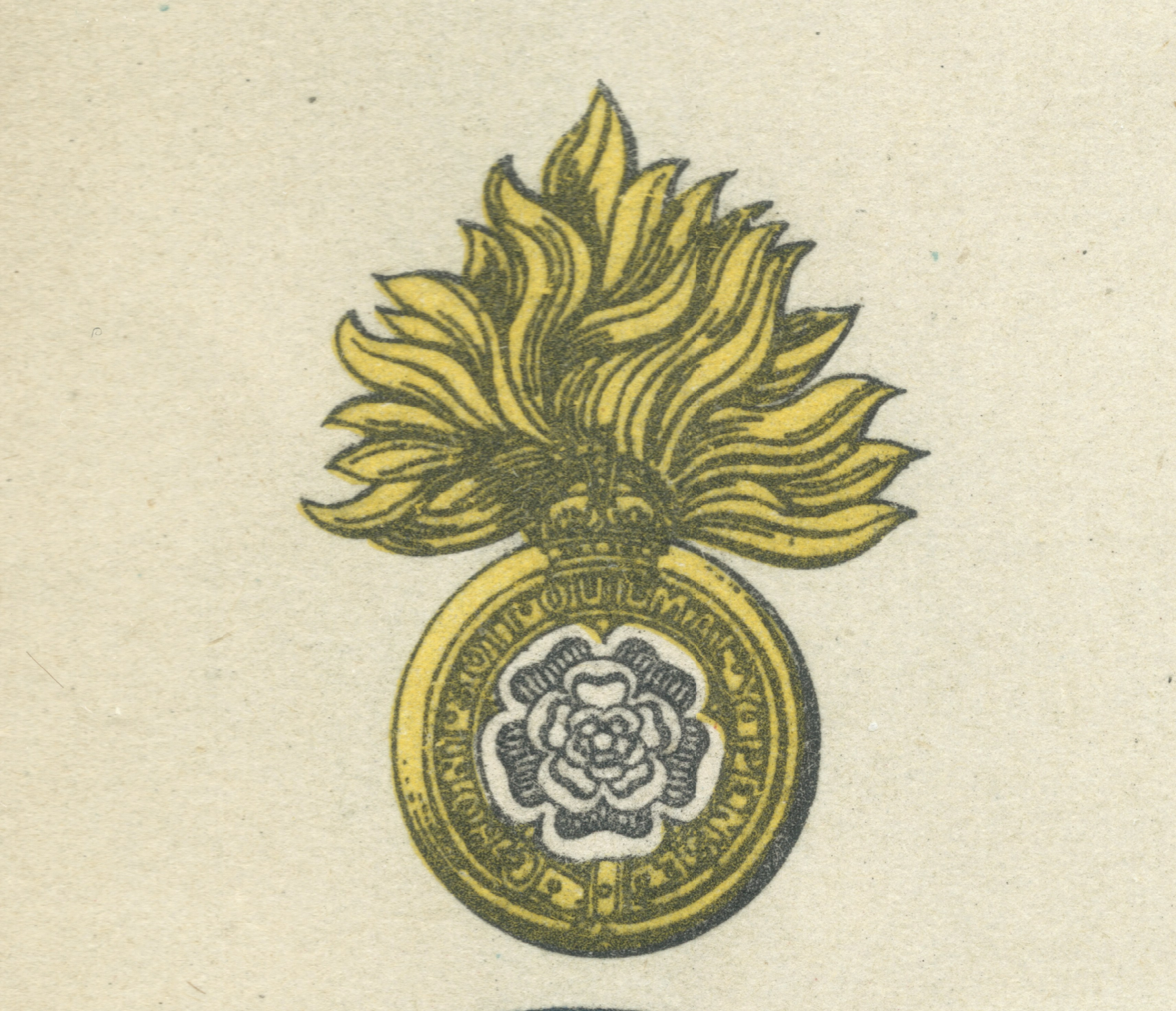
- Cap badge of the Royal Fusiliers
- Active: 11 September 1914–5 February 1918
- Allegiance: United Kingdom
- Branch: New Army
- Type: Pals battalion
- Role: Infantry
- Size: One Battalion
- Part of: 33rd Division; 2nd Division
- Garrison/HQ: Kensington
- Patron: Mayor and Borough of Kensington
- Engagements: Vimy Ridge; Delville Wood; Guillemont; The Quadrilateral; Grevillers; Oppy Wood; Cambrai

Commanders
- Notable commanders: Lt-Col Randle Barnett Barker, DSO*

The 22nd (Service) Battalion, Royal Fusiliers (Kensington) was a 'Pals battalion' raised in London for 'Kitchener's Army' in World War I. Half of the volunteers came from the Royal Borough of Kensington, the other half were 'Colonials' from around the British Empire. This unusual battalion served on the Western Front from November 1915 until its disbandment in February 1918, seeing action at the Somme, the Ancre, Arras and Cambrai.

== Recruitment ==
Alfred Leete's recruitment poster for Kitchener's Army.

On 6 August 1914, less than 48 hours after Britain's declaration of war, Parliament sanctioned an increase of 500,000 men for the Regular British Army. The newly appointed Secretary of State for War, Earl Kitchener of Khartoum, issued his famous call to arms: 'Your King and Country Need You', urging the first 100,000 volunteers to come forward. This group of six divisions with supporting arms became known as Kitchener's First New Army, or 'K1'. The K2, K3 and K4 battalions, brigades and divisions followed soon afterwards. But the flood of volunteers overwhelmed the ability of the Army to absorb them, and the K5 units were largely raised by local initiative rather than at regimental depots, often from men from particular localities or backgrounds who wished to serve together: these were known as 'Pals battalions'. The 'Pals' phenomenon quickly spread across the country, as local recruiting committees offered complete units to the War Office (WO). One such unit was offered by the Mayor (William Davison) and Borough of Kensington in London following a public meeting on 11 September 1914 and accepted by the WO the same day. Some groups enrolled in the battalion together, for example from Whiteleys department store in Queensway, and Notting Hill Rugby Club, but Kensington volunteers had already filled the 13th (County of London) Battalion, London Regiment (Kensington) of the Territorial Force to its full establishment strength of 1100 men, and formed its 2nd Line battalion. The flood of volunteers was ebbing, and Davison feared that he would not get the 1100 required, despite extending recruitment to neighbouring Hammersmith and to Regent Street Polytechnic. King Edward's Horse (known as the King's Overseas Dominions Regiment) had filled its second regiment from 'Colonials' in London but was also struggling to fill an additional infantry battalion. The General Officer Commanding London District, Major-General Sir Francis Lloyd, suggested that the two battalions should merge and this was done. A and B Companies of the new 22nd (Service) Battalion of the Royal Fusiliers (City of London Regiment) (22nd RF), were Colonials, while C and D were from Kensington. Major Archibald Innes, formerly of the Rifle Brigade, who had won a Distinguished Service Order (DSO) in the Boer War, was recommended as commanding officer (CO) by one of the Kensington Aldermen, and Captain Randle Barnett Barker, formerly of the Royal Welch Fusiliers and a relative of the mayor's wife, was appointed second-in-command. At one of the early parades Lieutenant-Colonel Innes asked the assembled recruits whether they wanted to be known as the 'Imperial', 'Colonial' or 'Kensington' battalion, but pointed out that if they chose the latter they would be 'adopted' by the royal borough. That is what was chosen.

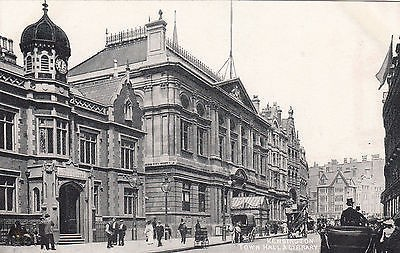
Old Kensington Town Hall, where the early recruits were enlisted.

== Training ==
The recruits assembled at the White City exhibition grounds in Hammersmith. Drill was carried out at Wormwood Scrubs. Training was hindered by the same shortages of weapons, equipment and instructors as the other Kitchener battalions, although the Kensingtons were able to place contracts with local firms such as Harrods, Lillywhites and Derry & Toms, and its men were clothed in khaki service dress while many other units had to make do with temporary blue uniforms. White City became so crowded, with troops of the Territorial Force (TF) also using the site, that on 27 October the Kensington battalion moved to Roffey Park at Horsham, Sussex, with the men billeted in local homes until huts could be built. Drill was carried out in Denne Park and manoeuvres at Plummers Plain and Mannings Heath. E Company was formed at Roffey as the battalion reserve company, later joined by F Company.

The battalion was assigned to 120th Brigade of 40th Division, which were renumbered 99th Brigade and 33rd Division in May 1915. This brigade consisted of the 17th (Empire), 22nd (Kensington), 23rd (1st Sportsman's) and 24th (2nd Sportsman's) service battalions of the Royal Fusiliers. In June 22nd RF, less E and F Companies, moved to Clipstone Camp in Nottinghamshire, where 33rd Division was concentrating. At the beginning of August the division moved to Tidworth Camp for final battle training on Salisbury Plain, where Lt-Col Innes moved to take command of 27th (Reserve) Bn (see below) and Maj Barker was promoted to succeed him in command of 22nd RF.

=== 27th (Reserve) Battalion ===
The two reserve companies of the 22nd RF remained at Horsham when the battalion departed for Clipstone Camp in June 1915. In August they were joined by the reserve companies of the 17th (Empire) battalion from Warlingham in Surrey and formed into 27th (Reserve) Battalion, commanded by Lt-Col Innes from the 22nd RF. The 32nd (East Ham) Battalion, RF, was formed in October 1915 and eventually its reserve companies also joined 27th (R) Bn. In November the battalion moved to Oxford as part of 24th Reserve Brigade (an all-Royal Fusiliers brigade), and in April 1916 the brigade moved to Edinburgh. On 1 September 1916 the Local Reserve battalions were transferred to the Training Reserve and 27th (R) Bn RF became 103rd Training Reserve Battalion, though the training staff retained their Royal Fusiliers badges. The battalion was disbanded on 14 December 1917 at Catterick Camp.

== Service ==
On 4 November 1915, 33rd Division was ordered to move to France, to join the British Expeditionary Force (BEF) fighting on the Western Front. On 6 November 22nd RF entrained at Tidworth Station for Folkestone, where it embarked for Boulogne. By 21 November the whole division had concentrated at Morbecque. BEF policy was to even up the experience between its New Army and Regular Army formations by exchanging brigades and then distributing the experienced Regular battalions through the New Army formations. On 25 November 99th Bde moved to Béthune where it transferred to 2nd Division in exchange for 19th Bde. Then on 13 December it exchanged two Royal Fusiliers Pals battalions for Regular battalions from 2nd Division, so that 22nd (Kensington) and 23rd (1st Sportsman's) battalions were now brigaded with 1st Royal Berkshire Regiment, 1st King's Royal Rifle Corps (KRRC), and for a short time 1/5th King's (Liverpool Regiment), an attached TF battalion that would soon join its own division.

2nd Division's formation sign.

When 99th Bde joined, 2nd Division was holding the line in the Cuinchy sector, where the raw Pals battalions were introduced to Trench warfare by the experienced battalions. Parties from 22nd RF spent 24 hours at a time with the Berkshires and KRRC, and then by companies with 1/5th King's, when it suffered its first casualties from shellfire. On 16–20 and 23–26 December the battalion took over its own section of the line for the first time, near Cambrin. From 30 December to 25 January 1916 the division trained round Busnes, then returned to the Béthune sector, where the battalions began rotating between front line and reserve trenches at Festubert and Givenchy. 22nd Royal Fusiliers received its first draft of reinforcements from 27th Bn, but had to transfer a number of men to help form the brigade Trench Mortar Battery (TMB). On 28 February 2nd Division relieved a French division south of Lens and on 5 March 22nd RF went into the trenches at Souchez. It spent the next two months in this area, alternating spells in the line with training and providing working parties.

=== Vimy Ridge ===
On 21 May the Germans put in a major attack on the British positions on Vimy Ridge, preceded by a heavy bombardment and the explosion of a mine. The attack overwhelmed the forward positions of 47th (1/2nd London) Division. 2nd Division was ordered up from reserve in buses and lorries and next day 99th Bde relieved 140th (4th London) Brigade and prepared to make a counter-attack from the reserve trenches to recover the lost ground. The attack was twice postponed in order to carry out artillery preparation, but was retimed for 20.25 with 22nd RF on the right, 1st Berkshire on the left, 1st KRRC in support and 23rd RF in reserve. However, just before the attack was launched the Germans put down a heavy bombardment on the attacking battalions, with a barrage behind them to cut them off. The acting COs of both battalions (Maj Roston of 22nd RF and his opposite number of 1st Berks) sent messages back to Brigade HQ that they could not attack (though the divisions either side managed to attack). Lieutenant-Col Barker of 22nd RF had been at Brigade HQ and volunteered to go forward through the barrage and clear things up: he replaced the Berks with the KRRC and reorganised the start time for 01.30, but 47th Division advised that moonrise at 01.00 made that impractical. Eventually Barker received an order to cancel the attack. However, Nos 5 and 8 Platoons of B Company, 22nd RF, had not received the first cancellation order and had gone forward as scheduled at 20.25, accompanied by a few men from 226th Field Company, Royal Engineers. They got into the enemy front trench and held it for an hour and a half, but being unsupported they had to retire through the barrage to rejoin B Company, suffering heavy casualties. The battalion was relieved by 1st Berkshires, having suffered total casualties of 3 officers wounded (one fatally) 7 other ranks (ORs) killed and 78 wounded during the evening. The battalion moved back into the same trenches on 26 May, working hard to improve the former reserve line, and suffering further casualties. It then returned to the usual rotation of trench duties. (Note: A lightly fictionalised account of the 23 May action, No 8 Platoon, in which the salient facts are substantially accurate, was written by H.E. Harvey, DCM, MM, of 22nd RF.)

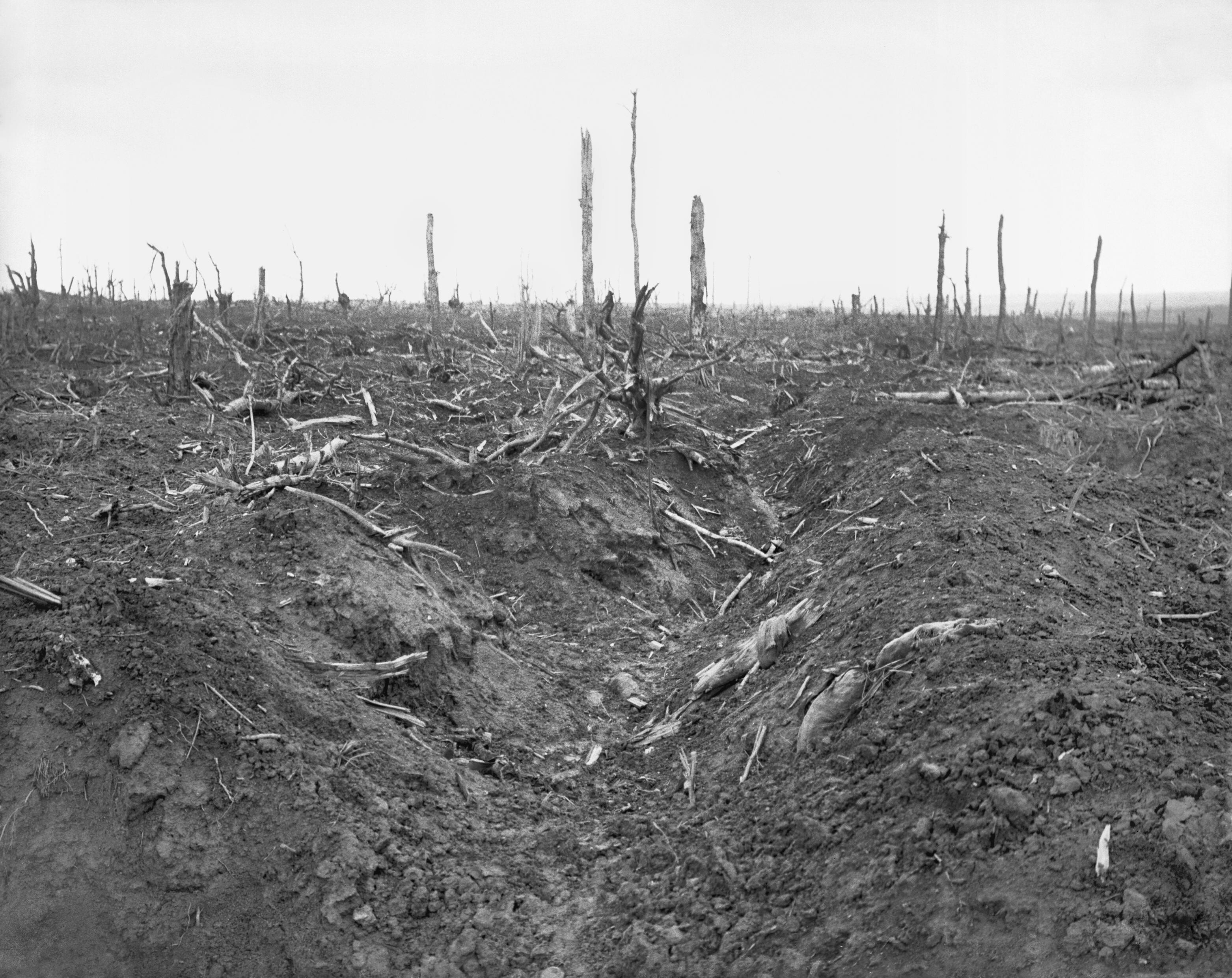
An abandoned German trench in Delville Wood.

=== Delville Wood ===
That summer's 'Big Push' (the Battle of the Somme) opened on 1 July, and on 15 July 2nd Division was withdrawn from the Vimy front for training. On 20 July it was sent south to join in the offensive and on the night of 24/25 July 99th Bde relieved a brigade of 3rd Division at Montauban. They faced Delville Wood, which had already withstood several attacks. Major Harman and two companies of 22nd RF were assigned as the garrison of Montauban village. The other two companies were in some trenches north of 'The Quarry', and suffered casualties from shelling next day, including the new tear gas and phosgene gas shells. 99th Brigade then attacked on 27 July. The assaulting waves formed up during the night, with C and D Companies of 22nd RF in Bernafay Wood as brigade reserve, the other two companies detailed as carrying parties for the attacking battalions. The assault went in at 07.20 after a 70-minute bombardment of the enemy trenches and succeeded in clearing the rest of Delville Wood. Thereafter the wood was subjected to heavy German shelling, as was the British starting line, making it difficult to get supplies up to the fighting as the Germans threw in fierce counter-attacks. The two carrying companies of 22nd RF took bombs and ammunition to 1st KRRC, and also defended their flank on the eastern face of the wood. The other two companies moved up to the support line in Longueval Alley, which was under heavy shellfire. The brigade was relieved before daybreak next day, two companies of 22nd RF going back to Montauban and one further back, but one remained in Longueval Alley under shellfire. The rest of 2nd Division held off strong counter-attacks next day. On 29 July A and B Companies returned to their Montauban defences while C and D went behind the village. At Delville Wood the battalion lost 1 officer killed and 4 wounded, 26 ORs killed, 143 wounded and 20 missing. When roll-call was taken on 29 July, the battalion was down to 18 officers and 400 ORs, though nearly 50 stragglers came in over succeeding days.

While the rest of 2nd Division attacked at the Battle of Guillemont on 30–31 July, 22nd RF was back in Delville Wood, where Lt-Col Barker reorganised the defences to emphasise firepower (12 Lewis Guns of the battalion and 8 Vickers guns of 99th Brigade Machine Gun Company). During the battalion's four-day tour of duty the wood was constantly shelled and subjected to probing attacks. The division made another attack on Guillemont on 8 August, when 22nd RF was employed carrying ammunition. The division then moved to the quieter Hébuterne sector, 22nd RF doing trench duty and fatigues, including carrying up gas cylinders for a cloud gas attack on 5 September. Lieutenant-Col Barker, who had been awarded a DSO for his work at Delville Wood, was acting brigade commander and was ordered to put on raids and active patrolling to draw attention from the British attack at Flers–Courcelette on 15 September. One raid by 22nd RF that night with artillery support was particularly successful. The division then went to rest and train in Corps Reserve for the remainder of the month.

=== Ancre ===
On 30 September 22nd RF marched to trenches at the northern end of Redan Ridge in the River Ancre sector. When it was not in the line, it took part in training for an attack scheduled for mid-October, rehearsing the attack against dummy trenches. The battalion was in the line on 20 October when the Germans expected the attack and shelled the trenches heavily. However the attack was repeatedly postponed. By early November sickness rates in the battalion rose sharply due to the bad weather. The attack (the Battle of the Ancre) was finally made on 13 November. On 2nd Division's front the initial assault was made by 5th and 6th Bdes, with 99th Bde in reserve. 22nd and 23rd RF were under orders to move forward ready to support these attacks. 22nd RF and a section of 99th MG Company moved up into 'Sixth Avenue' just after midnight. When the assault was launched at 05.45, 5th Brigade achieved all its objectives quickly, but 6th Bde struggled through the mud and got left behind by its creeping barrage, and the attack by 3rd Division to its north completely failed. 22nd RF and its MG section were ordered to form a defensive flank facing north to cover the exposed flank of 5th Bde while the rest of 99th Bde continued the attack next day. It moved out into No man's land at 04.30 on 14 November to gain touch with the flank battalion of 5th Bde and form a line facing the old German strongpoint of the Quadrilateral. C Company, leading, linked with 5th Bde but B Company got lost in the mist and boggy ground. D and later A Companies then completed the line across to 6th Bde, with B Company in reserve. They held this position while the rest of 99th Bde attacked towards Munich Trench. During the day 13th Essex Regiment of 6th Bde dug a new communication trench up to the Quadrilateral and fed troops to help 22nd RF, which also had detachments from several other units under its command.That night there were still Germans holding out in part of the Quadrilateral, and early on 15 November A, B and D Companies of 22nd RF with help from 'Barker's Mixed Force' began an attack to clear them out. Two tanks sent to help bogged down and the fighting went on all day until strongpoints established on the high ground of Redan Ridge by the Fusiliers made the German positions untenable and they evacuated them. The battalion was relieved on 16 November.

=== Ancre Heights ===
2nd Division moved into the back areas to refit and train, with 22nd RF at Yvrench. On 13 January 1917 it returned to the Somme front, taking over a line of individual posts on the Ancre Heights facing Petit Miraumont. 22nd RF was in reserve until 28/29 January. 99th Brigade under the temporary command of Lt-Col Barker took part in the attack on Boom Ravine at Petit Miraumont on 17 February. 1st KRRC (left) and 23rd RF (right) led. Two platoons of B Company 22nd RF were assigned to C Company of the KRRC for 'mopping up', with the rest of the company for carrying parties. D Company of 22nd RF were assigned to form a defensive flank for 23rd RF. A and C Companies would then continue the attack up to the second objective (South Miraumont Trench) on the higher ground beyond. The men formed up and lay down in the dark before Zero hour at 05.45, having been issued with chewing gum to reduce coughing. However, the Germans had gained details of the attack and began shelling heavily at 04.30, causing casualties. The British creeping barrage began at 05.45 and the troops began to advance behind it. Unfortunately there had been a thaw, the men were held up by the soft ground and lost the barrage, some of them also losing direction in the darkness. They reached the first objective but were raked with fire from the right, where a supporting attack had failed. Following up, 22nd RF's A and C Companies crossed Boom Ravine, but initially drifted to the north west before correcting their direction. They reached South Miraumont Trench but by then were weak and isolated, two platoons of C Company on the left being cut off and captured, and the rest slowly gave ground before helping to set up a defensive line just in front of Boom Ravine. Advancing up the right flank, D Company found the German wire uncut, and all its officers became casualties. Lance-Sergeant Frederick Palmer cut through the wire and led the remnants of the company forward to establish a trench block. He then went back to collect more bombs. On his return he was dazed by the explosion of a rifle grenade but rallied his party, and together with a Lewis gun team from 23rd RF they held off successive attacks, maintaining the defensive flank. By late afternoon the German counter-attacks against 99th Bde had been held off. 22nd RF's casualties in this partial success are not accurately recorded, but they are known to have been the battalion's heaviest so far: about 12 (out of 18) officers and 270–275 ORs. The battalion was temporarily reorganised into three rather than four companies: A/B, C and D. Lance-Sgt Palmer was awarded the Victoria Cross (VC) for his actions and was soon commissioned as a 2nd Lieutenant in the battalion.

Shortly after the action at Miraumont the Germans began retreating to their Hindenburg Line defences (Operation Alberich). 2nd Division began to follow up, with 99th Bde attacking the blocking position at Grevillers Trench near Irles on 10 March once the heavy artillery had come forward. The KRRC and Berks led the attack, with 22nd RF providing a company-sized carrying party for each battalion, and A/B Company supporting the attack with 8 Lewis guns from Grundy Trench. The operation cost fewer casualties (200) that the number of prisoners taken (227). The men of 22nd RF filled the supply dumps in the captured trench within an hour of Zero, and continued carrying supplies and stretchers all day.

=== Arras ===
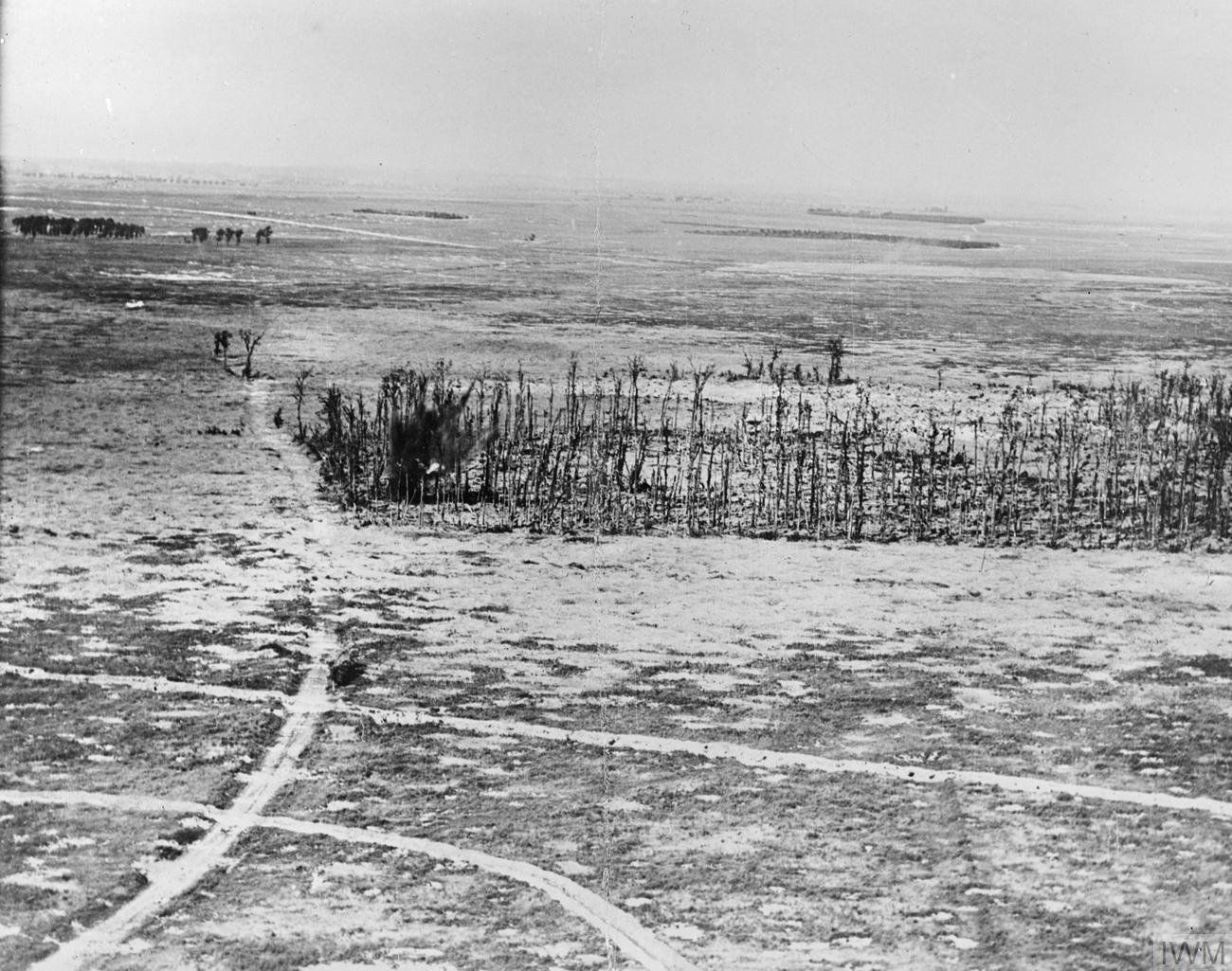
Oppy Wood from the air

On 24 March 2nd Division began moving north of Arras to join First Army for the forthcoming offensive, with 99th Bde at Tangry where it began refitting and training. 22nd RF was still very weak – now organised into just two companies – and the reinforcement drafts were barely trained and many of low medical category. The offensive began well with a successful attack at Vimy Ridge on 9 April. Two days later 22nd RF moved forward to take over the old German Support and Reserve Lines, and on 13 April to the new front line opposite Gavrelle, though the two companies could only cover a short front. The Germans then withdrew from the vulnerable villages beneath the ridge and fell back to a stronger position, 99th Bde following up. After a short rest 99th Bde went back into the line after 2nd Division's failed attack on Oppy Wood on 28 April. The brigade was ordered to attack at 03.00 next day, so there was no time for reconnaissance. 22nd RF formed the right of the brigade's attack, going forward with about 240 men organised as Right (B/C) and Left (D/A) Companies, with 1st KRRC supplying carrying parties and 50-man detachment to form a defensive flank. Some of the supply dumps of grenades and ammunition were blown up by enemy shellfire just before the attack. The battalion went forward after a 6-minute barrage, and was immediately faced by uncut wire: those men who got through the first belt were trapped by a second belt. On the extreme left 13 Platoon slipped through a gap alongside 1st Berks, but 14, 15 and 16 Platoons were cut to shreds by enemy fire. Right Company lost almost all its officers and one platoon almost immediately, but 2nd Lieutenant Jeffcoat found a way through the wire with his platoon, and engaged in a prolonged bombing fight with the Germans, joined by carrying parties from the 1st KRRC and men from the reserve battalion (23rd RF) that Lt-Col Barker was able to 'dribble' forward with all the. bombs he could obtain. Jeffcoat was able to join up with parties from 4th Bedfordshire Regiment and 1st Honourable Artillery Company of the neighbouring 63rd (Royal Naval) Division, which had been 'bombing' their way up the line towards 2nd Division. Although Jeffcoat was mortally wounded this mixed force handed over about 1,000 yards (910 m) of captured German trench when it was relieved in the evening. Only 40 men of 22nd RF returned from the attack that evening, though Lt-Col Barker was hopeful of finding another 60 amongst the mixed up units. He wrote to the Mayor of Kensington that 'the old Regt can't be rebuilt ... I shall have to make a new one'. In fact the total casualties were 163 out of 240.

Oppy Wood, 1917. Evening by John Nash.

2nd Division was required to make a further attack in the Oppy area on 3 May. It was so weak that it formed four composite battalions, with D Battalion consisting of three companies of 1st KRRC and a 100-strong composite company of 22nd RF under 2nd Lt Palmer. However, they got broken up on their way up to the line on 2 May and Palmer and his men were passed over to C Battalion (23rd RF and 1st Berks). C Battalion advanced alongside the Canadian Corps who advanced from Arleux to Fresnoy, but B Battalion on the right was held up. Palmer's 22nd RF company did good work in the middle, constructing and holding a strongpoint. It lost 24 men out of 100 engaged.

22nd RF, with 9 officers and 174 ORs, was the weakest battalion in a very weak division ('bled white' in the words of the Official History). 2nd Division was unfit for any offensive action for months to come, and was not involved in the Third Ypres Offensive that summer. On 7 May 22nd RF received a draft of 118 partially trained men, though some of the battalion's wounded were among them. Lieutenant-Col Barker received a Bar to his DSO for his work at Oppy. From 23 to 28 May the battalion – organised as two companies, as were all those in 99th Bde – took over battered trenches in the Arleux Loop, facing Fresnoy, which the Germans had recaptured. It began patrolling – three privates of 22nd RF found themselves trapped in No man's land, and stayed out for three days observing the enemy positions until they could get back. After a second tour in the Arleux Loop the battalion went to Bray for training. On 20 June the division was transferred to the Béthune sector, with 99th Bde at Cambrin, where the battalions rotated between front, support and reserve lines. Although there were no major attacks, there were frequent raids and patrols, while specialists such as bombers and Lewis gunners went on training courses. On 26 August 99th Bde marched to Beuvry and went into divisional reserve.

After a final tour in the Cambrin trenches from. 2 to 5 October, 22nd RF was sent to Raimbert, near Béthune, where it was greatly reinforced (304 men arriving between 3 and 24 October) and underwent intensive training ready for future operations. During this period it formed the 'Tump-Line Platoon' of older men of less fighting value, who specialised as carrying parties. On 8 November the battalion was moved to Herzeele, near Ypres, and training continued, but the Ypres offensive was ending. On 18 November Lt-Col Barker was promoted to command a brigade in 1st Division and Maj Phythian-Adams, an original member of the battalion, was promoted to succeed him.

=== Cambrai ===
On 20 November Third Army launched a surprise attack with tanks towards Cambrai. This succeeded in breaching the Hindenburg Line, but heavy fighting continued in Bourlon Wood. On the evening of 26 November 2nd Division relieved units of 36th (Ulster) Division astride the Bapaume–Cambrai road. 22nd RF had its battalion HQ in the captured Hindenburg Support Line, with A and B Companies north of the road in Kangaroo Trench, and C and D just east of the Canal du Nord. The following evening the battalion was ordered to relieve the exhausted 186th (2/2nd West Riding) Brigade in Bourlon Wood. Leaving B Company in Kangaroo Trench, the battalion went forward, arriving in the wood at 04.30 on 28 November and formed a defensive flank to 186th Bde's area. It stayed there all day under continuous shellfire. When it was withdrawn at 21.00 it had lost 3 officers wounded, 7 ORs killed and another 34 wounded. Meanwhile 22nd RF's positions in 99th Bde area had been filled by 17th RF, so the 22nd was temporarily under 5th Bde when a massive German counter-attack came in on the morning of 30 November. 22nd RF went up through the German barrage to the Canal du Nord, taking up position on the west bank at Lock 6, having lost only 7 wounded in the process. In the evening the battalion was moved further north along the canal to the Bapaume–Cambrai road crossing. On 1 December the adjoining 17th Middlesex Regiment sent up an SOS flare as they were about to be attacked. The left company of 22nd RF sent over a Lewis gun team and all the bombs they could spare, and the Tump-Line Platoon brought forward many more boxes of bombs. 5th Brigade ordered the battalion to widen and consolidate the front it was holding, and then it was passed to the command of 6th Bde. Half of C Company were sent across to assist 1st King's (Liverpool Regiment), which returned after the crisis had passed. Later two companies were sent to relieve the hard-pressed 13th Essex east of the canal, and one company to 2nd Highland Light Infantry in Kangaroo Trench, leaving a single company in position. One of the companies east of the canal was assigned to Canal trench, a sap pointing towards the enemy and thus vulnerable to attack from either side. With an attack expected next morning, 22nd RF worked to strengthen Canal trench, putting out wire to channel attackers into the fields of fire, while the Tump-Line Platoon carried up over 200 boxes of bombs and ammunition. Additional Lewis gun and bombing posts were also established on the canal bank. The attack came in at 17.15 on 2 December with heavy shelling, and small enemy parties trying to work down either side of Canal Trench. Those on the east side were caught by the Lewis guns and dispersed. It took longer to disperse the other group with bombs and Lewis guns. All was quiet by 18.30, and the battalion continued working to strengthen the position, having sustained perhaps 15 casualties. There was no attack on 3 December and the battalion was withdrawn from its exposed positions on the night of 4/5 December, though the defenders of the sap head had to fight off another attack before the withdrawal was complete, the battalion finally getting away unobserved by the enemy. From 30 November to 5 December the battalion had lost 4 officers wounded, 6 ORs killed, 70 wounded and 1 missing. Lieutenant-Col Adams was later awarded the DSO.

22nd Royal Fusiliers had fought its last major action. It withdrew to Hermies, where Third Army was establishing a stronger defence line for the winter having abandoned the dangerous Bourlon salient. On 13 December the battalion moved to defences on the bank of the Canal d Nord, beating off an enemy bombing attack two days later. It then went back into support and later into reserve. After a further tour in the Canal du Nord positions 26–30 December, 22nd RF spent most of January 1918 in a hutted camp at Barastre. On 24 January 1918 the battalion's former CO, Brig-Gen Barker, returned to take command of 99th Bde.

== Disbandment ==
'The 22nd Battalion never lost a yard of trench or failed their comrades in the day of battle'

Brig-Gen R. Barnett Barker on the disbandment of the battalion.

By early 1918 the BEF was suffering a manpower crisis. Brigades were reduced from four to three battalions, and surplus war-formed battalions were broken up to provide reinforcements for others. As the weakest battalion in 2nd Division, and consistently short of reinforcements, 22nd RF was one of those selected for disbandment, which was carried out on 5 February. Fifteen officers and 309 ORs (including most of the original 'K' men) were posted to 23rd RF in 99th Bde, and 14 officers and 274 ORs to 24th RF in 5th Bde. Brigadier-Gen Barker took as many officers and men as he could into 99th Bde HQ, and Lt-Col Phythian-Adams went to command Second Army School. A number of junior officers applied for transfer to the Royal Flying Corps (RFC). Both 23rd and 24th RF were later heavily engaged in defending against the German spring offensive of March 1918, in which Brig-Gen Barker was killed by shellfire on 24 March along with his staff captain, Capt Edward Bell. Their bodies were taken back through the chaos of the 'Great Retreat' by a group of men from his old battalion, who buried them at Albert.

Total casualties for the battalion appear to have been 90 officers and 2230 ORs, of whom 18–20 officers and between 398 and 440 ORs died. Others were killed after their transfer to other units.

== Commanders ==
The following commanded the battalion during its service:

- Lt-Col Archibald Innes, DSO, from raising to August 1915 (transferred to 27th RF)
- Lt-Col Randle Barnett Barker, DSO*, August 1915 to 18 November 1917 (promoted)
- Lt-Col W.J. Phythian-Adams, DSO, 18 November 1917 to disbandment

=== Other notable members ===
- H.H. Munro, the humorous writer 'Saki', enlisted in King Edward's Horse, became a lance-sergeant in 22nd RF; killed at the Quadrilateral 14 November 1916.
- Frederick William Palmer, awarded the VC for his action at Miraunont on 16 February 1917, was later commissioned as a 2nd Lieutenant, and transferred to the RFC when 22nd RF was disbanded.

== Insignia ==
The cap badge of the Royal Fusiliers was a 'grenade' with the Tudor rose surrounded by a garter with the motto 'Honi Soit Qui Mal y Pense' superimposed on the 'bomb' of the grenade.

When it comprised four RF battalions as part of 33rd Division, 99th Bde adopted coloured cloth 'grenade' badges sewn onto the back of the uniform to identify individual battalions: 22nd RF wore this in yellow. 2nd Division did not employ such 'battle flashes'. 2nd Division's formation sign was a black oval with three 8-pointed stars, the centre one red, flanked by two smaller white stars.

== Memorials ==
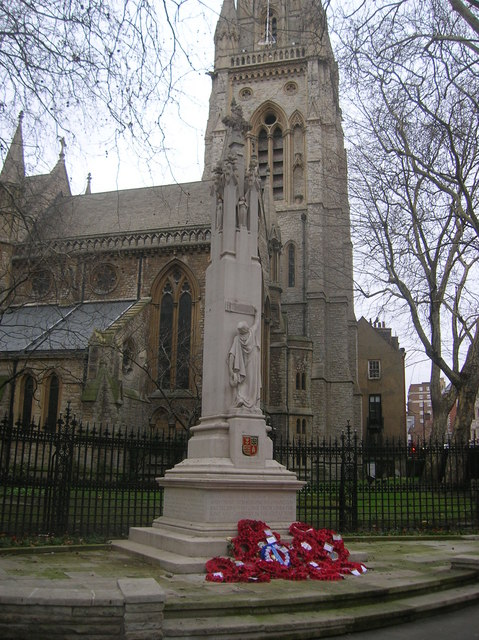
The Kensington Battalions' War Memorial outside St Mary Abbotts, Kensington High Street.

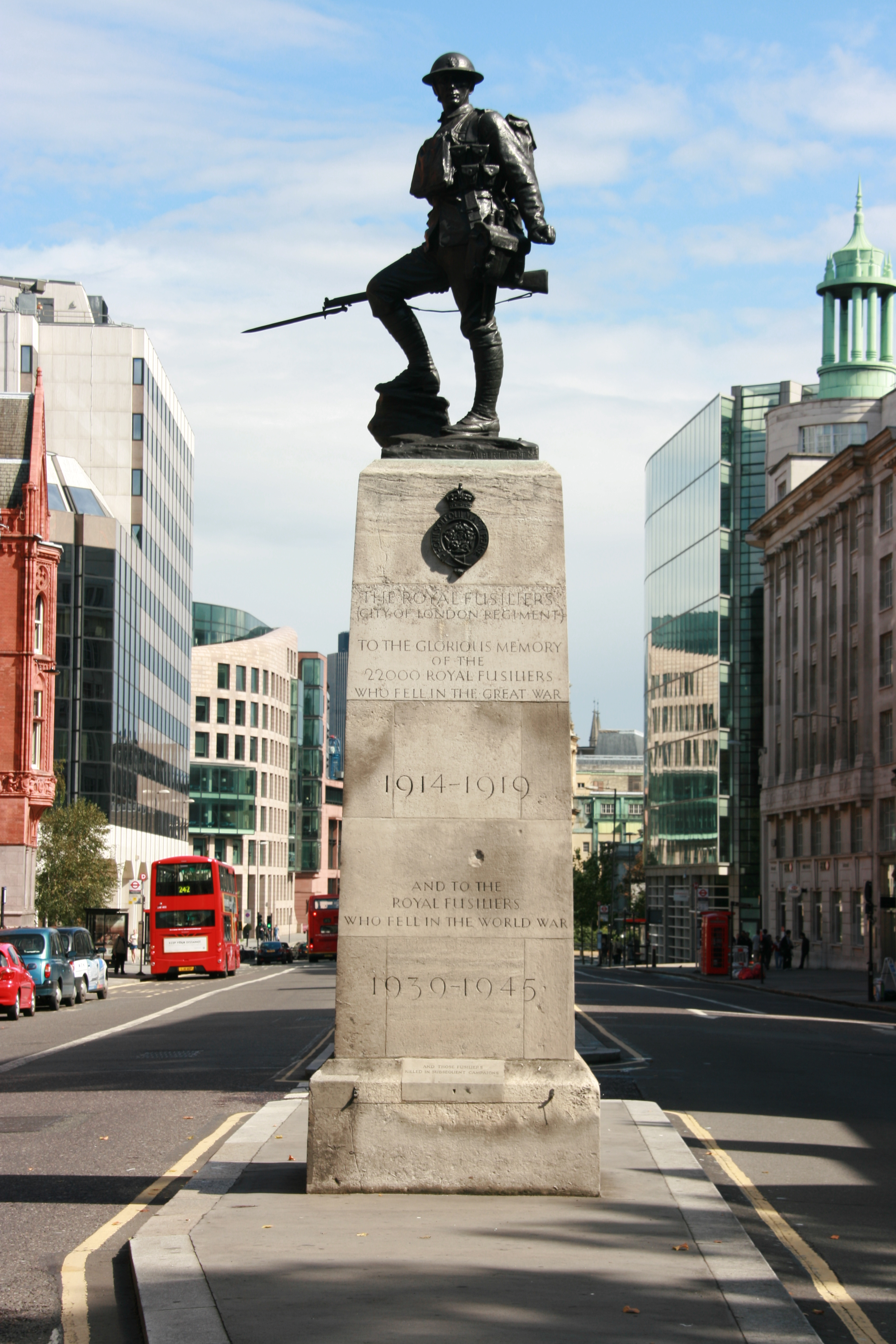
Royal Fusiliers War Memorial on High Holborn.

The 22nd Royal Fusiliers (Kensington) and the 13th London Regiment (Princess Louise's Kensingtons) share a war memorial in front of St Mary Abbots Church in Kensington High Street. It was unveiled on 1 July 1922 in the presence of Princess Louise, Duchess of Argyll and Lt-Gen Sir Francis Lloyd (who originally suggested merging the Kensington and Colonial battalions). One face of the plinth lists the following engagements for the 22nd RF: 'VIMY RIDGE DELVILLE WOOD & GUILLEMONT/ THE SOMME 1916 BEAUMONT HAMEL & SERRE THE ANCRE/ GREVILLERS MIRAUMONT OPPY WOOD CAMBRAI'.

In the Resurrection Chapel within St Mary Abbots is a wooden battlefield cross originally erected at Oppy Wood as a memorial to the 28 men who died there between 29 April and 3 May 1917. It was replaced by a permanent memorial in 1929 and later placed in the church. It was rededicated in 2014.

The 22nd Battalion is listed on the plinth of the Royal Fusiliers War Memorial at Holborn Bar in London, which is dedicated to the almost 22,000 men of the regiment who died in World War I.
