= Randle Barker =

British Army officer

Brigadier-General Randle Barker DSO*
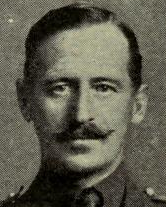
- Born: 19 June 1870; Blackheath, England
- Died: 24 March 1918 (aged 47); Gueudecourt, France
- Burial place: Albert Communal Cemetery Extension
- Military career
- Allegiance: United Kingdom
- Branch: British Army
- Rank: Brigadier-General
- Commands: 99th Brigade; 3rd Brigade; 22nd (Service) Battalion, Royal Fusiliers (Kensington)
- Conflicts: First World War
- Awards: Distinguished Service Order & Bar; Mentioned in Despatches (5)

Brigadier-General Randle Barnett Barker, DSO & Bar (19 June 1870 – 24 March 1918) was a British Army officer who was killed at Gueudecourt, France, while in command of the 99th Brigade. Barker served in the Militia between 1889 and 1906 and was recalled to service during the First World War. Initially assigned to command a prisoner of war camp, he requested a more active post and was appointed to the 22nd (Service) Battalion, Royal Fusiliers (Kensington). Barker led the battalion when it was deployed to the Western Front in 1915 and the following year was appointed to the Distinguished Service Order (DSO) for bravery in the Battle of Delville Wood. He received a bar to his DSO for actions at the 1917 Battle of Arleux and afterwards was promoted to the temporary rank of brigadier general and given command of the 3rd Brigade. Barker was in command of the 99th Brigade at the time of the 1918 German spring offensive, during which he was killed by a shell explosion.

== Family ==
Randle Barnett Barker was born on 19 June 1870, at Blackheath (then in Kent), the son of Major John Barnett Barker, formerly of the Northumberland Fusiliers. (Note: Barnett-Barker is hyphenated in some sources, and his men knew him as 'B.B.' but army lists and the Sedbergh School memorial refer to him as R.B. Barker.) He attended Sedbergh School.

== Early military career ==
Barker was commissioned into the Militia as a second lieutenant in the 3rd (Royal Denbigh and Flint Militia) Battalion, Royal Welsh Fusiliers on 26 January 1889, and was promoted to lieutenant on 29 March 1890. He then obtained a regular commission as a lieutenant in the Royal Welsh Fusiliers on 17 January 1891. On 1 October 1898 he became adjutant of the regiment's 1st Volunteer Battalion based at Wrexham and he was promoted to Captain on 19 July 1899.

He retired from the army on 5 May 1906 but as a Reserve officer he served as brigade major of the Cheshire Brigade of the Volunteers (Territorial Force from 1908) for five years from 1 June 1906.

== First World War ==
On the outbreak of the First World War in the summer of 1914, Barker was like many other reserve officers 'dug out' and appointed to a low-key position, in Barker's case as commandant of a prisoner of war camp. However, he asked for a more active appointment, and on 21 September 1914 he was appointed second-in-command of the Kensington Battalion of the Royal Fusiliers with the rank of temporary major. This was one of many 'Pals battalions' being raised from the volunteers responding to Lord Kitchener's famous appeal. The Kensington Battalion, later the 22nd (Service) Battalion, Royal Fusiliers (Kensington), was raised by William Davison, Mayor of the Royal Borough of Kensington and related to Barker by marriage. The commanding officer (CO) was a more senior 'dugout', but in August 1915 when the battalion began its final training on Salisbury Plain, the CO was transferred to stay in England with the reserve battalion and Barker was promoted to temporary lieutenant colonel to take the 22nd Royal Fusiliers on active service. Barnett Barker was known as 'B.B.' to his officers and men.

The 22nd Royal Fusiliers landed in France in November 1915 as part of the 99th Infantry Brigade (2nd Division) under the command of Brigadier General Richard Orlando Kellett. The two men cooperated successfully, and Barker frequently stood in as brigade commander in Kellett's absence. Despite both men being 'dugouts' they enjoyed one of the longest such partnerships in the British Expeditionary Force (BEF).

Barker won the Distinguished Service Order (DSO) for conspicuous bravery at the Battle of Delville Wood on the Somme, the citation for which appeared in The London Gazette in October 1916 and reads as follows:

For conspicuous gallantry during operations. He took over and organised the defences of a wood with great skill, after making a personal reconnaissance of the whole wood under shell and machine gun fire. He has done other fine work, and has displayed great personal bravery.

His action was the subject of a fanciful illustration in the Daily Sketch.

During the Battle of the Ancre he led his battalion and a collection of other detachments ('Barker's Mixed Force') to clear the notorious German strongpoint known as the Quadrilateral. At the Battle of Arleux during the Arras Offensive, 22nd Royal Fusiliers was engaged in bloody fighting at Oppy Wood, after which Barker lamented that only 40 of his men had come out of the action with him. Barker received a bar to his DSO for Oppy Wood and was promoted to brevet major from 3 June. His bar's citations States the following:

For conspicuous gallantry and devotion to duty. During an assault his battalion was compelled to withdraw from its objective owing to heavy casualties and to its flank being unsupported. At this most critical moment he reorganised and rallied all the men of his brigade who were within reach, and by his promptitude and fine leadership won back most of the objective, and maintained it until relieved.

He was also mentioned in despatches five times during the war.

On 18 November 1917 Barker was promoted to temporary brigadier general to take command of 3rd Brigade in 1st Division, but when Kellett was obliged to give up command of 99th Brigade Barker was transferred on 24 January 1918 to take over from him. One of his first tasks was to disband the 22nd Royal Fusiliers, which after its casualties was the weakest battalion in 2nd Division and was broken up to reinforce other battalions. Barker found posts on the brigade staff for a number of men from the Kensingtons.

When the German spring offensive was launched on 21 March, the 2nd Division was in reserve in the vulnerable Flesquières Salient, which came under heavy attack. Next day the 99th Brigade was detached to support the 47th (1/2nd London) Division in the front line. It was virtually overwhelmed in the fighting next day, and Barker and his brigade major were unable to reach the battalions as he struggled to maintain a link between V and VII Corps as they were pushed back. By 24 March the 'Great Retreat' was under way. Barker and his staff were at a roadside in Gueudecourt writing orders for the retirement when a single shell fell, killing Barker and his Staff Captain, Edward Bell. A party of former 22nd Royal Fusiliers, led by Sanitary-Sergeant T.E. McGowan, carried the bodies on stretchers back through the retreat until they were able to commandeer a returning ammunition lorry. Next day they dug two graves at Albert and held a service over them.

== Memorials ==
The Commonwealth War Graves Commission headstones to Brigadier General Randle Barnett Barker and Captain Edward Inkerman Jordan Bell in Albert Communal Cemetery Extension state that they are 'believed to be buried in this cemetery'. Barker left a widow, Elinor Gertrude Barnett-Barker, nee Hobson, of Pant-y-Goitre, Abergavenny, and two sons, John Philip C. Sanky Barker, and Terence Clare Randle Calverhall Barker. They donated the east chancel window of St Mary's Priory Church in Abergavenny in his memory. His name is listed in the Sedbergh School Memorial Cloisters.
