= Clunas =

Clunas is a surname. Notable people with the surname include:

- Charles Clunas (1894–1916), Scottish footballer
- Craig Clunas (born 1954), Scottish art historian
- Gordon Clunas, Australian rugby player
- William Clunas (1899–1967), Scottish footballer
