= Public Schools Battalions =

Former British army battalions of WW1

The Public Schools Battalions were a group of Pals battalions of the British Army during World War I. They were raised in 1914 as part of Kitchener's Army and were originally recruited exclusively from former public schoolboys. When the battalions were taken over by the British Army they became variously the 16th (Service) Battalion (Public Schools) of the Middlesex Regiment and the 18th–21st (Service) Battalions (1st–4th Public Schools) of the Royal Fusiliers. However, Kitchener's Army was faced with a dire shortage of officers and so 'young gentlemen'— public schoolboys and university graduates, including many of those who had enlisted in the Public Schools Battalions — were encouraged to apply for commissions. The battalions' depleted ranks were made up with ordinary volunteers (and later conscripts) and although they retained the Public Schools titles, their exclusive nature was doomed. Two battalions remained to serve on the Western Front: the original battalion was all but destroyed on the first day of the Somme. After hard service both battalions were disbanded in February 1918 before the end of the war.

== Recruitment ==
Alfred Leete's recruitment poster for Kitchener's Army.

On 6 August 1914, less than 48 hours after Britain's declaration of war, Parliament sanctioned an increase of 500,000 men for the Regular British Army, and the newly appointed Secretary of State for War, Earl Kitchener of Khartoum issued his famous call to arms: 'Your King and Country Need You', urging the first 100,000 volunteers to come forward. This group of six divisions with supporting arms became known as Kitchener's First New Army, or 'K1'. The flood of volunteers overwhelmed the ability of the army to absorb and organise them, and many of the units were organised under the auspices of local organisations up and down the country. The concept of a 'battalion of pals' serving together originated with the 'Stockbrokers' Battalion' of the Royal Fusiliers raised in the City of London and was taken up enthusiastically as the 'Pals battalions'. These local and pals battalions formed Kitchener's Fifth New Army, or 'K5', authorised on 10 December 1914.

One of the most prominent of these units was raised by Major (and self-promoted) Lieutenant-Colonel J.J. Mackay and a committee of businessmen meeting at Harrow-on-the-Hill in Middlesex. They decided to raise a battalion exclusively from former public schoolboys and university men. They established a recruiting office at 24 St James's Street, London SW, and began recruiting on 4 September 1914. Membership was by application only; over 1,500 applications were received including from retired officers who wished to serve in the ranks. Such was the spirit of adventure that many men wished to serve as private soldiers alongside their comrades, rather than as officers. Amongst the recruits were enough former international players for the battalion to field two rugby union and one football team. This became the 16th (Service) Battalion of the Middlesex Regiment (Duke of Cambridge's Own), but was often referred to by its members as the 'PSB'. (Note: The 16th Middlesex formed a Pipe band and adopted an Irish Wolfhound as its mascot, considered eccentricities for a battalion that was theoretically recruited in London.)

The volunteers were summoned to Waterloo Station on 15 September and boarded a special train for Kempton Park Racecourse where they were to go into camp and begin their training. Such was the success of the original recruitment drive that four further Public Schools battalions were raised by the Public Schools and University Men's Force of 66 Victoria Street, London, beginning on 11 September. These gathered at Epsom Downs Racecourse and were the battalions that joined the Royal Fusiliers (City of London Regiment).

== 16th (Service) Battalion, Middlesex Regiment (Public Schools) ==
16th (Service) Battalion, Middlesex Regiment (Public Schools)
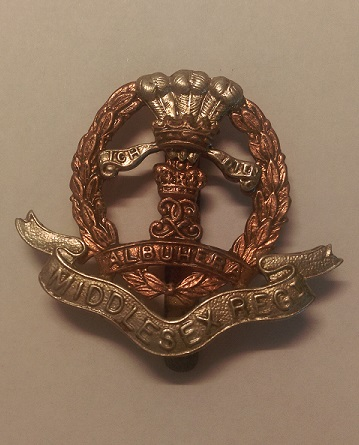
- Cap badge of the Middlesex Regiment
- Active: 4 September 1914 – 11 February 1918
- Country: United Kingdom
- Branch: New Army
- Type: Infantry
- Size: 1 Battalion + Reserve Battalion
- Part of: 33rd Division; 29th Division
- Garrison/HQ: Kempton Park Racecourse
- Engagements: Beaumont-Hamel; Arras; Third Ypres; Cambrai

=== Training ===
The battalion was initially issued with blue uniforms and old Long Lee-Enfield rifles due to the shortages of khaki and modern Short Magazine Lee-Enfields (SMLE Mk III). However, a number of the recruits were already familiar with the older rifle from service in their school Cadet Corps. A Regular officer, Lt-Col J. Hamilton Hall, took over command. In January 1915 the battalion was marched to a hutted camp at Woldingham, Surrey, with kit being moved by private cars and hired removal vans. By the end of 1914 the battalion had provided 360 candidates for officer training, many of them replaced by volunteers arriving from different parts of the British Empire. Unfit men were weeded out and posted to the reserve companies, E and F under Maj Mackay (later 24th (Reserve) Battalion see below).

On 10 December 1914 the 16th Middlesex was assigned to 119th Brigade in 40th Division, but the War Office (WO) then decided to convert the K4 battalions into reserve battalions to train reinforcements for the earlier K1–K3 units. So on 27 April 1915 the K5 divisions were renumbered to take up the designations of the K4 formations. The short-lived 40th Division thus became 33rd Division, and 16th Middlesex was in 100th Brigade.

On 1 July 1915 the battalions were formally taken over by the WO and on 9 July the 16th Middlesex moved to Clipstone Camp in Nottinghamshire where all the infantry of the division were concentrated by 13 July. On 3 August they went to Salisbury Plain for final battle training, with 100th Bde at Perham Down.

33rd Division landed in France to join the British Expeditionary Force (BEF) in November 1915. Advanced parties of the 16th Middlesex arrived at Le Havre on 14 November and the main body of the battalion left Perham Down on 17 November. In December 33 Division took over the trenches on the La Bassée front from Givenchy to 'Mad Point', just north of the Hohenzollern Redoubt, scene of bitter fighting the previous autumn, but now considered a 'quiet' sector suitable for newly arrived formations to learn the routines of trench warfare. 16th Middlesex was introduced to the trenches by 1st Middlesex of 19th Bde, a Regular Army brigade that had been transferred into 33rd Division to exchange experience

In its first tour of duty at the Annequin North trenches on 2–14 January the battalion suffered its first casualties, losing one officer and 11 other ranks (ORs) killed, with 24 ORs wounded by a single shell. The next tour (27 January–2 February) was responsible for more serious casualties: first the frontline and support trenches were heavily bombarded on 28 January, then the battalion was ordered to carry out a trench raid on 'Mad Point'. Although the raid was cancelled, the patrol sent out that night to reconnoitre suffered casualties. Then when the battalion was in brigade reserve on the night of 3/4 February, it was ordered to make a bombing attack on three craters at Mine Point. D Company (140 men plus 32 battalion bombers) went out but the attack was a failure; a second attempt next night also failed, with mounting casualties. On 16 February the Germans exploded a large mine; a party of 16th Middlesex held the lip of the crater until relieved by 21st Royal Fusiliers (4th Public Schools).

29th Division's formation sign.

On 25 February the public schools battalions were withdrawn from 33rd Division and assigned to GHQ Troops at Saint-Omer while their best men were selected for officers' commissions; 16th Middlesex supplied 250 candidates. The rest of the battalion was then quarantined at Saint Omer due to an outbreak of German Measles, and it was not until 24 April that it entrained for Doullens, made up to strength with raw recruits. At Doullens it joined 86th Bde in 29th Division, replacing an Irish battalion of the Regular Army that could not get enough reinforcements from Ireland.

=== Somme ===
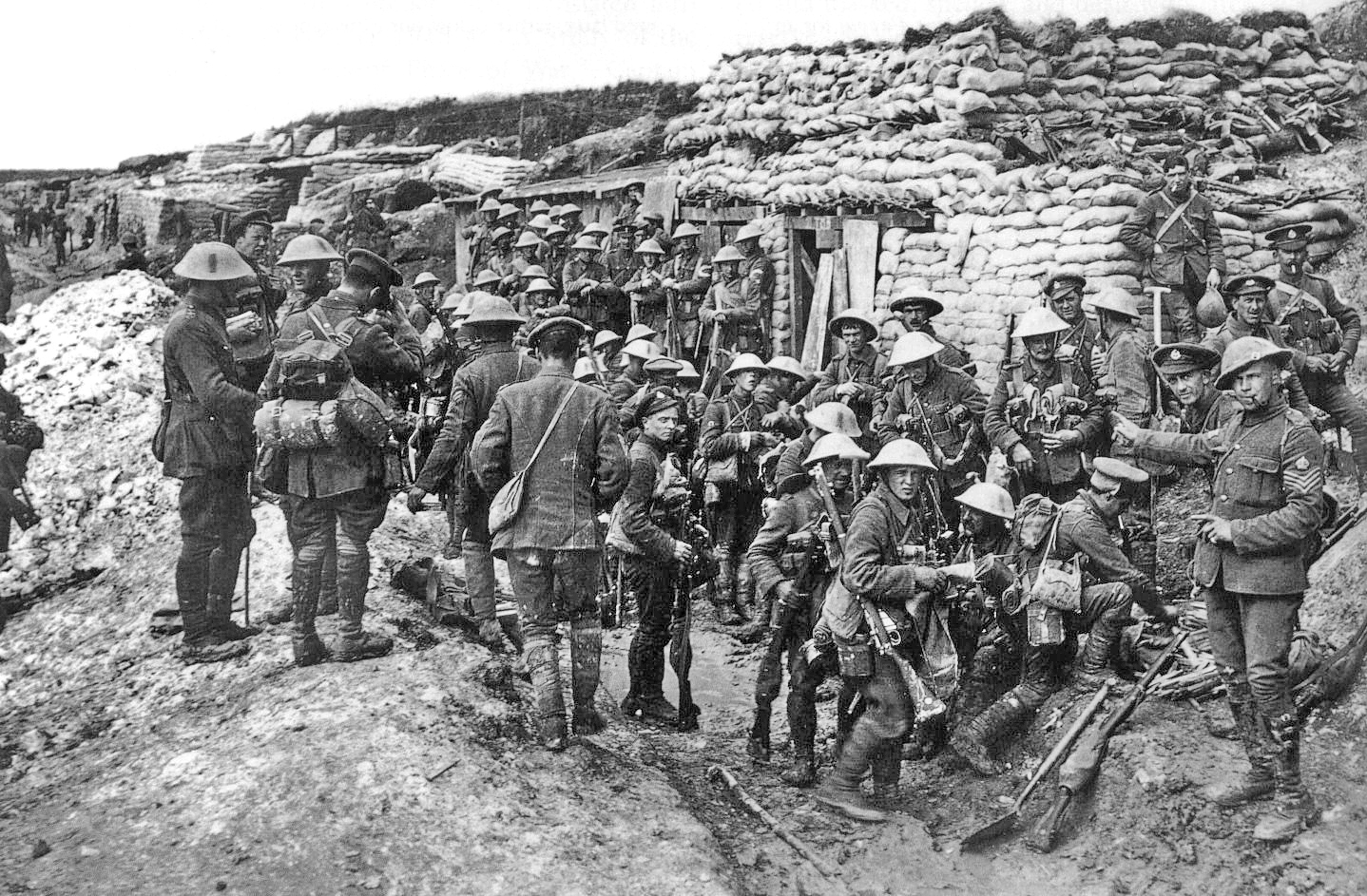
A company of the Public Schools Battalion at "White City" prior to the Battle of the Somme. Photo by Ernest Brooks.

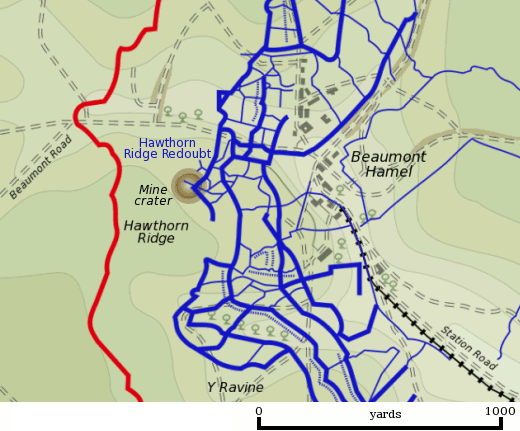
Map of the Hawthorn Ridge sector: British jumping-off trench in red, German defences in blue.

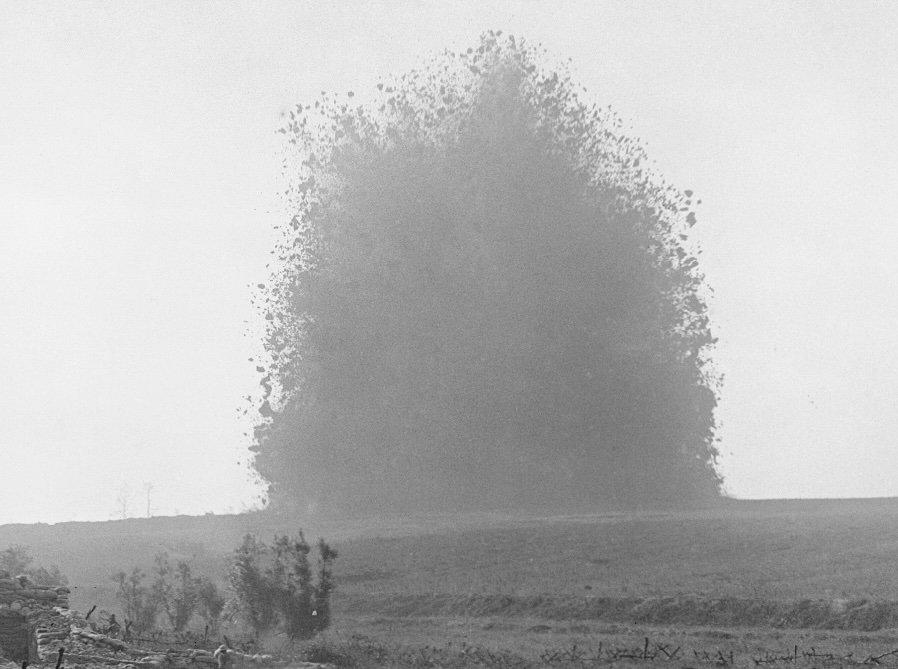
The moment the Hawthorn Ridge mine exploded.

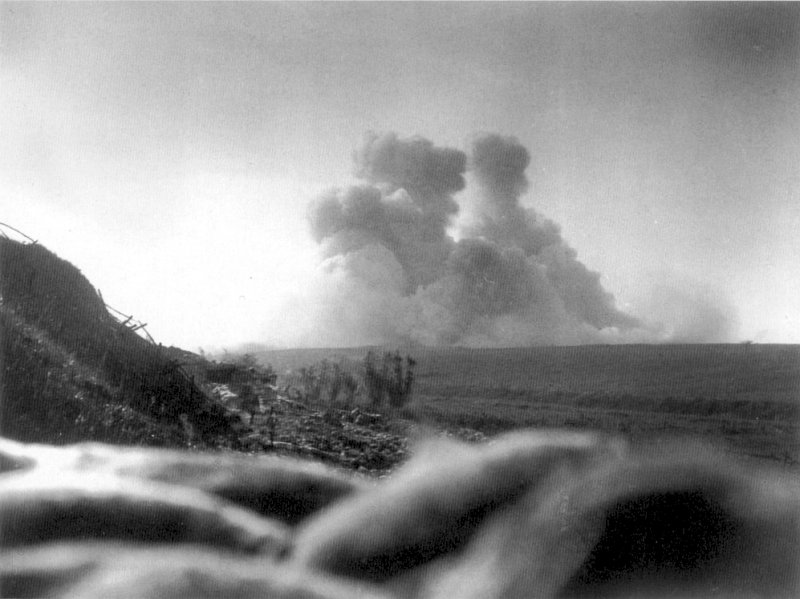
Hawthorn Ridge: in the foreground men in helmets wait for the debris to fall before attacking at Zero hour.

29th Division had recently taken over a section of the line in front of Beaumont-Hamel and was preparing for the 'Big Push' (the Battle of the Somme) scheduled for 29 June 1916. The division's objective was to cross 350 yards (320 m) of open ground and penetrate the German front line to Beaumont-Hamel, taking the Hawthorn Ridge Redoubt with the assistance of a large mine. The 16th Middlesex, like other battalions, had to provide working parties to carry away the chalk excavated by the tunnellers. The plan hinged on a five-day artillery bombardment to destroy the enemy trenches and barbed wire. Bad weather obscured the targets, patrols (including one from 16th Middlesex) reported much of the wire still uncut, and the bombardment was extended for two extra days, with Z day put back to 1 July. The 16th Middlesex was in support, behind the 2nd Royal Fusiliers attacking towards the Hawthorn Ridge Redoubt and the 1st Lancashire Fusiliers advancing from a sunken lane in No man's land towards The Copse a few hundred yards further north. Controversially, the Hawthorn Ridge mine was blown at 07.20, 10 minutes before Zero hour, which allowed the Germans time to recover before the infantry went 'over the top'. The explosion was caught by cameraman Geoffrey Malins and later shown worldwide in his film The Battle of the Somme.

Before dawn on 1 July 16 Middlesex under Lt-Col Hall moved up to assembly trenches named Cripps Cut and Cardiff Street, where they waited while the first wave went forward into No man's land five minutes before Zero. Both the Royal Fusiliers and Lancashire Fusiliers were caught by a cross-fire of machine guns from the 'Bergwerk' to the right of Hawthorn Ridge and from the Copse, and by the artillery barrage that the Germans laid down on the British start line. The barrage was so intense and the number of returning wounded so great that the second wave, including B and D Companies of the 16th Middlesex, could not leave their trenches until 07.55. A and C Companies followed, but all were caught by the same fire. The 16th Middlesex just about reached the wire in front of the crater, with heavy loss, but could get no further. Malins' film shows a distant group of men, believed to be from the 16th Middlesex, reaching the crater, then retreating in smaller numbers. 16th Middlesex's adjutant, Captain F.S. Cochram, went forward to reorganise the men of B and D Companies in front of the crater, but was wounded. Following up at 09.15, the Newfoundland Regiment in 88th Bde were cut down, and 29th Division's attack was halted, having achieved nothing. Lt-Col Hall worked to reorganise the survivors and bring up the battalion reserve to hold the front trench. Many of the men remained pinned down among the wounded in front of the wire and were taken prisoner later in the day.

The battalion was taken out of the line on 3 July, moving back into billets. Figures vary, but the consensus is that on the First day of the Somme the 16th Middlesex lost 22 officers and about 500 ORs in the attack, among the heaviest casualty lists of the day; only one frontline officer remained of the four companies that had attacked. Many of the men of the 16th Middlesex are buried in the Commonwealth War Graves Commission's Hawthorn Ridge Cemetery No 1, close to the mine crater (41 named graves), others are in Auchonvillers Cemetery behind the start line (21 named), and 91 names appear on the Thiepval Memorial to the missing. (Note: Lt-Col Hall was awarded a Distinguished Service Order (DSO).)

29th Division was relieved from duty on 24/25 July and was sent to camp in the Ypres Salient where the battalions were rebuilt and began doing trench duty once more. In October 29 Division returned to the Somme where it did trench duty in the Transloy area while the Somme Offensive continued, but 86th Bde made no further attacks until 28 February 1917, when it assaulted Palz and Potsdam Trenches near Sailly-Saillisel. The objective was to gain observation over the valleys to the north, and to discover whether the Germans were planning a withdrawal. The Regular battalions of the brigade attacked behind a Creeping barrage that moved slowly because of the mud the men had to cross. After a partial success the brigade consolidated the captured trenches.

=== Arras ===
In April 29 Division moved north to join in the Arras Offensive, entering the line on 14 April too late to take much part in the First Battle of the Scarpe. It then attacked at the Second Battle of the Scarpe on 23 April with 86th Bde in support for the second phase. A German counter-attack disrupted preparations for the second attack in the afternoon, and although 86th Bde took its objective it was pushed back from part of it to hold 'Shrapnel Trench', where the Lewis guns of B Company held off the last counter-attack until relieved that night. The division went back into the line on 14 May for the final stages of the Arras Offensive. On 30 May 86th Bde attacked to take a trench in front of 'Infantry Hill'. It planned a surprise night attack without preliminary artillery fire, but the attack was postponed and secrecy was compromised. When the attack went in the following night, the Germans saw the attackers leaving their trenches in the moonlight and brought down defensive artillery fire. Most of the attack broke down, but a party of 16th Middlesex succeeded in getting into the enemy trench. However, they could not be reinforced and were forced to surrender next morning.

=== Ypres ===
In July the division was transferred north to take part in the Third Ypres Offensive, and the battalion went into the line on 9/10 August. The following night three platoons of A Company and three from the 1st Lancashire Fusiliers advanced under a 'pocket barrage' to push outposts across the troublesome Steenbeck stream (which had halted earlier attacks) and take Passerelle Farm. This was successful, but had to be repeated the following night to secure the farm. The battalion was relieved on the night of 12/13 August, having lost two officers and 30 ORs killed and three officers and 83 ORs wounded during this short tour of duty.

86th Brigade was in support for the division's attack at the Battle of Langemarck on 16 August, and 16th Middlesex was not called upon. However, that night the battalion moved forward to take over the line and the commanding officer, Lt-Col Frank Morris of the Border Regiment, was killed, only two days after taking command (Lt-Col Hamilton Hall having been promoted earlier). Major J. Forbes-Robertson arrived next day to replace him.

The battalion was present in the line and suffered casualties but did not attack at the Battles of Polygon Wood (26 September) and Broodseinde (4 October). At the Battle of Poelcappelle on 9 October, the battalion was detailed to be a counter-attack battalion for 86th Bde, which reached its objectives by 08.00 without much difficulty. The unused 16th Middlesex then took over the line that night.

=== Cambrai ===
On 16 October 29th Division was moved south by rail to train for the great tank attack on the Hindenburg Line (the Battle of Cambrai). The plan was for the division to pass through the attacking divisions of III Corps, advance with the reserve tanks to take the first day's objectives, and then continue the advance next day. Tank–infantry training began at Wailly in early November, and the division began moving into position during the night of 18/19 November.

The attack was launched at 06.20 on 20 November accompanied by a massive artillery fireplan. By 11.30 III Corps had captured nearly all of the enemy's outpost line and battle zone. 29th Division was given permission to advance at 10.15. Four Mark IV tanks of No 9 Section, 3 Company, A Battalion, Tank Corps, had crossed the British start line an hour after Zero and waited under cover for the infantry of 86th Bde to come up. The lead tank then used its Fascine to cross the wide Hindenburg Line front trench and the section followed it over. They silenced machine guns and snipers in Couilet Wood and Marcoing before moving on to Nine Wood, their final objective for the day. 16th Middlesex, leading 86th Bde, followed the tanks to find H Battalion of the Tank Corps already holding the wood. There were still German infantry among the trees, but the battalion suppressed these with the help of No 9 Section. At 13.15 the commander of H Battalion received a receipt for the wood from the infantry, and withdrew to his rallying point. About 16.00 a platoon of 16th Middlesex with one tank captured a bridge across the St Quentin Canal and linked up at Noyelles-sur-Escaut (already entered by the cavalry) with 2nd Royal Fusiliers which had fought its way past Marcoing.

Next day the brigade was unable to advance as planned because the Germans put in a determined counter-attack at 10.30 to recover Noyelles, and for several hours the 16th Middlesex, 2nd Royal Fusiliers and the 18th Hussars were hard pressed, parts of the village changing hands several times in bitter street fighting. With the help of two tanks they succeeded in driving the Germans out entirely by 16.00 and were then relieved in order to go into billets in Marcoing.

After the initial stunning success, the Battle of Cambrai died down in stalemate. 29th Division was set to work turning Marcoing and Masnières into strongpoints. It reported that 29 November was an exceptionally quiet day, but the Germans launched a massive counter-stroke before dawn next day. 16th Middlesex was holding posts at Mon Plaisir Farm and the nearby canal lock bridge; at 07.00 86th Bde called down artillery fire on the approaches to the farm where movement had been detected. Then shortly before 09.00 a frontal attack came in, preceded by low-flying aircraft Strafing the positions, as well as artillery and machine gun fire. Although the British guns supported as best they could, the Germans had broken through the neighbouring brigade and were streaming towards Marcoing and the battery positions in large numbers. The battalion caused halted these attackers with rifle and Lewis gun fire in enfilade at 400–500 yards' range while an improvised flank guard at the canal lock held the Germans and saved the brigade (Captain Robert Gee of the brigade staff won a Victoria Cross for this action). The CO, Lt-Col Forbes-Robertson, sent the adjutant with a party to the brigade ammunition dump on the other side of the canal; they drove off the Germans who were there and saved some of the ammunition. The Germans did not renew their attacks in the afternoon, but 16th Middlesex remained under heavy artillery and machine gun fire; as the Official History relates: '[t]his Battalion bore its ordeal with amazing fortitude, heartened by its commanding officer, Lieut.-Colonel J. Forbes-Robertson, who visited all positions in turn even when, blinded by a wound, he had to be led by hand'.

86th Brigade bore the main brunt of the German attacks the next day (1 December). 16th Middlesex drove off strong patrols in the morning, but a furious bombardment began at 14.30. Having been forced into an untenable salient along the canal by the previous day's fighting, the brigade had to be either reinforced or withdrawn, but it was not until 19.00 that word got through to pull out. All the wounded were evacuated and every man was loaded up with ammunition, the rest being dumped into the canal. The withdrawal was completed by 04.00 on 2 December, and the brigade was sent for well-earned rest in Ribécourt-la-Tour while the Germans continued to shell their empty positions at Masnières. The shelling extended to Ribécourt, so the brigade went back further to Trescault to get some peace.

During December 16 Middlesex marched by stages through blizzards to Renty, SW of Saint-Omer, arriving on 18 December, moving to Setques in early January, where they carried out training. The battalion went back into the line on 18 January 1918, holding a series of shellholes near Passchendaele.

=== Disbandment ===
By early 1918 the BEF was suffering a severe manpower shortage: roughly one in four infantry battalions had to be disbanded and their surviving personnel drafted to reinforce other units. After its last tour of trench duty from 23 to 26 January the battalion was sent to work on defences at Gravenstafel, where orders arrived to disband the battalion. 16th Middlesex sent drafts to the 2nd, 18th (1st Public Works Pioneers) and 20th (Shoreditch) Battalions of the Middlesex Regiment (in 8th, 33rd and 14th (Light) divisions respectively). Then on 11 February battalion headquarters and the last details (three officers and 58 ORs) went to VIII Corps' reinforcement camp and the battalion was formally disbanded.

=== Insignia ===
As well as the Middlesex Regiment cap badge and brass title 'MIDDLESEX' on the shoulder straps, all ranks wore a yellow cloth bar across the base of the shoulder strap and a yellow vertical rectangle on the side of the steel helmet cover. In June 1917 a soldier of the battalion reported that they were wearing a blue band on the arm as well. The red isosceles triangle of 29th Division was won on both sleeves just below the shoulder strap.

=== See also ===
- Hawthorn Ridge mine detonation On YouTube

== 24th (Reserve) Battalion, Middlesex Regiment ==
When the four service companies of the 16th Middlesex went to Clipstone Camp they left the two depot companies (E and F) at Woldingham under the command of Lt-Col MacKay. They later moved to Tring in Hertfordshire and formed into 24th (Reserve) Battalion on 25 September 1915 to supply reinforcement drafts to the parent battalion. It joined 23rd Reserve Brigade at Northampton, moving to Aldershot by May 1916. On 1 September the local reserve battalions were transferred to the Training Reserve (TR) and it became 100th Training Reserve Battalion in 23rd Reserve Bde. It was redesignated as 256th (Infantry) Battalion, TR on 6 September 1917, then transferred to the Royal Sussex Regiment on 27 October 1917 as 52nd (Graduated) Battalion, engaged in progressive training of 18–19-year-olds. Finally, on 8 February 1919, after the Armistice, it became a Service battalion of the Royal Sussex. It was disbanded on 27 March 1920.

== 18th–21st (Service) Battalions, Royal Fusiliers (1st–4th Public Schools) ==
18th–21st (Service) Battalions, Royal Fusiliers (1st–4th Public Schools)
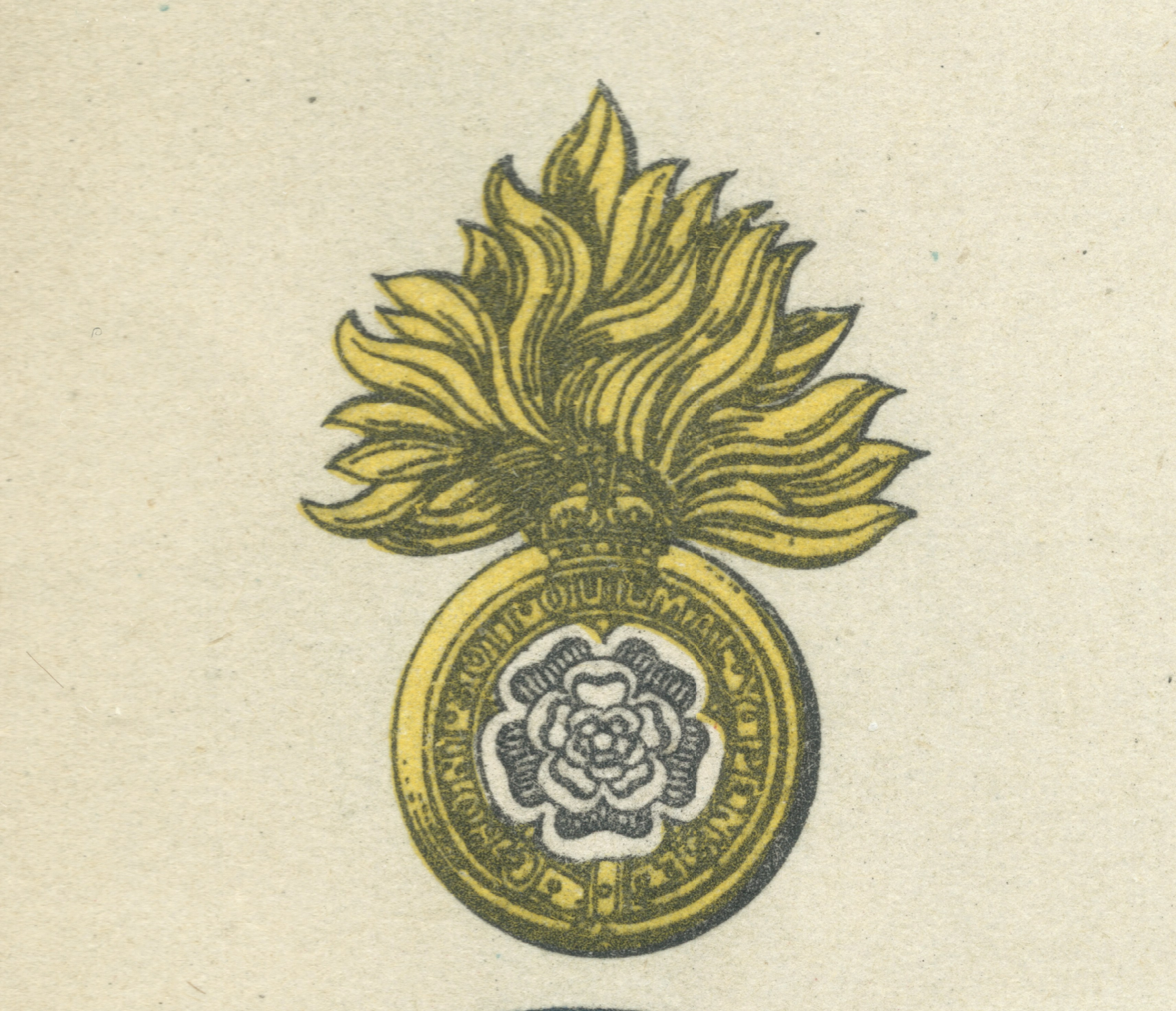
- Cap badge of the Royal Fusiliers
- Active: 11 September 1914 – 16 February 1918
- Country: United Kingdom
- Branch: New Army
- Type: Infantry
- Size: 4 Battalions + 2 Reserve Battalions
- Part of: 33rd Division
- Garrison/HQ: Epsom
- Engagements: High Wood; Arras; Polygon Wood

The four Public Schools Battalions of the Royal Fusiliers formed at Epsom Downs Racecourse on 11 September 1914:

- 18th (Service) Battalion, Royal Fusiliers (1st Public Schools)
- 19th (Service) Battalion, Royal Fusiliers (2nd Public Schools)
- 20th (Service) Battalion, Royal Fusiliers (3rd Public Schools)
- 21st (Service) Battalion, Royal Fusiliers (4th Public Schools)

Their training experience was similar to the 16th Middlesex and other Kitchener battalions. Like all Kitchener units, there was an initial shortage of experienced officers and NCOs to train the battalions. The commanding officer appointed to the 18th Bn was Lord Henry Scott, former commanding officer of the 3rd (Reserve) Battalion, Royal Scots, in the Special Reserve. The 20th and 21st Battalions were camped at Ashtead and at Leatherhead in Surrey during the winter of October 1914–March 1915 while the others stayed at Epsom.

From 10 December the four battalions constituted 118th Brigade in 39th Division of K5, but when the K5 divisions were reorganised on 27 April 1915 the brigade was transferred to 33rd (formerly 40th) Division and was renumbered 98th Brigade. By 26 June 1915 the brigade had concentrated at Clipstone Camp in Nottinghamshire and on 1 July the battalions were formally taken over by the WO. All the infantry of the division were concentrated at Clipstone by 13 July and on 3 August they moved to Salisbury Plain for final battle training, with 98th Bde at Tidworth Camp.

=== Western Front ===
33rd Division's formation sign.

98th Brigade landed in France to join the British Expeditionary Force (BEF) in November 1915, but 18th and 20th Bns were immediately detached on 27 November to join 19th Bde, which had been transferred into 33rd Division to exchange experience (see above). After only a short period learning the routines of trench warfare the 18th, 19th and 21st Battalions were all transferred to GHQ Troops on 27 February 1916 and disbanded on 24 April, when the majority of their personnel were commissioned as officers (see above).

The remaining battalion, 20th (3rd Public Schools), continued serving in 19th Bde. Captain Robert Graves of 2nd Bn Royal Welch Fusiliers, also in 19th Bde, was highly critical of the battalion: 'Their training had been continually interrupted by the large withdrawal of men needed to officer other regiments. The only men left, in fact, appeared to be those unfitted to hold commissions; or even to make good private soldiers'. He claimed that the remaining battalion 'proved a constant embarrassment to the brigade'. One night he visited the front line when an apparent German raiding party was detected: after a flare and a few machine gun rounds had been fired over their heads the 'raiders' surrendered and turned out to be a large patrol from the public schools battalion that had been wandering aimlessly in No man's land. (Note: Hurst goes to great lengths to exonerate 16th Middlesex (Public Schools) from Grave's criticism (which he terms a 'libel'), but has missed the fact that it clearly relates to 20th Royal Fusiliers (3rd Public Schools) in 19th Bde.)After conscription was introduced in 1916 the special character (good or bad) of the Pals battalions was diluted as the war went on.

=== Somme ===
In early July 1916, 33rd Division was sent south from First Army to reinforce Fourth Army fighting on the Somme. It began to move south by train on 10 July and was in Corps Reserve during the Battle of Albert (12–13 July) before part of the division was committed to action during the Battle of Bazentin Ridge on 14 July. 19th Brigade then took part in the Attacks on High Wood: at dawn on 20 July the brigade attacked with two battalions, who forced their way into the wood but came under machine gun fire. 20th Royal Fusiliers, following close behind, cleared the southern part of the objective, but the losses in senior officers led to confusion in the brigade. With fresh support, 20th Royal Fusiliers then reached the northern part after hard fighting, but were driven back to the southern half by high explosive and gas shelling before relief could arrive. Casualties suffered in holding the positions in High Wood under shellfire were heavy.

33rd Division was rested until the night of 6/7 August when it returned to the High Wood sector to carry out engineering preparations for the next attack on 'Wood Lane'. When the attacking brigade launched the assault on 18 August the various engineering aids failed and the brigade was so badly hit that 19th Bde was urgently called up to relieve it before next morning. On 28 October, during the Battle of Le Transloy, the division captured 'Dewdrop' and 'Rainy' trenches, but twice failed against 'Boritska' trench before taking it on 5 November. At this period the 20th Royal Fusiliers was commanded by Lieutenant-Colonel W.B. Garnett. Supplies had to be manhandled to the front line across 5,000 yards (4,600 m) of thick mud. The division then took over a section of line from the French and garrisoned this during the winter.

=== Arras ===
33rd Division was engaged in actions against rearguards as the Germans withdrew to the Hindenburg Line in March 1917 in Operation Alberich. It was then put into the line for the Arras Offensive, during which the 19th Bde fought in the First Battle of the Scarpe on 14 April under the command of 21st Division, attempting to push into the Hindenburg Line positions. 20th Royal Fusiliers made a second unsuccessful attempt on the night of 15/16 April. The rest of the division attacked in the Second Battle of the Scarpe on 23–24 April. On 20 May the division made a surprise frontal attack on the battered Hindenburg Line, and made some progress. Casualties were heavy during the operations of April and May, and included the commanding officer of the 20th Royal Fusiliers, Lt-Col L.F. Leader, who was wounded and succeeded by Lt-Col Modera, MC (Lt-Col Garnett, DSO, was now commanding 2nd Royal Welch Fusiliers in the same brigade).

In the summer 33rd Division was transferred to Nieuport on the Flanders coast, where Fourth Army was intended to make an amphibious assault behind the enemy lines and advance up the coast in conjunction with the BEF's Flanders offensive (the Third Battle of Ypres). It arrived on 31 July and spent the next three weeks under shellfire – both high explosive and Mustard gas – and nightly air raids, as well as repelling one serious attack on 19th Bde, but by the end of August it was clear that the BEF was not going to achieve a clean breakthrough, and the units on the coast began to be sent to the Ypres Salient to reinforce the offensive there.

=== Ypres ===
Elements of the division went into the line in the Ypres sector during September, and then whole division moved up from reserve and was committed to the Battle of Polygon Wood on 26 September. But the division had to fight off a spoiling attack by the Germans the day before, so its own planned attack was dislocated and limited to recovering lost ground.

In November 1917 the 33rd Division was moved to the north of Ypres to take over the Passchendaele Salient from the Canadians, and spent the winter months taking turns of duty in this, probably the worst area on the Western Front, a sea of mud with no cover, with appalling trackways to traverse to and from the line, and under persistent shellfire, particularly with mustard gas shells.

=== Disbandment ===
Like the 16th Middlesex, the 20th Royal Fusiliers was disbanded between 2 and 15 February 1918, when 19 officers and 520 ORs were posted to other battalions, and the remainder sent to VIII Corps' Reinforcement Camp.

=== Insignia ===
Before uniforms were issued, the men trained in civilian dress wearing a lapel badge with the intertwined letters 'PUS' (for Public Schools and University Mens Force). Later the four battalions wore the Royal Fusiliers' crowned 'bomb' badge with Tudor rose and garter superimposed. During their short existence, the other ranks of 18th (1st) Bn wore a red rectangle, 19th (2nd) a violet bar), 20th (3rd) a blue rectangle, and 21st (4th) a green rectangle. 20th Royal Fusiliers had given up special badges by July 1917. 33rd Division's badge was a 'Double-3' domino.

== 28th and 29th (Reserve) Battalions, Royal Fusiliers ==
When the four Royal Fusiliers Public Schools battalions went to Clipstone Camp their depot companies had remained at Epsom and in August 1915 these were formed into two reserve battalions:

- 28th (Reserve) Battalion, Royal Fusiliers – from 1st and 2nd Public Schools
- 29th (Reserve) Battalion, Royal Fusiliers – from 3rd and 4th Public Schools

In November 1915 the two reserve battalions moved to Oxford and then in March 1916 to Edinburgh. On 1 September 1916 they became 104th and 105th Training Reserve Bns in 24th Reserve Bde at Edinburgh. 105th TR Battalion was disbanded at Catterick Camp on 14 December 1917, but 104th TR Bn reverted to the Royal Fusiliers on 1 November 1917 as 53rd (Young Soldier) Bn. On 8 February 1919, after the Armistice, it became the 53rd (Service) Bn at Ripon. It was absorbed into the 26th (Service) Bn, Royal Fusiliers (Bankers) on 2 April 1919.
