= Baron Broughshane =

Extinct barony in the Peerage of the United Kingdom

Baron Broughshane, of Kensington in the County of London, was a title in the Peerage of the United Kingdom. It was created on 19 September 1945 for William Davison, who had earlier represented Kensington South in the House of Commons as a Conservative. The title became extinct on the death of his younger son, the third Baron (who had succeeded his elder brother in 1995), on 24 March 2006.

== Barons Broughshane (1945) ==
- William Henry Davison, 1st Baron Broughshane (1872–1953)
- Patrick Owen Alexander Davison, 2nd Baron Broughshane (1903–1995)
- (William) Kensington Davison, 3rd Baron Broughshane (1914–2006)

Coat of arms of Baron Broughshane
Crest Upon a billet fesswise a stag’s head between two wings Or. Escutcheon Gules a stag trippant and in chief a celestial crown and a fleur-de-lys Or. Supporters On either side a stag Or gorged with a chain gules and pendent therefrom a torteau the dexter charged with a portcullis and the sinister with a grenade fired Or. Motto Virtus In Actione Consistit (Strength Consists In Action)
