= Bernafay Wood British Cemetery =

WWI CWGC cemetery in Somme, France

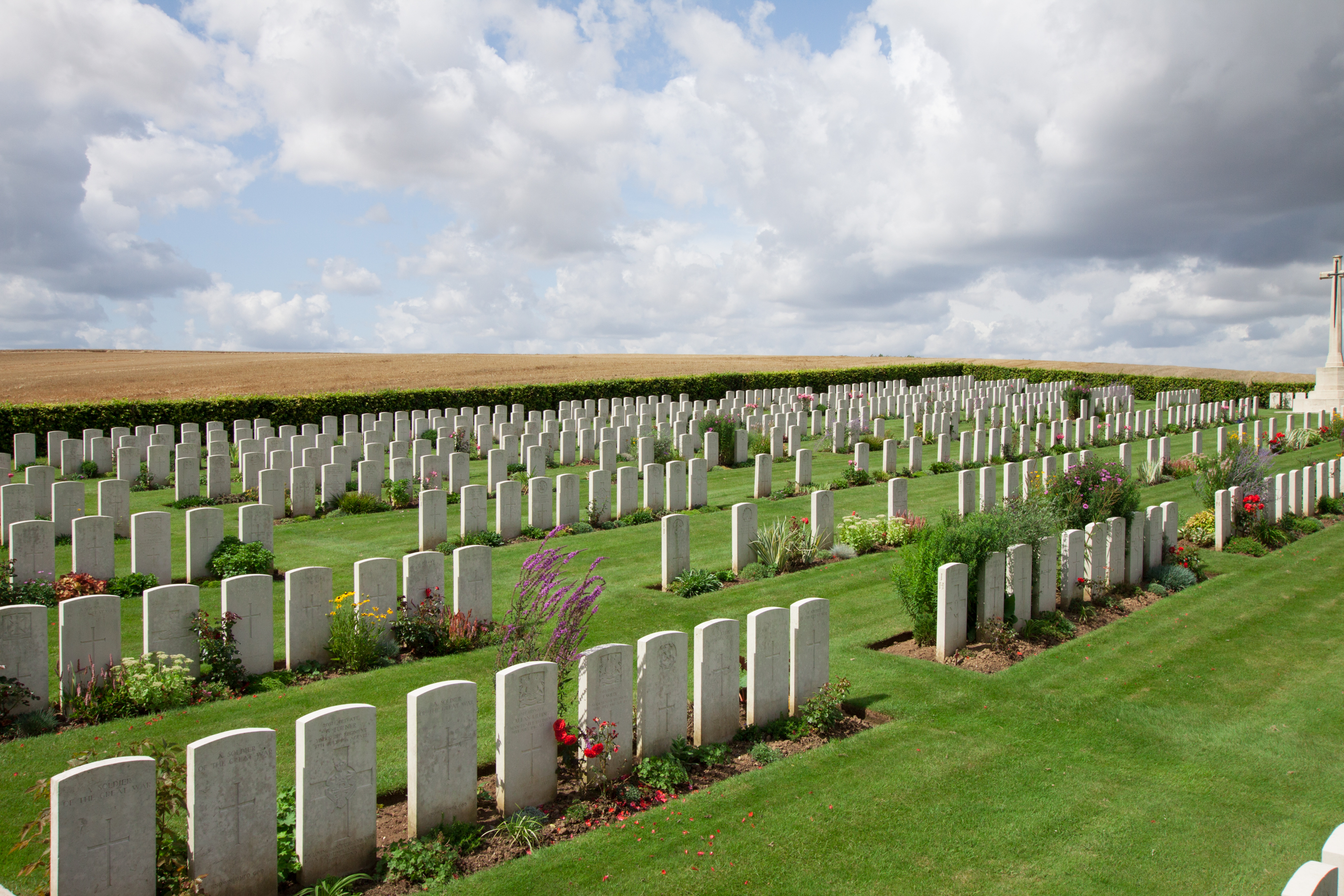
- Interactive map of Bernafay Wood British Cemetery

Details
- Established: August 1916
- Location: Montauban, Somme, France
- Country: British and Commonwealth (CWGC)
- Coordinates: 50.0119°N 2.7930°E
- Type: Military
- No. of graves: 945 total, 529 identified
- Website: Official website
- Find a Grave: Bernafay Wood British Cemetery

The Bernafay Wood British Cemetery is a cemetery located in the Somme region of France commemorating British and Commonwealth soldiers who fought in the Battle of the Somme and against the German 1918 spring offensive in World War I. The cemetery contains mostly those who died between July 1916 and April 1917 and March–August 1918.

== Location ==
The cemetery is located near the village of Montauban-de-Picardie, approximately 10 kilometers east of the town of Albert, France. It is located on the D197 road approximately 2 kilometers south of the village of Longueval.

== Fighting near Bernafay Wood ==
On 1 July 1916, Montauban was captured by the British 30th and 18th Divisions. The heavily fortified Bois de Bernafay (Bernafay Wood) was taken by the 9th Scottish Division on 4 July 1916. Both the village and the wood were lost by the British in the German spring offensive of 1918, with the wood captured by the Germans in March–April 1918. However, the village was retaken by the 7th Buffs and 11th Royal Fusiliers of the 18th Division on 25 August and the wood by the 9th Scottish on the 27th.

== Establishment of the cemetery ==
The cemetery was formally begun by an area dressing station in August 1916, with casualties beginning to be buried on 8 July. It was used as a front line cemetery until April 1917. The modern day cemetery was designed by Sir Herbert Baker and Arthur James Scott Hutton.

=== Statistics ===
At the end of the war, the cemetery contained a total of 284 burials. After the reinterment of casualties from the Bernafay Wood North Cemetery and battlefields to the east of the wood, the cemetery now contains a total of 945 burials, of which 529 are identified and 417 are unidentified. Special memorials are dedicated to 11 British soldiers believed to be buried among the unknown and 12 soldiers whose Bernafay Wood North Cemetery graves were destroyed by shell fire.

Identified Burials by Nationality
Nationality	Number of Burials
United Kingdom	402
Australia	124
New Zealand	2
South Africa	1

Overall Burials by Nationality
Nationality	Number of Burials
United Kingdom	813
Australia	124
South Africa	4
New Zealand	2
Ireland	1
India	1

Number of Burials by Unit
Australian burials	124	Royal Field Artillery	28
King's Liverpool Regiment	27	Royal Garrison Artillery	24
Royal Army Medical Corps	23	Manchester Regiment	20
Middlesex Regiment	20	Royal Berkshire Regiment	17
Royal Engineers	15	Queen's Own – Royal West Kent Regiment	14
Rifle Brigade	14	Durham Light Infantry	12
Duke of Cornwall Light Infantry	9	Wiltshire Regiment	9
East Surrey Regiment	8	Lancashire Fusiliers	8
Royal Horse Artillery	8	Essex Regiment	7
King's Royal Rifle Corps	7	Leicestershire Regiment	6
Royal Welsh Fusiliers	6	Bedfordshire Regiment	5
Irish Guards	5	King's Own Royal Lancaster Regiment	5
Lincolnshire Regiment	5	Loyal North Lancashire Regiment	5
Northamptonshire Regiment	5	Green Howards – Yorkshire Regiment	4
King's Own Yorkshire Light Infantry	4	Machine Gun Corps	4
Northumberland Fusiliers	4	Nottinghamshire & Derbyshire Regiment	4
Oxfordshire & Buckinghamshire Light Infantry	4	Queen's – Royal West Surrey Regiment	4
Scots Guards	4	Somerset Light Infantry	4
Cheshire Regiment	3	Devonshire Regiment	3
Gloucestershire Regiment	3	Grenadier Guards	3
Royal Munster Fusiliers	3	York & Lancaster Regiment	3
Buffs – East Kent Regiment	2	Coldstream Guards	2
Connaught Rangers	2	1st Dragoon Guards (King's)	2
East Yorkshire Regiment	2	King's Own Scottish Borderers	2
Monmouthshire Regiment	2	New Zealand Units	2
Royal Flying Corps/Royal Air Force	2	Royal Fusiliers – City of London Regiment	2
South Lancashire Regiment	2	South Staffordshire Regiment	2
Border Regiment	1	Cameronians – Scottish Rifles	1
Duke of Wellington – West Riding Regiment	1	Hampshire Regiment	1
Highland Light Infantry	1	18th Hussars – Queen Mary's Own	1
Leinster Regiment	1	London Regiment – 3rd Bn. Royal Fusiliers	1
Royal Army Service Corps	1	Royal Scots Fusiliers	1
Royal Scots – Lothian Regiment	1	Royal Sussex Regiment	1
Royal Warwickshire Regiment	1	South African Regiment	1
