= Sportsmen's Battalions =

23rd and 24th (Service) Battalions, Royal Fusiliers
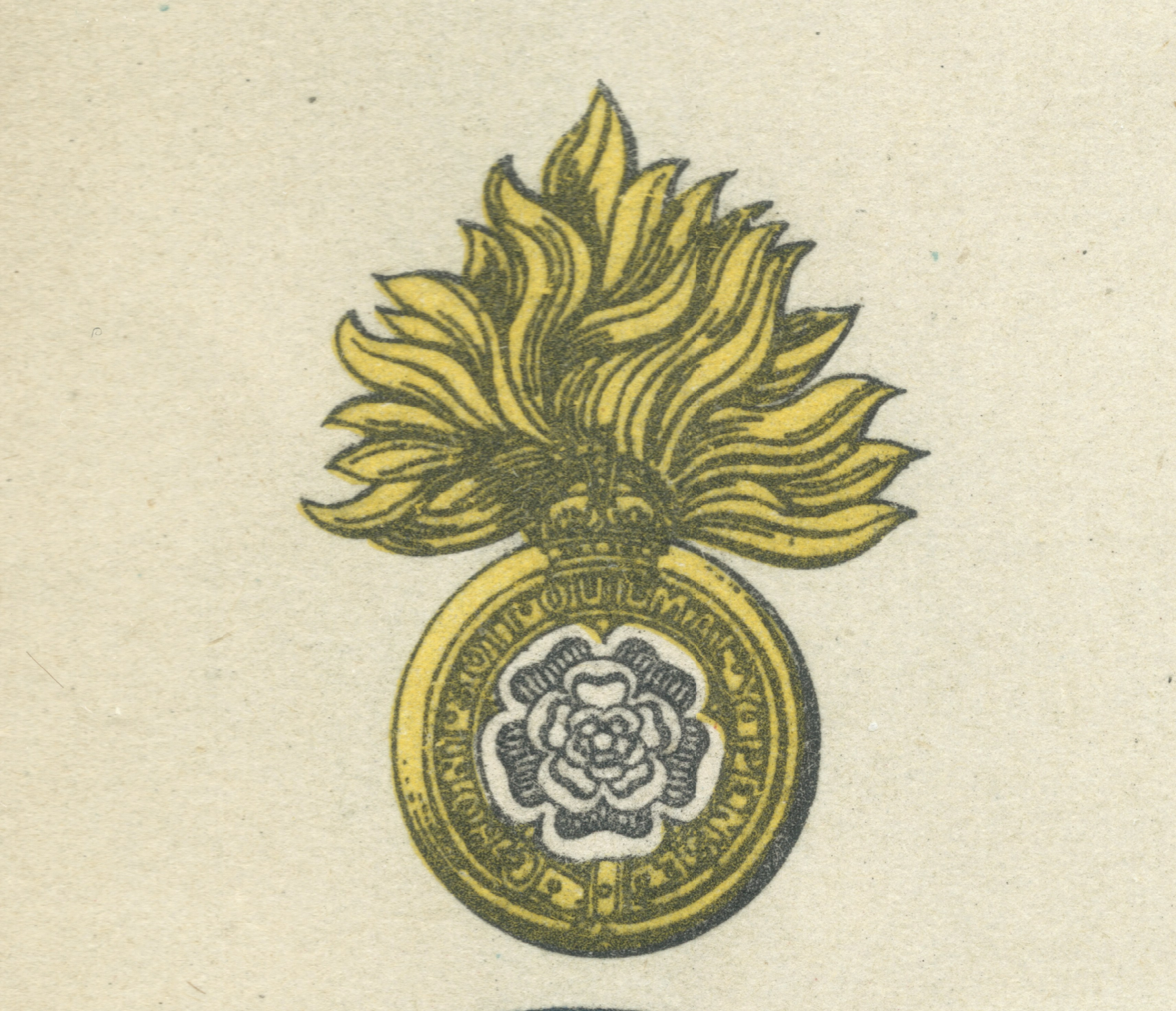
- Cap badge of the Royal Fusiliers
- Active: 25 September 1914–1919
- Allegiance: United Kingdom
- Branch: New Army
- Type: Pals battalion
- Role: Infantry
- Size: Three battalions
- Garrison/HQ: London
- Patron: Mrs E. Cunliffe-Owen

The Sportsman's Battalions, also known as the 23rd (Service) Battalion and 24th (Service) Battalion (2nd Sportsman's), Royal Fusiliers (City of London Regiment) were among the Pals battalions formed by the British Army in the early stages of the First World War (1914–1918). Rather than be taken from a small geographical area, these particular battalions were largely made up of men who had made their name in sports such as cricket, golf, boxing and football or the media. It was intended for upper and middle class men, physically fit, able to shoot and ride, up to the age of 45.

== Recruitment ==
The first battalion, which accepted men up to the age of 45, was formed at the Hotel Cecil in The Strand in early September 1914 by Mrs E. Cunliffe-Owen after she gained permission from Lord Kitchener. From November 1914 until June 1915, training took place at a purpose-built camp at Grey Towers in Hornchurch, Essex. In June 1915 the battalion was attached to 99th Brigade, 33rd Division, and landed at Boulogne in November 1915 and on 25 November transferred with the 99th Brigade to the 2nd Division. The battalion saw action on the Western Front at Vimy Ridge, the Somme and the battle for Delville Wood. It included several first class cricketers, the lightweight boxing champion of England, an ex-mayor of Exeter, and the author John Chesshire. Taking Surrey County Cricket Club as an example, Ernie Hayes, Bill Hitch and Andy Sandham joined the battalion.

2nd Division's formation sign.

The 24th (Service) Battalion (2nd Sportsman's) was raised in London on 20 November 1914 by Mrs Cunliffe-Owen, became attached to 99th Brigade, 33rd Division in June 1915 and transferred to 5th Brigade in 2nd Division in December 1915. Famous recruits included the millionaire politician Sir Herbert Raphael and cricketer C. P. McGahey. Training took place at Hare Hall near Romford. Amongst those recruited was Frederic Thomas Horne, the Liberal Agent for West Gloucestershire, who fell at the Somme on 5 September 1916.

== Insignia ==
The cap badge of the Royal Fusiliers was a 'grenade' with the Tudor rose surrounded by a garter with the motto 'Honi Soit Qui Mal y Pense' superimposed on the 'bomb' of the grenade.

When it comprised four RF battalions as part of 33rd Division, 99th Bde adopted coloured cloth 'grenade' badges sewn onto the back of the uniform to identify individual battalions: 23rd RF wore this in pale blue, 24th RF in green. 2nd Division did not employ such 'battle flashes'. 2nd Division's formation sign was a black oval with three 8-pointed stars, the centre one red, flanked by two smaller white stars.

== Soldiers ==
=== Footballers ===
| Rank | Name | Nationality | Club prior to enlistment | Battalion(s) | Wartime death date | Wartime death place | Decorations | Ref |
|---|---|---|---|---|---|---|---|---|
| Sgt | Arthur Evans | England | Exeter City | 24th | 31 July 1916 (aged 28–29) | Somme, France | — | |
| Sgt | Jack Cartmell | England | Abertillery | 24th | — | — | — | |
| Sgt | Henry Littlewort | England | Glossop | 23rd, 30th | — | — | — | |
| Lce Cpl | Charles Clunas | Scotland | Clyde | 23rd | 8 February 1916 (aged 21) | Pas-de-Calais, France | — | |
| Pte | Patsy Hendren | England | Brentford | 23rd | — | — | — | |
| Pte | Harry Owen | England | Southend United | 23rd | 13 March 1916 (aged 34) | Souchez, France | — | |
| Pte | Ginger Owers | England | Clyde | 23rd | — | — | — | |
| Pte | Henry Purver | England | Brentford | 24th | 31 July 1916 (aged 25) | Delville Wood, France | — | |

== 30th (Reserve) Battalion ==
The depot companies of the two Sportsman's battalions at Romford were formed into the 30th (Reserve) Battalion, Royal Fusiliers, on 13 July 1915. During 1915 its headquarters were in Hornchurch, Leamington Spa, Oxford, and finally at the Fort in Leith. On 1 September 1916 it became 106th Training Reserve Battalion, and on 6 September 1917 it was redesignated 259th (Infantry) Battalion, Training Reserve. On 1 November 1917 it reverted to the regiment as 51st (Graduated) Battalion, Royal Fusiliers, at Ipswich in 215th Brigade, 72nd Division. By March 1918 it was in 204th Bde, 68th Division, at Newmarket, where it continued training recruits for the rest of the war. After the Armistice with Germany it was converted into a service battalion on 8 February 1919. On 3 April 1919 it was absorbed into 17th (Service) Battalion, Royal Fusiliers (Empire), serving as part of the British Army of the Rhine.

== Second World War ==
During the Second World War a new 23rd Battalion, Royal Fusiliers, was formed on 9 October 1940 from 50th (previously 14th) Holding Battalion. On 11 July 1941 it was converted into 46th Battalion, Reconnaissance Corps.

== Memorial ==
There is a bronze plaque to the 23rd Royal Fusiliers in St Andrew's Church, Hornchurch. The inscription reads:

THIS TABLET IS ERECTED TO /THE GLORY OF GOD AND IN / MEMORY OF THE 700 MEMBERS / OF THE 23rd SERVICE BATTALION / OF THE ROYAL REGIMENT OF FUSILIERS / WHO FELL IN THE GREAT WAR 1914-1918 / THE BATTALION RAISED IN OCTOBER 1914 / AS THE 1st SPORTSMAN'S BATTALION / UNDERWENT ITS EARLY TRAINING AT / GREY TOWERS HORNCHURCH / AND SERVED IN FLANDERS & FRANCE / BEING THE LAST SERVICE BATTALION / TO BE DISBANDED WHILE ACTING IN / THE ARMY OF OCCUPATION IN GERMANY
