= 33rd Division (United Kingdom) =

Infantry division of the British Army during the First World War

- Active: July 1915 – 30 June 1919
- Country: United Kingdom
- Branch: British Army
- Type: Infantry
- Part of: K4 Army Group
- Engagements: First World War Battle of the Somme (1916) Battle of Bazentin Ridge Battle of High Wood Battle of Arras (1917) Third Battle of Ypres

Commanders
- Notable commanders: Herman Landon; Reginald Pinney

The 33rd Division was an infantry division of the British Army that was raised in 1914, during the First World War. The division was raised from volunteers for Lord Kitchener's New Armies, that was originally made up of infantry battalions raised by public subscription or private patronage. The division was taken over by the War Office in September 1915. It served in France and Belgium in the trenches of the Western Front for the duration of the war. The division's insignia was the "double-three" from a set of dominoes.

== Formation history ==
The Division was one of the six created for the Fourth New Army on 10 December 1914. It landed in France in November 1915. Major-General Herman Landon took command of the division on its arrival. It saw action at the Battle of the Somme in autumn 1916 and, after Major General Reginald Pinney had taken command, it also saw action at the Battle of Arras in April / May 1917 and the Battle of Passchendaele in autumn 1917. It was disbanded in June 1919.

== Order of battle ==
The following units served with the Division:

19th Brigade

(The brigade joined from the 2nd Division in November 1915, swapping with the 99th Brigade.)

- 1st Battalion Middlesex Regiment (transferred to 98th Brigade 27 November 1915)
- 2nd Battalion, Argyll and Sutherland Highlanders (transferred to 98th Brigade 27 November 1915)
- 2nd Battalion, Royal Welsh Fusiliers (left February 1918)
- 1st Battalion, Cameronians (Scottish Rifles)
- 1/5th Battalion, Cameronians (Scottish Rifles) (Territorial Force (TF)) (merged with 1/6th Battalion in May 1916 becoming 5th/6th Battalion)
- 18th (Service) Battalion, Royal Fusiliers (1st Public Schools) (transferred from 98th Brigade 27 November 1915 left 26 February 1916)
- 20th (Service) Battalion, (3rd Public Schools), Royal Fusiliers (transferred from 98th Brigade 27 November 1915 disbanded February 1918)
- 1st Battalion, Queen's (Royal West Surrey Regiment) (transferred from 100th Brigade 14 February 1918)
- 19th Machine Gun Company (formed 24 February 1916, moved to 33rd Battalion Machine Gun Corps (M.G.C.) 19 February 1918)
- 19th Trench Mortar Battery (formed by 24 June 1916)

98th Brigade

- 18th (Service) Battalion, Royal Fusiliers (1st Public Schools) (transferred to 19th Brigade 27 November 1915)
- 19th (Service) Battalion, Royal Fusiliers (2nd Public Schools) (left 28 February 1916)
- 20th (Service) Battalion, Royal Fusiliers (3rd Public Schools) (to 19th Brigade 27 November 1915)
- 21st (Service) Battalion, Royal Fusiliers (4th Public Schools) (left 28 February 1916)
- 1st Battalion, Middlesex Regiment (transferred from 19th Brigade 27 November 1915)
- 2nd Battalion, Argyll and Sutherland Highlanders (transferred from 19th Brigade 27 November 1915)
- 4th (Extra Reserve) Battalion, King's (Liverpool Regiment) (Special Reserve (SR)) (joined February 1916)
- 1/4th Battalion, Suffolk Regiment (TF) (joined 28 February 1916 left February 1918)
- 98th Machine Gun Company (joined 28 April 1916, moved to 33rd Battalion M.G.C. 19 February 1918)
- 98th Trench Mortar Battery(formed by 30 June 1916)

99th Brigade

(The brigade transferred to the 2nd Division in November 1915, swapping with the 19th Brigade.)

- 17th (Service) Battalion, Royal Fusiliers (Empire)
- 22nd (Service) Battalion, Royal Fusiliers (Kensington)
- 23rd (Service) Battalion, Royal Fusiliers (1st Sportsman's)
- 24th (Service) Battalion, Royal Fusiliers (2nd Sportsman's)

100th Brigade

- 13th (Service) Battalion, Essex Regiment (West Ham) (left 22 December 1915)
- 16th (Service) Battalion, Middlesex Regiment (Public Schools) (left 25 February 1916)
- 17th (Service) Battalion, Middlesex Regiment (1st Football) (Left 8 December 1915)
- 16th (Service) Battalion, King's Royal Rifle Corps (Church Lads' Brigade),
- 1st Battalion, Queen's (Royal West Surrey Regiment) (joined 15 December 1915 transferred to 19th Brigade 14 February 1918)
- 2nd Battalion, Worcestershire Regiment (joined 20 December 1915)
- 1/6th Battalion Cameronians (Scottish Rifles) (TF) (joined and left February 1918)
- 1/9th Battalion (Glasgow Highlanders), Highland Light Infantry (TF) (joined 29 May 1916)
- 100th Machine Gun Company (joined 28 April 1916, moved to 33rd Battalion M.G.C. 19 February 1918)
- 100th Trench Mortar Battery (formed by 13 June 1916)

Divisional Troops

- 18th (Service) Battalion, (1st Public Works Pioneers), Middlesex Regiment (joined as Divisional Pioneer Battalion July 1915)
- 19th Motor Machine Gun Battery (joined November 1915 but left 6 February 1916)
- 248th Machine Gun Company (joined 21 July 1917, moved to 33rd Battalion M.G.C. 19 Feb 1918)
- 33rd Battalion M.G.C. (formed 19 February 1918 absorbing the brigade MG companies)
- Divisional Mounted Troops
  - F Squadron, North Irish Horse (joined January 1915, redesignated B Sqn on 25 May 1916, left 19 April 1916)
  - 33rd Divisional Cyclist Company, Army Cyclist Corps (left 19 April 1916)
- 33rd Divisional Train Army Service Corps
  - 225th, 226th, 227th and 228th Companies (transferred to 29th Division in March 1916)
  - 170th, 171st, 172nd and 173rd Companies, (transferred from 28th Divisional Train on 13 November 1915. 172nd Company swapped with the 8th Company from 2nd Divisional Train in late November 1915)
- 43rd Mobile Veterinary Section Army Veterinary Corps
- 230th Divisional Employment Company (joined 1 June 1917)

33rd (Camberwell) Divisional Artillery

- CLVI (Camberwell) Brigade, Royal Field Artillery (R.F.A.)
- CLXII (Camberwell) Brigade, R.F.A.
- CLXVI (Camberwell) Brigade, R.F.A. (broken up 12 September 1916)
- CLXVII (Camberwell) (Howitzer) Brigade, R.F.A. (broken up 12 September 1916)
- 126th (Camberwell) Heavy Battery, Royal Garrison Artillery (R.G.A.) (left for XXII Heavy Artillery Group on 2 May 1916)
- 33rd Divisional Ammunition Column R.F.A.
- 33rd Divisional Trench Mortar Brigade
  - V.33 Heavy Trench Mortar Battery, R.F.A. (formed by 29 May 1916; broken up February 1918)
  - X.33, Y.33 and Z.33 Medium Mortar Batteries, R.F.A. (formed by 4 May 1916, February 1918, Z broken up redistributed to Z and Y batteries)

33rd Divisional Engineers

- 212th (Tottenham) Field Company, Royal Engineers
- 222nd (Tottenham) Field Company, Royal Engineers
- 226th (Tottenham) Field Company, Royal Engineers (left for 2nd Division 2 December 1915)
- 33rd (Tottenham) Divisional Signals Company, Royal Engineers
- 11th Field Company (joined from 2nd Division 2 December 1915)

Royal Army Medical Corps

- 99th Field Ambulance
- 100th Field Ambulance (left for 2nd Division late November 1915)
- 101st Field Ambulance
- 73rd Sanitary Section (left 31 March 1917)
- 19th Field Ambulance (joined from 2nd Division late November 1915)

== Commanders ==
- Major-General Herman Landon November 1915 – September 1916
- Major-General Reginald John Pinney September 1916 – September 1917
- Brigadier-General Philip Richard Wood September 1917 – November 1917
- Major-General Reginald John Pinney November 1917 – February 1919 (disbandment)

== See also ==
- List of British divisions in World War I

== Bibliography ==
- Seton Hutchinson, G. (2004) [1921]. The Thirty-Third Division in France and Flanders 1915–1919 (facs. repr. Naval & Military Press, Uckfield ed.). London: Waterlow & Sons. ISBN 1-84342-995-0.
