= John Patten (footballer) =

British footballer

Personal information
- Date of birth: Not known
- Place of birth: Not known
- Date of death: Not known
- Position: Outside right

Senior career*
Years	Team	Apps	(Gls)
19??–1907	Shrewsbury		
1907	Southampton	4	(2)
1907–19??	Shrewsbury		
- * Club domestic league appearances and goals

John Patten was a British footballer who played four matches, scoring twice, for Southampton in the Southern League in 1907.

== Football career ==
Patten had played for Shrewsbury before coming to Southampton for a trial in March 1907. He had originally expected to play a reserve-team match at Ryde but, because of an injury crisis which had sidelined Jack Hogg, Alex Glen and Bill Gray, he was included in the first-team for the Southern League match against Watford on 30 March 1907, which ended 0–0. The local press commented that "his policy of parting before an opponent can get to him is to be commended". He retained his place for the next two matches, scoring in a 3–2 defeat against West Ham United and a 4–2 victory at Northampton Town. He then lost his place to Edward Bell for two matches before being recalled for the final match of the season.

Despite his record of two goals from four matches, Patten was not given a contract by Southampton and returned to Shrewsbury.
