= 100th Brigade (United Kingdom) =

- Active: 1914–1918, 1945–1946
- Allegiance: United Kingdom
- Branch: Infantry
- Part of: 33rd Division (United Kingdom)
- Engagements: Western Front, War in Vietnam (1945–1946)

The 100th Brigade was a formation of the British Army founded during World War I. It was raised as part of the new army also known as Kitchener's Army and assigned to the 33rd Division. The brigade served on the Western Front. The brigade saw additional action during Britain's involvement in Vietnam following the Second World War.

== Action in World War I ==
=== Battle of the Somme ===
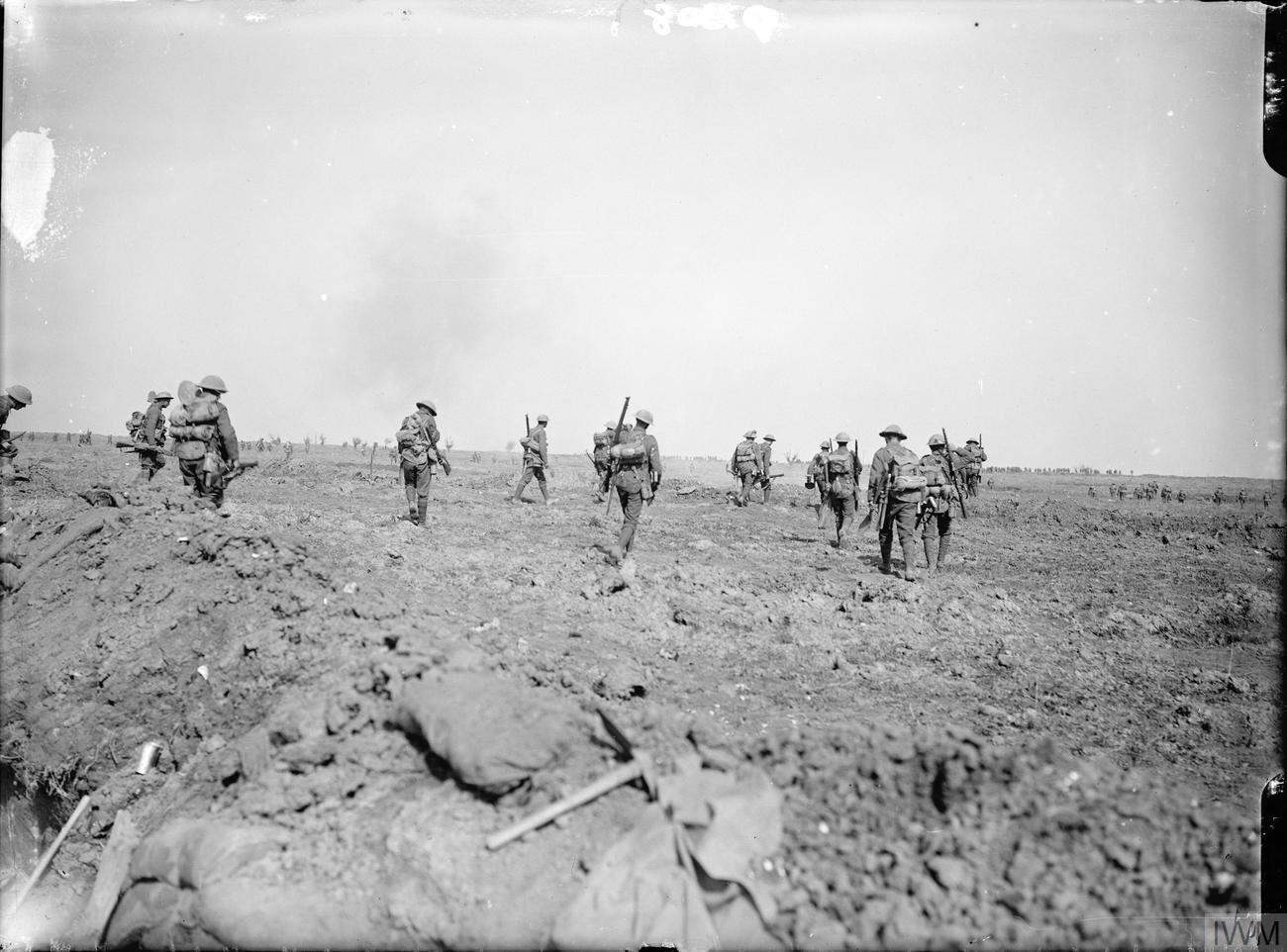
The Battle of the Somme, July–November 1916

The 100th Brigade, arrived at Saleux, France on 9 July 1916, arrived at Morlancourt on 11 July, Bécordel-Bécourt on 12 July, and Flatiron Copse on 14 July. It began an attack on High Wood, a small but highly contested forested area in the Somme, on 15 July during the Allied withdrawal, withdrew itself to Mametz Wood on 16 July, and returned to Becordel-Becourt on 22 July. The brigade camped between Albert and Dernancourt on 23 July, and went to reinforce the 6th Seaforth battalion who were entrenched near High Wood. The 2nd Battalion then advanced with a new trench on 9 August and was replaced by the 16th Battalion of the King's Royal Rifle Corps, which was also part of the 100th Brigade. The 2nd Battalion then traveled to Mametz Wood on 10 August, Becordel-Becourt on 13 August, and Delville Wood on 19 August. On 24 August, the 100th Brigade attacked Tea Trench near High Wood but failed to take the position. The brigade was then relieved, traveled to Ribemont on 30 August, to Molliens-au-Bois on 31 August, to the north of Gommecourt on 19 September, and to Corbie on 19 October. It then relieved the 2nd Worcestershire Regiment at Frosty Trench on 2 November, and successfully took Hazy Trench on 5 November. It then traveled to Carnoy on 6 November, Citadel Camp on 7 November, and Airaines on 10 November.

== Action in Vietnam ==
During Britain's involvement in protecting French-held Vietnam from the communist Viet Minh, General Douglas Gracey called for reinforcements, namely the 32nd Brigade (United Kingdom) and the 100th Brigade. Upon its arrival at Saigon on 17 October 1945, led by Lt. Colonel C.H.B. Rodham, the brigade was ordered to retake the region in between the towns of Thủ Đức, Biên Hòa, and Thủ Dầu Một from the Viet Minh. The operation to control that region began on 23 October, with the brigade occupying Thu Duc on the same day, Bien Hoa the next, and Thu Dau Mot on 25 October. This action allowed General Gracey to gather and transport to Japan the Japanese troops remaining in Vietnam from the recently ended Second World War. On 27 December, the 100th Brigade was tasked with maintaining control in Saigon and deporting the remaining Japanese forces. Based on a scouting report received on 31 December, the brigade mounted an attack on Viet Minh positions from 1–5 January 1946, and defended an assault from the Viet Minh on 3 January. In concordance with the drawdown of British forces so that French colonial forces would control the entirety of Vietnam, the 80th Brigade (operating in Vietnam with the 100th Brigade) was taken off duty on 11 January and departed Vietnam on 22 January. General Gracey departed Vietnam on 28 January, and the 100th Brigade left Saigon for good on 8 February in the SS Cameronia, concluding their action in Vietnam.

== Formation ==
The infantry battalions did not all serve at once, but all were assigned to the brigade during the war:

- 13th (Service) Battalion, Essex Regiment (West Ham)
- 16th (Service) Battalion, Middlesex Regiment (Public Schools)
- 17th (Service) Battalion, Middlesex Regiment (1st Football)
- 16th (Service) Battalion, King's Royal Rifle Corps (Church Lads Brigade)
- 1st Battalion, Queen's Royal Regiment (West Surrey)
- 2nd Battalion, Worcestershire Regiment
- 1/6th Battalion, Cameronians (Scottish Rifles)
- 1/9th Battalion, Highland Light Infantry
- 100th Machine Gun Company
- 100th Trench Mortar Battery

== Bibliography ==
- Westlake, Ray (6 June 2004). British Battalions on the Somme: Battles & Engagements of the 616 Infantry Battalions Involved in the Battle of the Somme. Pen and Sword. ISBN 9781844680177.
- Prenderghast, Gerald (20 August 2015). Britain and the Wars in Vietnam: The Supply of Troops, Arms and Intelligence, 1945–1975 (illustrated ed.). McFarland. p. 26. ISBN 9780786499243.
