= 99th Brigade (United Kingdom) =

British brigade during WWI

The 99th Brigade was a formation of the British Army during the First World War. It was raised as part of the new army also known as Kitchener's Army and assigned to the 33rd Division. The brigade served on the Western Front. In November 1915, the brigade was transferred to the 2nd Division.

== Formation ==
The brigade was initially formed of four war-raised Service Battalions from the Royal Fusiliers, primarily recruited from London.

- 17th (Service) Battalion, Royal Fusiliers (Empire)
- 22nd (Service) Battalion, Royal Fusiliers (Kensington)
- 23rd (Service) Battalion, Royal Fusiliers (1st Sportsmen's)
- 24th (Service) Battalion, Royal Fusiliers (2nd Sportsmen's)

The 17th was formed by the British Empire Committee, a recruiting organisation chaired by General Sir Bindon Blood, Herbert Nield, the Conservative MP for Ealing, and Major-General Lionel Herbert. The committee was authorised to raise a battalion on 30 August; they had completed recruitment and moved into camp by 12 September, under the command of Colonel George Robert Harland Bowden MP. The 22nd was raised by the Mayor of Kensington, William Davison, and included two companies of volunteers from the borough as well as two of colonial volunteers from the King Edward's Horse. The 23rd and 24th "Sportsmen's Battalions" were raised by Mrs Cunliffe-Owen, daughter of Sir Philip Cunliffe-Owen, who offered to raise "a complete battalion of upper and middle class men, physically fit, able to shoot and ride, up to the age of forty-five"; in the event, she provided a second as well. The men of the 23rd and 24th were a varied group of British and Colonial adventurers, including engineers, fur trappers, big-game hunters, and athletes.

During training in England, the brigade was reinforced with the 1/5th Battalion, King's (Liverpool) Regiment, and the 1st Battalion, Royal Berkshire Regiment. The 99th Brigade was sent to France in November 1915 as part of 33rd Division, but was quickly transferred to the 2nd Division in exchange for a veteran brigade of regular and territorial troops. Many of its units were rotated out to other brigades at this point, and by the end of 1915 it consisted of:

- 17th Battalion, Royal Fusiliers (Empire)
- 22nd Battalion, Royal Fusiliers (Kensington)
- 23rd Battalion, Royal Fusiliers (1st Sportsmen's)
- 1st Battalion, King's Royal Rifle Corps

The brigade remained on the Western Front with 2nd Division for the remainder of the war.
