= Edward Bell (footballer) =

British footballer

Personal information
- Full name: Edward Inkerman Jordan Bell
- Date of birth: 1886
- Place of birth: Gibraltar
- Date of death: 24 March 1918 (aged 32)
- Place of death: Somme, France
- Position: Outside forward

Youth career
- South Farnborough

Senior career*
Years	Team	Apps	(Gls)
1907	Crystal Palace	0	(0)
1907–1908	Southampton	4	(0)
1908–1911	South Farnborough		
- * Club domestic league appearances and goals

Edward Inkerman Jordan Bell MC* (1886 – 24 March 1918) was a British professional footballer who played for Southampton in the early 20th century. He later was a soldier who was twice awarded for gallantry in the First World War but died in the Battle of the Somme in March 1918.

== Football career ==
Bell was born in Gibraltar, the son of Maj. E. I. Bell (Royal Fusiliers), and Minnie Bell and given the middle name "Inkerman", presumably a reference to his father's military service. His father was later stationed at Aldershot and Bell played his early football for South Farnborough.

After a short period with Crystal Palace as an amateur in February 1907, when he made a small number of appearances in the reserve team in the London and Western League, and a trial with Portsmouth, Bell was signed by Southampton of the Southern League in March 1907. He went straight into the team, making two appearances at outside-right in April as a replacement for triallist J. Patten; both matches, against Queens Park Rangers and Fulham, ended in 3–0 defeats. Bell made two more appearances in the 1907–08 season, as a replacement for John Bainbridge and was released at the end of the season.

== Later career ==
Bell returned to South Farnborough and was re-instated as an amateur, working as a Government Contracts Inspector.

He has been confused with E.J. Bell who made four first-team appearances for Portsmouth at the start of the 1910–11 season, having previously played for Exeter City.

== Military career ==
During the First World War, he joined the 17th Battalion of the Middlesex Regiment (the "Footballers' Battalion"), achieving the rank of captain. In July 1916, his commanding officer, Major Frank Buckley (later to become manager of several football clubs, including Blackpool, Wolves and Leeds United) was wounded at Delville Wood, and Bell assumed command of the battalion. In October 1916, he was awarded the Military Cross for his actions during the battle. The citation states:

Finding himself in command of the battalion he repelled a counter-attack with great determination. On another occasion he rescued several men from a blown-in dugout.

Following the disbanding of the battalion in February 1918, Bell was attached to the 99th Infantry Brigade. He was killed on 24 March 1918 in the Battle of the Somme and buried at the Albert Communal Cemetery.

In July 1918, he received a posthumous "bar" to his Military Cross for conspicuous gallantry and devotion to duty. The citation reads:

While holding a section of the front line he located and supervised the formation of forward dumps of ammunition and material. He carried out the work in daylight close to the enemy, and often under very heavy shell and machine-gun fire.

== Family ==
He left a widow, Edith Anne Bell. Their son, born in October 1918 six months after Bell's death, was named after his father. In the Second World War, he became an acting Squadron Leader in the Royal Air Force, before being captured and imprisoned in Stalag Luft III. Awarded the DFC, he later served in the Korean War in the North Staffordshire Regiment and retired as a Major.
