= Frederick William Palmer =

English Victoria Cross recipient (1891-1955)

- Born: 11 November 1891; Hammersmith, London
- Died: 10 September 1955 (aged 63); Lymington Hospital, Hampshire
- Military career
- Allegiance: United Kingdom
- Branch: British Army; Royal Air Force
- Rank: Wing Commander
- Units: The Royal Fusiliers; Royal Flying Corps
- Conflicts: World War I World War II
- Awards: Victoria Cross; Military Medal

Frederick William Palmer VC MM (11 November 1891 – 10 September 1955) was an English recipient of the Victoria Cross, the highest and most prestigious award for gallantry in the face of the enemy that can be awarded to British and Commonwealth forces.

== Details ==
He was 20 years old, and a Lance-Sergeant in the 22nd Battalion, The Royal Fusiliers, British Army during the First World War when the following deed took place for which he was awarded the VC.

On 16/17 February 1917 north of Courcelette, France, Lance-Sergeant Palmer assumed command of his company when all his officers had become casualties. Having cut his way under point-blank fire, through wire entanglements, he dislodged an enemy machine-gun and established a "block". He then collected some other men and held the barricade for nearly three hours against seven determined counter-attacks. While he was fetching more bombs an eighth counter-attack was delivered, threatening the advance of the whole flank. At this critical moment, although suffering from extreme exhaustion, he rallied his men, drove back the enemy and maintained his position.

He later achieved the rank of Second Lieutenant. When his battalion was disbanded, he joined the RFC as an observer.

After the war, he went to Malaya, where he set up in business. After the outbreak of the Second World War, he returned to England in 1940, arriving just in time for the Battle of Britain, and re-joined the Royal Air Force. He achieved the rank of Wing-Commander, and was mentioned in dispatches at the end of the war. He then returned to Malaya.

He retired to the south of England in 1950.

== Bibliography ==
- Gliddon, Gerald (2012) [2004]. Arras and Messines 1917. VCs of the First World War. Stroud, Gloucestershire: The History Press. ISBN 978-0-7524-6604-0.
- Monuments to Courage (David Harvey, 1999)
- The Register of the Victoria Cross (This England, 1997)
