= William Davison, 1st Baron Broughshane =

British politician

Major The Right Honourable The Lord Broughshane KBE FSA JP DL
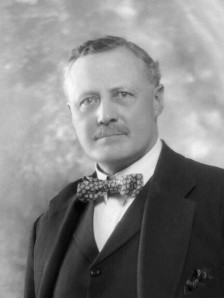
- Davison in 1928, by Bassano Ltd

Member of Parliament for Kensington South
- In office 14 December 1918 – 1 November 1945
- Preceded by: Lord Claud Hamilton
- Succeeded by: Richard Law

Personal details
- Born: 1 January 1872 Broughshane, Co Antrim, Ireland
- Died: 19 January 1953 (aged 81)
- Spouse(s): Beatrice Roberts (m. 1898, div, 1929); Louisa Marriott (m. 1929)
- Children: Patrick, 2nd Baron; Kensington, 3rd Baron; 2 daughters
- Parent(s): Richard Davison and Annie Patrick
- Education: Keble College, Oxford
- Known for: politics

William Henry Davison, 1st Baron Broughshane, KBE, FSA, JP, DL (1872 – 19 January 1953) was a British peer and Conservative Member of Parliament (MP) for Kensington South for 27 years.

== Early life ==
Davison was born in Broughshane, County Antrim, the son of Richard Davison and his wife Annie née Patrick. He was educated at Shrewsbury and graduated from Keble College, Oxford, in 1895 with a Bachelor of Arts. In 1895, he was admitted to the Inner Temple as a barrister and earned his Master of Arts from Keble three years later in 1898. The same year, he married Beatrice Mary Roberts, a daughter of Sir Owen Roberts (and future great-aunt of Anthony Armstrong-Jones), and they later had four children.

== Political career ==
In 1913, he became Mayor of Kensington, where he was resident. During the Great War, he was solely responsible for raising, equipping, clothing, housing and selecting the officers for the 22nd (Service) Battalion, Royal Fusiliers (Kensington). The new volunteer ('Pals') battalion was greeted with great enthusiasm, Davison enthusing their patriotism, encouraging his heroes to great efforts. He was a popular figure in the Royal Borough. In taking the rank of Major, he went with them to train on the Sussex Downs. On their disbandment in February 1918, their former commanding officer, Brigadier-General Randle Barnett Barker wrote, "The 22nd never lost a trench or failed their comrades in the day of battle". For that effort, Davison was knighted in the 1918 New Year Honours, when he was selected for the seat of Kensington South and elected for the Coupon on 14 December 1918.

Davison was a very active Unionist member in regular attendance at debates. Although an English backbencher, he had spent time in Ireland and took its historical disadvantages very seriously. In 1919, he supported the police application to the Coalition government for extra taxes, pay and pension arrangements in that troubled province. As well as the armed services, he promoted pensions for millions of servicemen and women after demobilisation. He called on the government to give more transparent explanations as to the cost of its taxation demands and early on was one of the MPs behind a deposit system towards responsible candidate selection at election time. Davison commented widely on industrial matters and pointied out that he was neither a miner nor an owner. His truly impartial position, in his opinion, was supporting "improved conditions" and a decent standard of living for miners and a fair price for coal. Fairness extended for him also to bacon and butter for the Irish people in the midst of a war against Britain and also towards the defeated Germans, who should not, in his opinion, have lost so much in reparations. Davison believed in free trade, commodification and price reduction of items like tobacco. In one speech, he linked "high prices resulting in national unrest" to the need for increased industrial production.

Davison did much for the conservation of the Royal Borough. In Parliament, he spoke against demolition of listed buildings by the council.

In 1930, after he had been for decades a Unionist, he became Conservative.

During the war, he was a loyal friend to Winston Churchill and defended the Prime Minister when the Conservatives were verbally attacked in the Commons by truculent Labour left-wingers. From the very outset, Davison had pressed Neville Chamberlain to take prompt action against the British Union of Fascists' leader, Oswald Mosley. Davison stood up for the poor in war-torn London and asked for workmen's dwellings to be exempt from being taxed by the War Damage Contribution. Observing in one debate that in his constituency there was a "notable lack of panic."

== Family ==
He married Beatrice, daughter of Sir Owen Roberts of Henley Park and Plas Dinas in 1898. They had two sons later to inherit the title, and two daughters. In 1929, he divorced his wife and remarried on 6 June to Louisa Mary Constance, daughter of Major Charles Marriott.

== Later life ==
On 1 November 1945, Davison resigned his seat by being raised to the peerage as Baron Broughshane of Kensington in the County of London shortly after the general election. In the subsequent by-election, the Conservative candidate held on to the constituency.

Lord Broughshane was a Freeman of the City of London and a wartime Master of the Clothworkers Company. He died in 1953.

Coat of arms of William Davison, 1st Baron Broughshane
Crest Upon a billet fesswise a stag’s head between two wings Or. Escutcheon Gules a stag trippant and in chief a celestial crown and a fleur-de-lys Or. Supporters On either side a stag Or gorged with a chain gules and pendent therefrom a torteau the dexter charged with a portcullis and the sinister with a grenade fired Or. Motto Virtus In Actione Consistit (Strength Consists In Action)

Parliament of the United Kingdom
Preceded by Lord Claud Hamilton	Member for Parliament for Kensington South; 1918–1945	Succeeded by Richard Law
Peerage of the United Kingdom
New creation	Baron Broughshane; 1945–1953	Succeeded by Patrick Davison
