= Montauban-de-Picardie =

- Commune
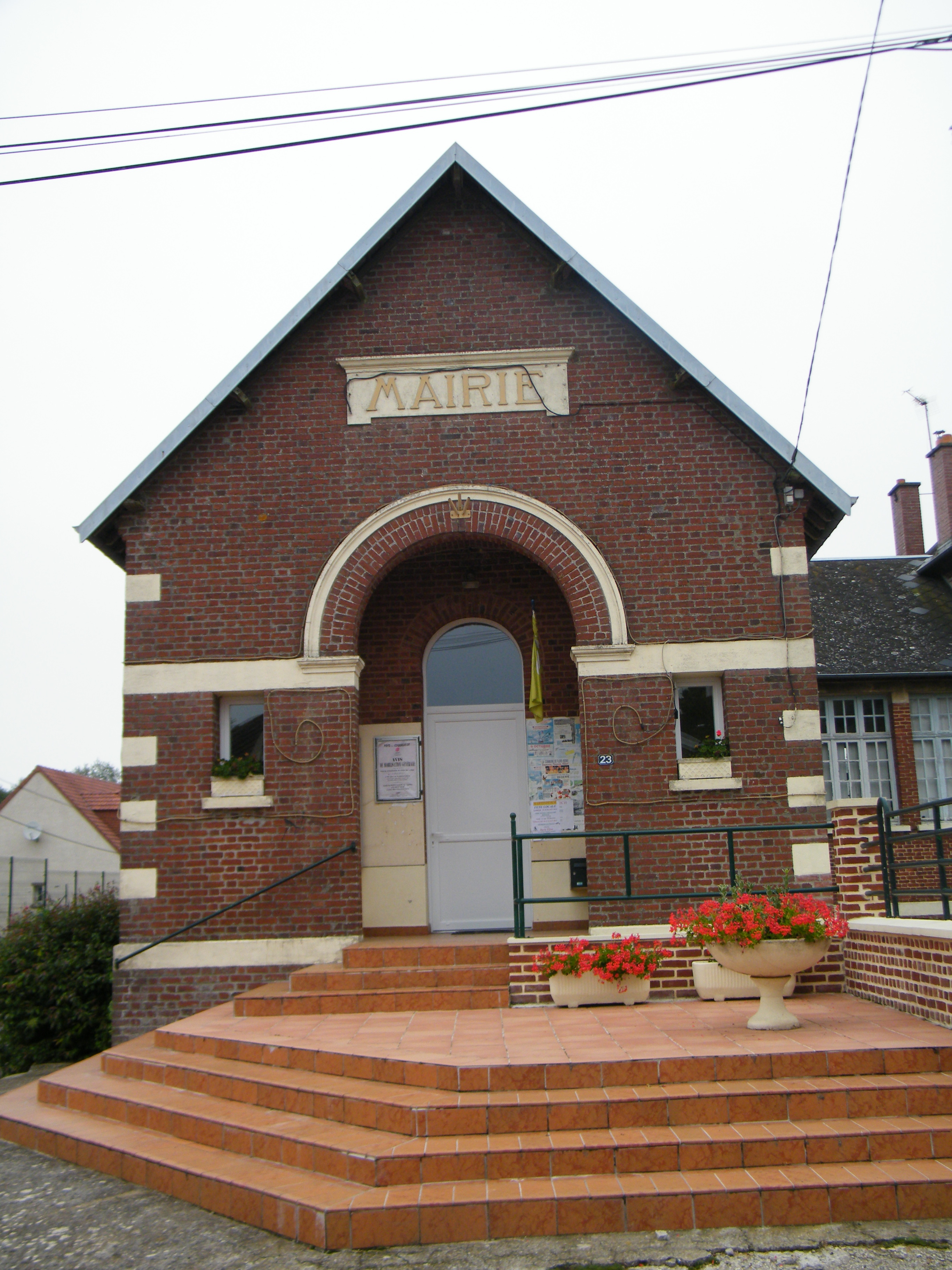
- The town hall in Montauban-de-Picardie
- Location of Montauban-de-Picardie
- Location within France Location within Hauts-de-France
- Coordinates: 50°00′26″N 2°46′48″E
- Country: France
- Region: Hauts-de-France
- Department: Somme
- Arrondissement: Péronne
- Canton: Albert
- Intercommunality: Pays du Coquelicot

Government
  - Mayor (2020–2026): Annabel Paruch
- Area^{1}: 7.67 km^{2} (2.96 sq mi)
- Elevation: 139 m (456 ft)
- Highest elevation: 143 m (469 ft)
- Lowest elevation: 89 m (292 ft)
- Population (2023): 217
  - Density: 28.3/km^{2} (73.3/sq mi)
- Time zone: UTC+01:00 (CET)
  - Summer (DST): UTC+02:00 (CEST)
- INSEE/Postal code: 80560 /80300
- ^{1} French Land Register data, which excludes lakes, ponds, glaciers > 1 km^{2} (0.386 sq mi or 247 acres) and river estuaries.

Montauban-de-Picardie (French pronunciation: [mɔ̃tobɑ̃ də pikaʁdi], literally Montauban of Picardie; Picard: Montaubin-d'Picardie) is a commune in the Somme department in Hauts-de-France in northern France. Its inhabitants are called Montalbanais in French.

== Geography ==
The commune is situated on the D64 road, some 20 miles (32 km) northeast of Amiens.

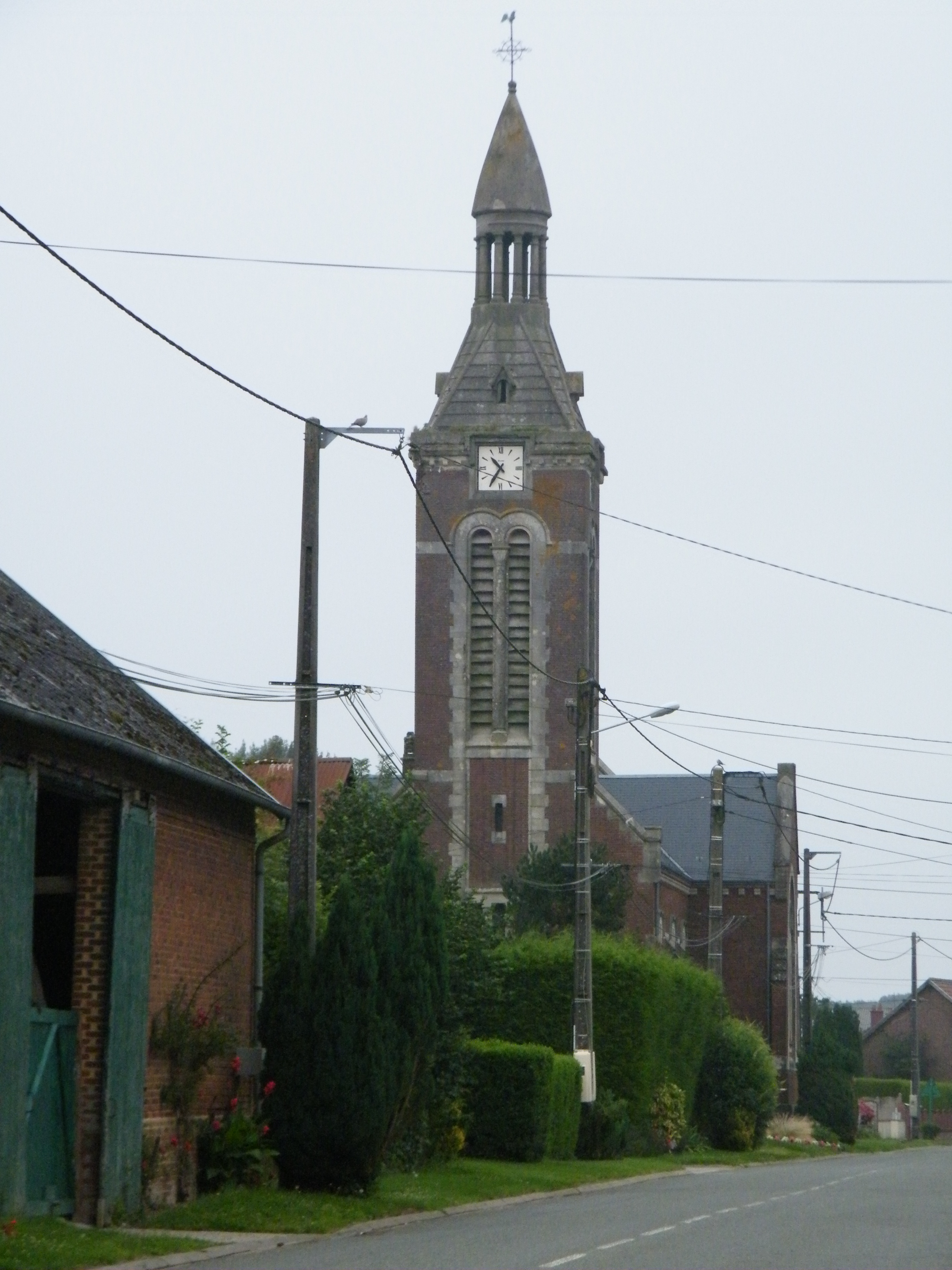
St. Giles church.

== History ==
=== First World War ===
The village lies on the First World War battlefield of the Somme. Montauban lay close behind the German front-line and was turned into a fortified strongpoint. On 1 July 1916, the first day on the Somme, the village was seized by the British 30th Division in one of the few successful British advances of the day. In the village itself there is a monument to the Liverpool and Manchester 'Pals', who, as part of the 30th Division, were the first to reach the village.

== Population ==
Historical population
Year	Pop.	±% p.a.
1968	215	—
1975	183	−2.28%
1982	176	−0.56%
1990	186	+0.69%
1999	197	+0.64%
2007	214	+1.04%
2012	236	+1.98%
2017	214	−1.94%
2023	217	+0.23%
Source: INSEE

== See also ==
- Communes of the Somme department
