= Charles Clunas =

Scottish footballer

Personal information
- Full name: Charles Clunas
- Date of birth: 13 February 1894
- Place of birth: Johnstone, Scotland
- Date of death: 8 February 1916 (aged 21)
- Place of death: Givenchy-lès-la-Bassée, France
- Positions: Forward; right half

Senior career*
Years	Team	Apps	(Gls)
–1912	Kilbarchan Athletic		
1912–1914	Clyde	19	(3)
- * Club domestic league appearances and goals

Charles Clunas (13 February 1894 – 8 February 1916) was a Scottish professional footballer who played in the Scottish League for Clyde as a forward.

== Personal life ==
Clunas' younger brother William was also a footballer. Clunas was educated at Johnstone High School. In October 1914, two months after the outbreak of the First World War, he enlisted as a private in the 23rd (Service) Battalion of the Royal Fusiliers in the Central Hotel in Glasgow. Clunas was serving as an appointed lance corporal when he was killed by a rifle grenade at Givenchy-lès-la-Bassée, France on 8 February 1916. He was buried in Guards' Cemetery, Windy Corner, Cuinchy.

== Career statistics ==
Appearances and goals by club, season and competition
Club	Season	League			Scottish Cup		Total	
Club	Season	Division	Apps	Goals	Apps	Goals	Apps	Goals
Clyde	1912–13	Scottish First Division	4	2	1	0	5	2
Clyde	1913–14	Scottish First Division	11	1	0	0	11	1
Clyde	1914–15	Scottish First Division	4	0	―		4	0
Career total			19	3	1	0	20	3
