= James Finlay =

James Finlay may refer to:

- James Finlay (rugby union, born 1852) (1852–1930), Scottish rugby union player
- James Finlay (rugby union, born 1887) (1887–1966), Irish rugby union player
- James Finlay & Co, Scottish cotton manufacturers and merchants
- James Finlay Bangladesh, shipping and tea company

== See also ==
- James Findlay (disambiguation)
- James Finley (disambiguation)
