= Tottenham Royal Engineers =

33rd Divisional Engineers
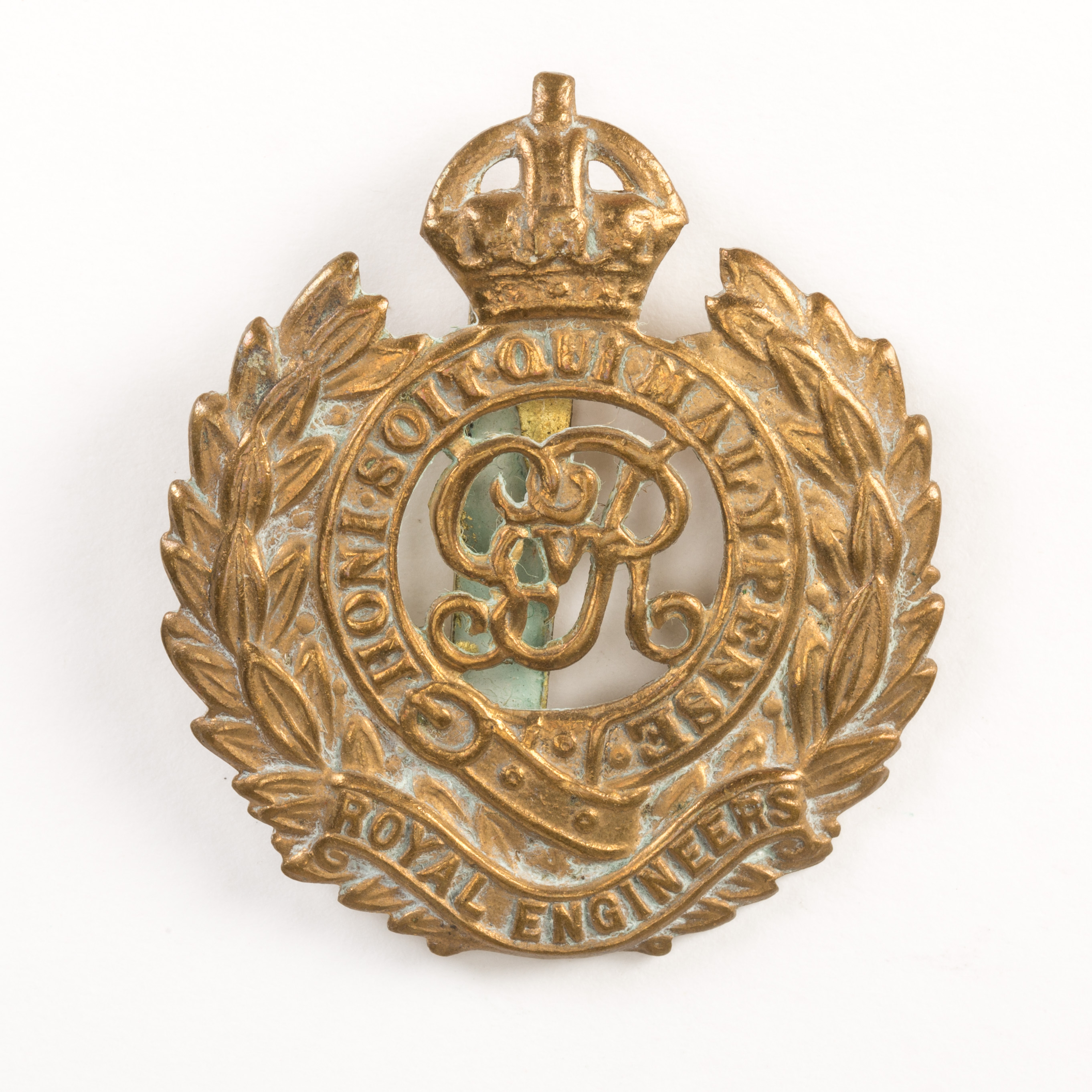
- RE Cap badge (King George V cipher)
- Active: 11 February 1915 – 30 June 1919
- Country: United Kingdom
- Branch: New Army
- Role: Field engineers
- Part of: 33rd Division
- Garrison/HQ: Tottenham
- Nickname(s): Tottenham Royal Engineers
- Engagements: Battle of the Somme; Battle of Arras; Third Battle of Ypres; German spring offensive Hundred Days Offensive

The 33rd Divisional Engineers or Tottenham Royal Engineers was a battalion-sized unit of the British Royal Engineers (RE) raised in Tottenham, London, during World War I as part of 'Kitchener's Army'. Together with other RE units recruited from Tottenham, it served in the great battles of 1916–18 on the Western Front, including the Somme, Arras, Ypres, the German spring offensive and the final Hundred Days Offensive.

== Background ==
Alfred Leete's recruitment poster for Kitchener's Army.

On 6 August 1914, less than 48 hours after Britain's declaration of war, Parliament sanctioned an increase of 500,000 men for the Regular Army and the newly appointed Secretary of State for War, Earl Kitchener of Khartoum, issued his famous call to arms: 'Your King and Country Need You', urging the first 100,000 volunteers to come forward. This group of six divisions with supporting arms became known as Kitchener's First New Army, or 'K1'.

The flood of volunteers overwhelmed the ability of the army to absorb and organise them, and by the time the Fifth New Army (K5) was authorised on 10 December 1914, many of the units were being organised as 'Pals battalions' under the auspices of mayors and corporations of towns up and down the country.

The six K5 divisions were to be numbered 37th to 42nd, but the War Office then decided to convert the K4 battalions into reserve units to train reinforcements for the K1–K3 units, and on 10 May the K5 divisions were renumbered to take up the designations of the K4 formations. The short-lived 40th Division, which had been constituted on 27 April 1915, thus became 33rd Division. The infantry units were Pals' Battalions raised by London regiments (particularly the Public Schools Battalions and Sportsmen's Battalions), and the division's Royal Engineers (RE) were raised in Tottenham, North London.

== Tottenham Royal Engineers ==
On 11 February 1915 the War Office authorised the Tottenham Local Representative Committee, based at Tottenham Town Hall, to raise a field company of the Royal Engineers (RE), to be designated 212th (Field) Company (Tottenham). Soon this recruitment effort was expanded to the full RE complement for a division and then two Army Troops Companies in addition:

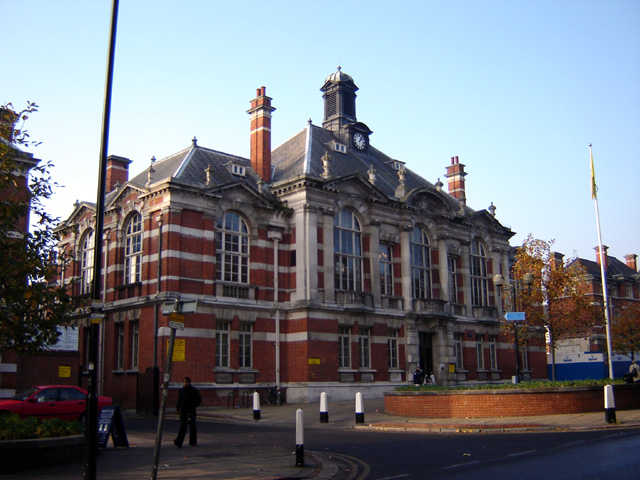
Tottenham Town Hall, where the engineers were recruited in 1915.

- 33rd Divisional Engineers HQ
  - 212th (Tottenham) Field Company, RE
  - 222nd (Tottenham) Field Company, RE
  - 226th (Tottenham) Field Company, RE
  - 33rd (Tottenham) Divisional Signal Company, RE
- 230th (Tottenham) Army Troops Company, RE
- 238th (Tottenham) Army Troops Company, RE

Among the volunteers who joined the Tottenham Royal Engineers were Tottenham Hotspur F.C. footballers Billy Minter and Findlay Weir. Both became serjeants; Minter was wounded and awarded the Meritorious Service Medal, while Weir was killed in action with the unit on 9 July 1918.

The units were formally taken over by the military authorities on 14 July 1915 (later for the Army Troops companies). On that day the 212th and 222nd Field Companies joined the division at Clipstone Camp, Nottinghamshire, and 226th Field Company joined on 31 July, by which time the division had moved to Bulford Camp on Salisbury Plain for intensive battle training. On 4 November the division was ordered to embark for France, and by 21 November it had concentrated around Morbecque, where it joined the British Expeditionary Force (BEF) for service on the Western Front.

On 2 December, the division exchanged its 99th Brigade for the experienced 19th Brigade from the 2nd Division; 226th Field Company went with it to 2nd Division and 33rd Divisional Engineers received the Regular 11th Field Company, RE, in its place.

== Service ==
33rd Divisional insignia.

=== Somme ===
After routine service in the trenches, 33rd Division's first offensive operations came during the Battle of the Somme in 1916. It was in Corps Reserve during the Battle of Albert (12–13 July 1916), but was committed during the Battle of Bazentin Ridge and subsequent Attacks on High Wood (14–21 July). The division's first attack on High Wood on 15 July was a costly failure, but 19th Brigade made a second attempt on 20 July. 1st and 5th/6th Battalions Scottish Rifles led, supported by 20th (3rd Public Schools) Bn Royal Fusiliers with three sections of 11th Field Company and two companies of 18th (1st Public Works) Bn Middlesex Regiment (the divisional pioneers). Initially, the attack was a success, but it became held up by enemy machine guns. With the supports thrown in, the brigade managed to take most of the wood and the pioneers dug in. Holding the gains over the following weeks under heavy shellfire was very costly.

In early August the division was withdrawn for a period of rest before returning to the High Wood–Delville Wood sector on 18 August. The German positions had been strengthened and progress was painfully slow, but the division put in a successful attack on 24 August. The rest of High Wood was finally captured on 24 September, by which time 33rd Division had been relieved. It returned to the Somme later in the year and captured Dewdrop Trench on 28 October, but further progress towards Le Transloy was hampered by ground conditions that the engineers and pioneers struggled to overcome.

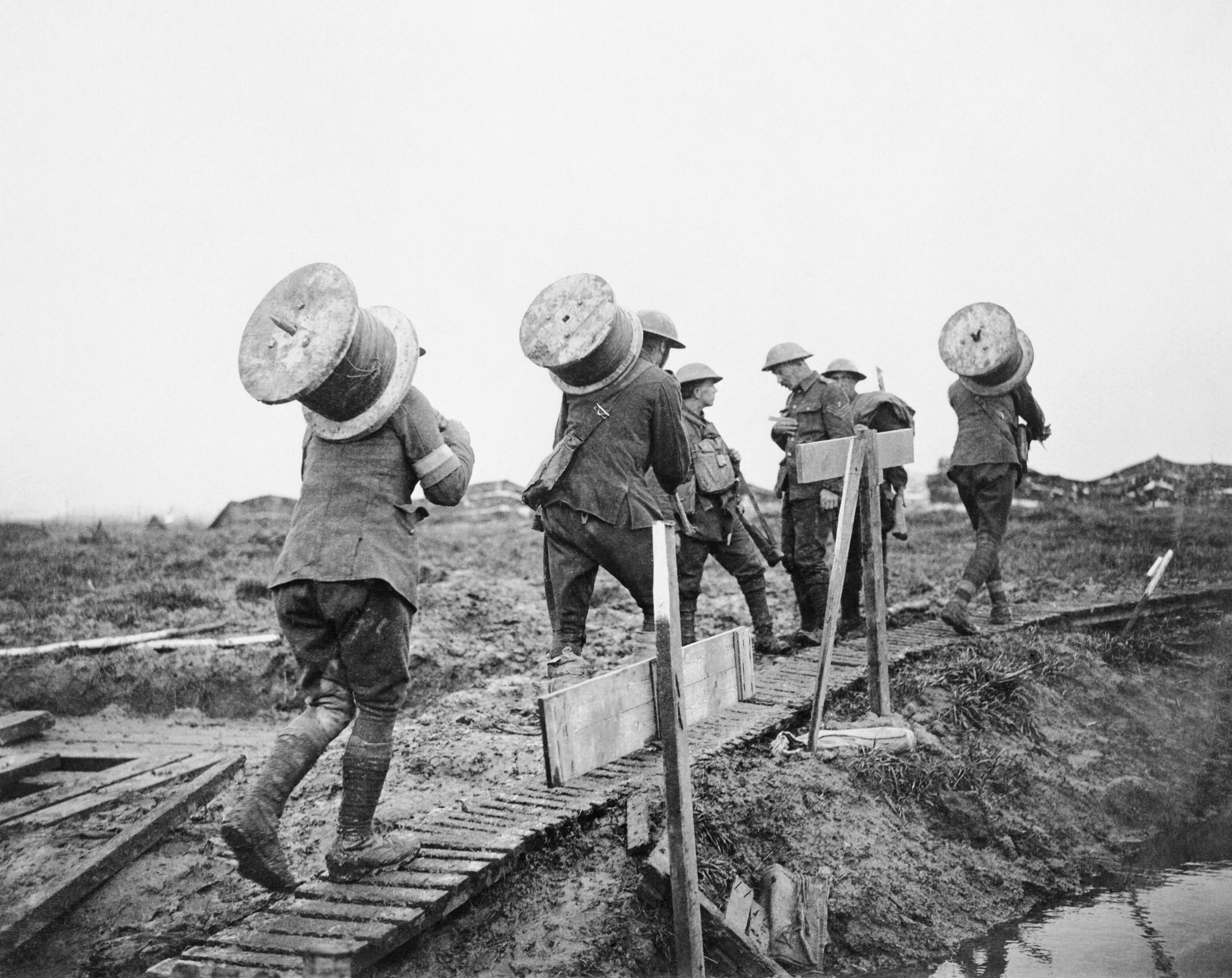
RE Signallers taking telephone wire up to the front line, Ypres Salient, October 1917.

=== 1917 ===
The 33rd Division was engaged at the Battle of Arras (1917), including the First and Second Battles of the Scarpe (14 and 23–23 April) and subsequent actions on the Hindenburg Line (20–30 May). During these operations the division suffered heavy casualties, including a number of RE officers. It was then transferred to the Flanders Coast where it took part in operations on 18–28 August.

33rd Division transferred to the Ypres sector in September, in time to take part in the Third Ypres Offensive. The division's preparations for the Battle of Polygon Wood were badly disrupted by a German surprise attack on 25 September, which caused heavy casualties and took many of the jumping-off positions. Nevertheless, the attack was reorganised overnight and went in on schedule the following morning, when 33rd Division took all its objectives.

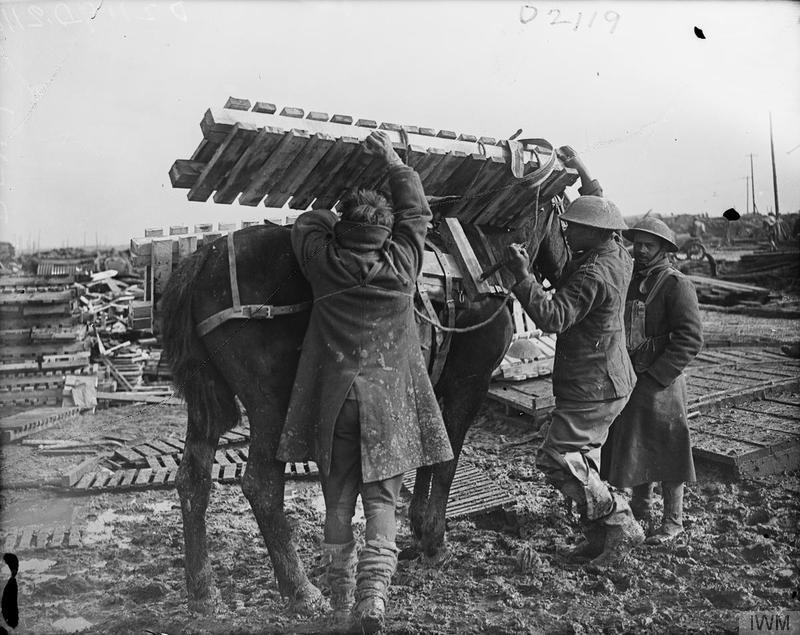
A packhorse being loaded with duckboards, Ypres Salient, October 1917.

The division then spent a terrible winter, doing tours of duty in the Passchendaele Salient. While the infantry attempted to make small gains, the engineers constructed concrete dugouts, underground galleries and drainage systems. Important achievements were the construction of a double duckboard track (the 'Mule Track') as far into the salient as Tyne Cot, and a Decauville narrow-gauge railway as far as Crest Farm.

=== German Spring Offensive ===
During the German spring offensive the division was engaged in a series of actions during the Battle of the Lys. It had been moved down from Ypres to the Arras sector and taken up positions at Méteren to plug a hole in the broken front. On 12 April 19th and 98th Brigades held the line, reinforced by RE signallers and any other troops who could be obtained, while a lorry toured the rear areas to find RE dumps of barbed wire to strengthen the defences. The German attack was renewed on 13 and 14 April, when the situation became critical, and the division had to withdraw to a new line. By the morning of 15 April new defences had been dug, which were defended during the next two days. At 17.00 on 16 April, the pioneer battalion (18th Middlesex) and 11th Field Company made a counter-attack through Méteren itself, taking prisoners and stabilising the position until French reinforcements arrived. Meanwhile, 100th Brigade had defended Neuve Eglise. The RE companies suffered heavy casualties in these actions.

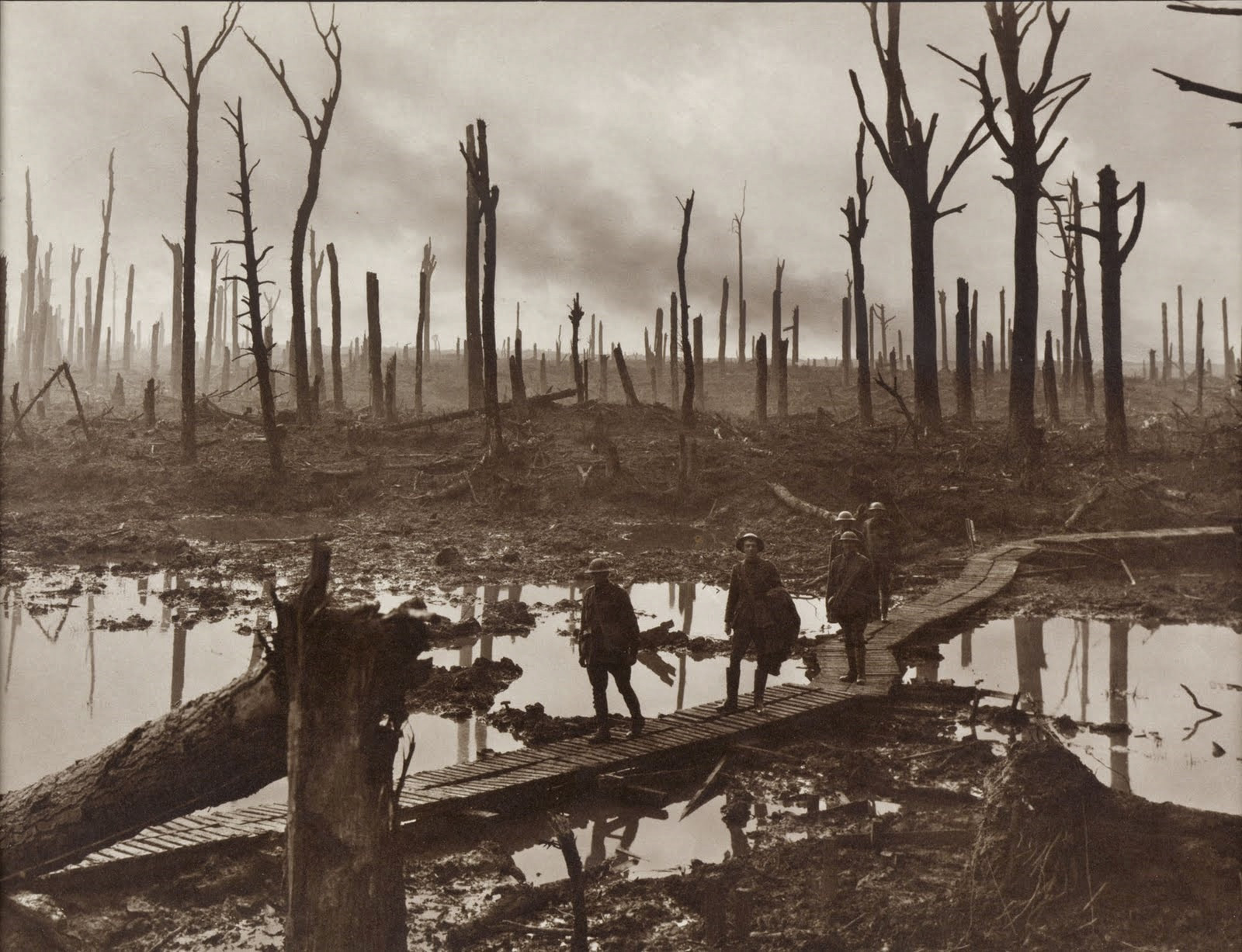
A duckboard track in the Ypres Salient, October 1917.

The division was relieved on 20 April. It went back into the line on 6 May near Dickebusch Lake in the Ypres sector, where the German offensive had been switched. The camps and rear areas of the Ypres Salient were quickly turned into strong defensive positions to hold this flank, but the division's infantry were engaged in bitter fighting to hold their positions on 8 May. Fighting went on into June, but the German offensive had been broken. The division remained in this area until late August, training newly arrived US troops.

=== Hundred Days Offensive ===
In September 33rd Division joined Third Amy's advance over the old Somme battlefields as part of the Hundred Days Offensive, lending support with artillery and machine guns. The roads, bridges and villages in the area had been thoroughly destroyed, leading to much work for the sappers. The division attacked at Villers-Guislain on 21 September at the Battle of Épehy, running into bitter defence by the enemy. Casualties from Mustard Gas were high, particularly among the signallers, and the attack was only partly successful. A second attempt by 33rd Division to take Villers-Guislain on 29 September as part of the Battle of St. Quentin Canal also brought heavy casualties, but the enemy later evacuated the positions following the Allied success elsewhere. Reconnaissance showed that the enemy had blown up all the bridges over the canal and were holding the far bank in strength. Patrols were prevented from crossing by machine gun fire, and attempts by the REs to repair the bridges and to form a cork floating bridge were hampered by snipers on the far bank, sometimes no more than 300 yards (270 m) away. However, on 4 October the RE constructed bridges and next day the division crossed in force and occupied the Hindenburg Line without heavy fighting.

The subsequent pursuit to the River Selle was led by 19th Bde, setting off from the Hindenburg Line at 02.00 on 9 October. It was accompanied as usual by 11th Field Company, and by detachments of artillery, cavalry and machine guns, and advanced rapidly. At Malincourt, a delayed-action mine exploded just before the brigade arrived, blocking the road and delaying the transport and guns. While the sappers cleared the way, the infantry pushed on, clearing a succession of villages as far as Bertry. The brigade made an advance of seven and a half miles in a few hours. Next day 98th Bde took over, following a cavalry screen, meeting stronger opposition but driving the enemy back across the Selle by the end of the day. During the night of 11/12 October, 11th and 212th (Tottenham) Field Companies, under the CRE, brought down their pontoon wagons and built 12 footbridges (two for pack horses) over the Selle, with little interference from the enemy and suffering only two casualties as the German machine-gun fire was high. The infantry crossed the bridges as soon as they were ready, and formed up on the eastern bank ready to assault at 05.00. However, a German counter-attack drove them back across the river by the end of the day and 100th Bde consolidated its position on the river with posts on the far bank to cover the bridges.

38th (Welsh) Division carried out a deliberate crossing of the river in the subsequent Battle of the Selle and then 33rd Division renewed the advance on 23 October, with the RE repairing bridges and roads as they went. In front of the Forest of Mormal 33rd Division attacked the village of Forest-en-Cambrésis by an enveloping movement. The Divisional Signal Company established four communication centres along the axis of advance, all linked by cable. However, the advance was held up before it could attain its final objective of Englefontaine. It achieved this on 26 October, and then 38th (W) Division relieved it that night, for the attack through the forest. All the engineers and pioneers were put to work repairing roads blocked by fallen trees and enemy demolitions. As 33rd Division assembled on 4 November for the Battle of the Sambre, 22nd and 212th Field Companies and 18th Middlesex were working to open the Route d'Hecq, with 11th Field Co working in Englefontaine. The signallers set up a report centre in Englefontaine with a link back to Divisional HQ. Early on 5 November the division completed the advance through the forest towards the River Sambre, with 212th and 222nd Field Companies attached to 98th and 100th Bdes to build bridges. That afternoon the leading battalions crossed the river and established bridgeheads. With continual rain and the roads badly blocked by guns and transport, the sappers could only get up enough material for a cork float footbridge for 110th Bde, but on 98th Bde's front 212th Field Company erected a pontoon bridge (with bad approaches) for wheeled traffic before nightfall, as well as a cork bridge and a footbridge across a demolished bridge made from planks salvaged from houses by the Middlesex pioneers. That night the sappers worked to double these bridges and 19th Bde followed 100th Bde across. Next day that brigade took up the pursuit accompanied by 11th Field Co. By the time the division was relieved on 7 November it was established on the Avesnes–Maubeuge road.

=== 226th (Tottenham) Field Company ===
This company served with 2nd Division on the Western Front throughout 1916–18. The division was in reserve on 21 May 1916 when the Germans launched a fierce counter-attack to recover captured positions on Vimy Ridge. 99th Brigade was sent up as reinforcements, and it was ordered to launch an attack at 20.25 on 23 May to regain the trenches that had been lost. The brigade had been heavily bombarded since 11.30 that morning, and its shallow jumping-off trenches had been obliterated. A company commander protested that it would be murder to proceed with the attack and it was called off, but the cancellation order did not reach B Company, 22nd (Kensington) Battalion Royal Fusiliers. Together with their attached section of 226 Field Company, 5 and 8 Platoons of B Company went 'over the top' as scheduled, into a storm of machine gun and shell fire. Although they succeeded in rushing the first trench and began consolidating their position, casualties had been extremely heavy. The Kensingtons' medical officer went out to call the survivors back, finding that the two platoons and sapper section had been 'wiped out'. 226 Field Company had lost 40 men during their week at Vimy.

Later on the Somme 2nd Division took part in the Battle of Delville Wood and other actions. It was engaged in a number of small actions in early 1917, followed by the Battle of Vimy Ridge and other actions during the Battle of Arras. It fought in the latter stages of the Battle of Cambrai, in the German Spring Offensive and the Allied Hundred Days Campaign culminating in the pursuit after the Battle of the Sambre.

=== 230th and 238th (Tottenham) Army Troops Companies ===
230th Army Troops Company served on the Western Front with First Army Troops RE from January 1916. By the Armistice it was with Fifth Army Troops RE, and remained with it until March 1919. 238th Army Troops Company also served on the Western Front with Fourth Army Troops RE from May 1916 to March 1919, including the Battle of the Somme.

== Commanding Royal Engineers ==
The following officers served as Commanding Royal Engineer (CRE) of 33rd Division:

- Lt-Col F.E.G. Skey, appointed 3 August 1915, sick 8 April 1916
- Capt W. Garforth, acting 8–24 April 1916
- Lt-Col F.M. Westropp, appointed 24 April 1916
- Lt-Col G.F. Evans, DSO, appointed 30 October 1916
- Lt-Col H.L. Bingay, appointed 22 November 1918

== Postwar ==
After pushing past the Sambre, 33rd Division was relieved and it was still resting in the Sambre valley when the Armistice with Germany came into force on 11 November. After the Armistice 222nd Field Co left 33rd Division and was converted into 222nd Army Troops (Works) Company, to work on reconstruction. It remained on the Continent until at least May 1919. Demobilisation of 33rd Division proceeded rapidly in 1919 and units dwindled to cadre strength before embarking for home. The division and its New Army units were formally disbanded on 30 June, while the Regular 11th Field Company returned to Aldershot Garrison in May. However, 33rd Divisional Signal Company, RE, appears to have continued as Third Army Area Signals in France and Flanders until October 1919.

The numbers 212, 222, 226, 230 and 238 were reassigned to existing Territorial Army field companies in the 1920s, and 33rd Division was never revived.

== Notes ==
- Maj A.F. Becke,History of the Great War: Order of Battle of Divisions, Part 1: The Regular British Divisions, London: HM Stationery Office, 1934/Uckfield: Naval & Military Press, 2007, ISBN 1-847347-38-X.
- Maj A.F. Becke,History of the Great War: Order of Battle of Divisions, Part 3a: New Army Divisions (9–26), London: HM Stationery Office, 1938/Uckfield: Naval & Military Press, 2007, ISBN 1-847347-41-X.
- Maj A.F. Becke,History of the Great War: Order of Battle of Divisions, Part 3b: New Army Divisions (30–41) and 63rd (R.N.) Division, London: HM Stationery Office, 1939/Uckfield: Naval & Military Press, 2007, ISBN 1-847347-41-X.
- Maj-Gen H.D. DePree, A History of the 38th (Welsh) and 33rd Divisions in the Last Five Weeks of the Great War (reprinted from Journal of the Royal Artillery, Vol LVIII, Nos 3 & 4, Vol LIX Nos 1, 2 & 3), Uckfield: Naval & Military Press, 2005, ISBN 978-1-84574-219-5.
- Brig-Gen Sir James E. Edmonds, History of the Great War: Military Operations, France and Belgium, 1916, Vol I, London: Macmillan,1932/Woking: Shearer, 1986, ISBN 0-946998-02-7.
- Brig-Gen Sir James E. Edmonds & Lt-Col R. Maxwell-Hyslop, History of the Great War: Military Operations, France and Belgium 1918, Vol V, 26th September–11th November, The Advance to Victory, London: HM Stationery Office, 1947/Imperial War Museum and Battery Press, 1993, ISBN 1-870423-06-2.
- Lt-Col Graham Seton-Hutchinson, The Thirty-Third Division in France and Flanders, 1915–1919, London: Waterlow & Sons 1921/Uckfield: Naval & Military Press, 2004, ISBN 978-1-84342-995-1.
- G.I.S. Inglis, The Kensington Battalion: Never Lost a Yard of Trench, Barnsley: Pen & Sword, 2010, ISBN 978-1-84884-247-2.
- John Lee, 'The British Divisions at Third Ypres', in Peter H. Liddle (ed), Passchendaele in Perspective: The Third Battle of Ypres, London: Leo Cooper, 1997, ISBN 0-85052-552-7.
- Cliff Lord & Graham Watson, Royal Corps of Signals: Unit Histories of the Corps (1920–2001) and its Antecedents, Solihull: Helion, 2003, ISBN 1-874622-92-2.
- Martin Middlebrook, The First Day on the Somme, 1 July 1916, London: Allen Lane 1971/Fontana, 1975.
- Instructions Issued by The War Office During July, 1915, London: HM Stationery Office, 1915.
- Instructions Issued by The War Office During November, 1915, London: HM Stationery Office, 1918.
- Graham E. Watson & Richard A. Rinaldi, The Corps of Royal Engineers: Organization and Units 1889–2018, Tiger Lily Books, 2018, ISBN 978-171790180-4.
- Leon Wolff, In Flanders Fields: The 1917 Campaign, London: Longmans, 1959/Corgi, 1966.

== External sources ==
- IWM Lives of the First World War
- My Eyes Have Seen the Glory (Spurs fansite)
