= Western Necropolis =

Victorian cemetery in Glasgow, Scotland

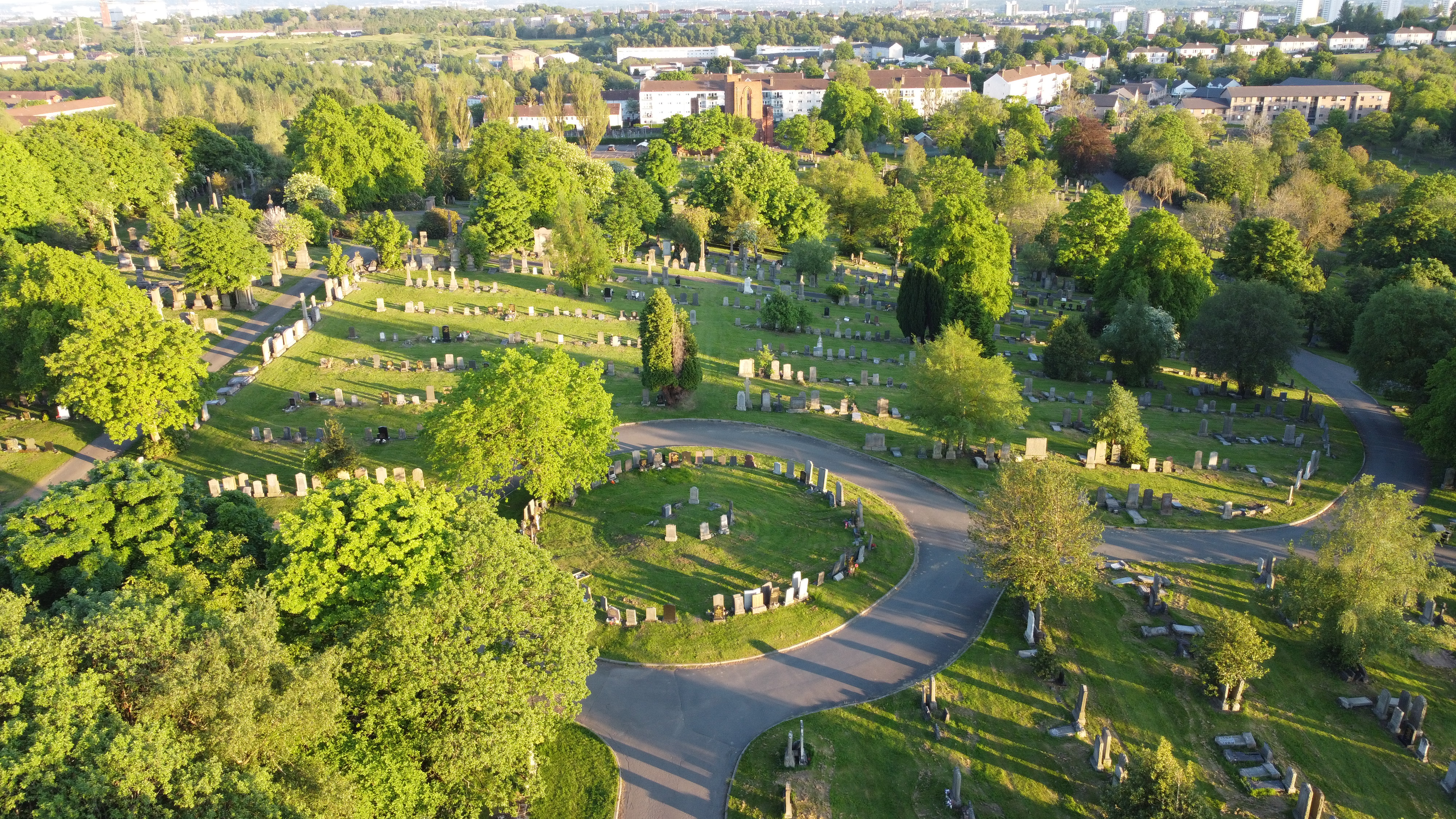
- Interactive map of Western Necropolis

Details
- Established: 1882
- Location: Glasgow
- Country: Scotland
- Coordinates: 55.89911°N 4.28173°W
- Type: Public
- Find a Grave: Western Necropolis

Western Necropolis is a cemetery complex in Glasgow, Scotland located to the north of the city centre. As well as the actual Western Necropolis cemetery established in 1882, it is bordered by Lambhill Cemetery which opened in 1881, St Kentigern's Cemetery (Roman Catholic) that opened in 1882, and Glasgow (Garnethill) Hebrew Burial Ground founded in 1989.

Of the four necropolises in Glasgow, the Western Necropolis is the only one with a crematorium on the grounds. Designed by James Chalmers in 1893 and opened in 1895, Glasgow Crematorium was the first crematorium in Scotland.

The cemetery contains 359 Commonwealth war graves from the First and 124 from Second World Wars, beside others from the Second Boer War, in addition to two German war graves. The First World War graves are mainly grouped in Section P, with a group of Australian graves in Section N.

== Notable burials in Western Necropolis ==
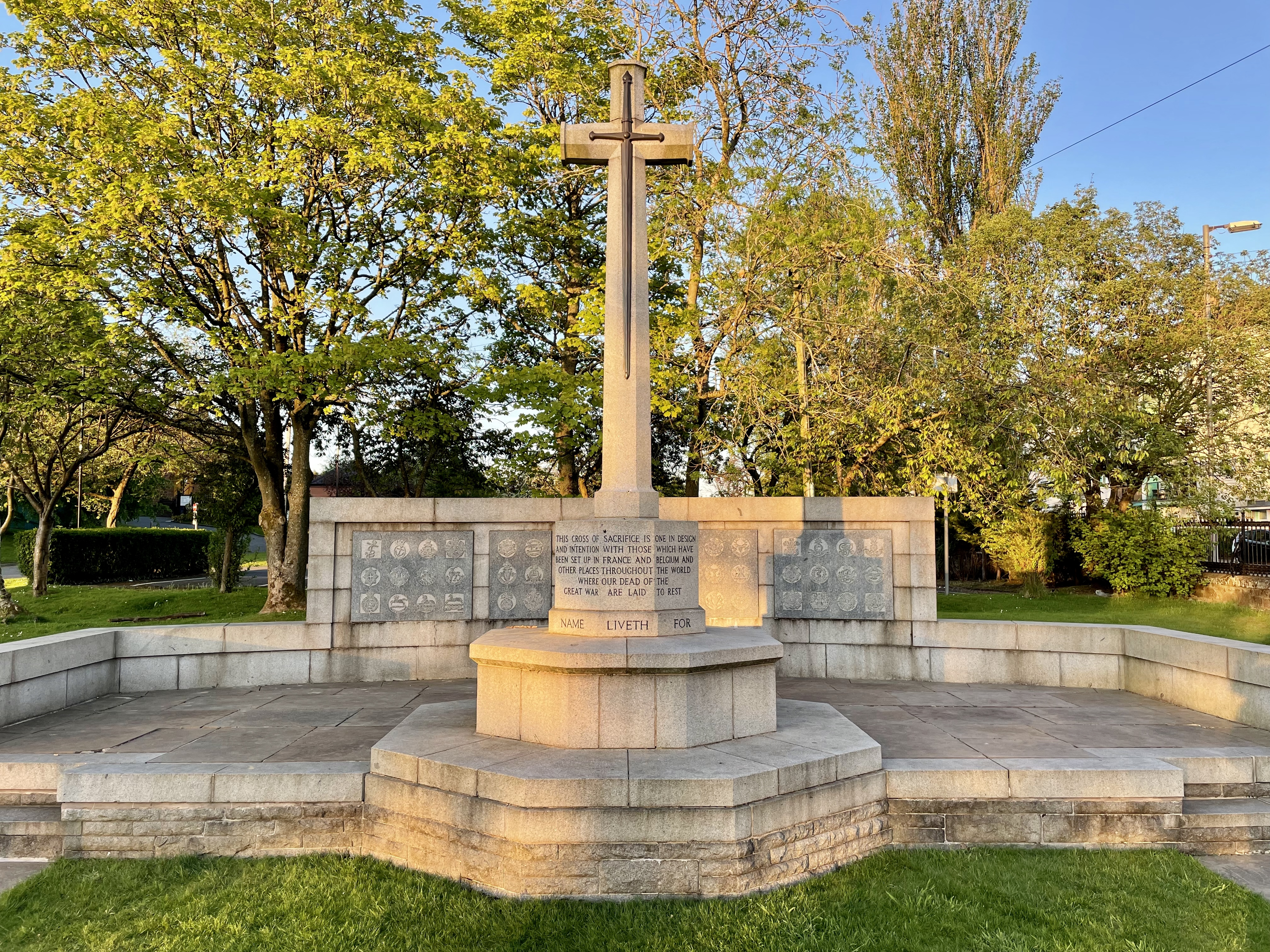
Cross of Sacrifice, Western Necropolis, Glasgow

- David Barclay (1846–1917) – architect
- Hugh Barclay (1829–1892) – architect
- James Thomson Bottomley (1845–1926) – physicist
- James Bridie (1888–1951) – playwright/screenwriter/physician
- John Burnet (1814–1901) – architect
- William Tennant Gairdner (1824 - 1907) - physician
- Henry MacDonald (1823–1893) – British Army officer, V.C. recipient
- Alexander Beith McDonald (1847–1915) – architect
- Willie Paul (1866-1911) - footballer
- William Shirreffs (1846–1902) – sculptor
- William Alexander Smith (1854–1914) – Boy's Brigade founder
- Alexander Neill Somerville (1813–1889) – minister/evangelist
- Four unidentified victims of the 1915 Quintinshill rail disaster

== Notable burials in Lambhill Cemetery ==
- Will Fyffe (1885–1947) – actor/singer
- James Sellars (1843–1888) – architect
- Findlay Weir (1889–1918) – footballer, died while serving in World War I

== Notable burials at St Kentigern’s Cemetery ==
- Robert Downie (1894–1968) – British Army soldier, V.C. recipient
- Francis Fitzpatrick (1859–1933) – British Army soldier, V.C. recipient
- Benny Lynch (1913–1946) – boxer

== Notable cremations at Glasgow Crematorium ==
- Major-General Sir Robert Bellew Adams (1856–1928) – British Army officer, V.C. recipient (ashes buried at Inverness)
- Guy Aldred (1886–1963) – English anarchist-communist (following leaving of his body to medical science).
- Harold Bride (1890–1956) – wireless officer on the ocean liner RMS Titanic during her ill-fated maiden voyage.
- James Finlayson (1840-1906) - Surgeon
- Maria Fyfe (1938–2020) – Member of Parliament for Glasgow Maryhill.
- John McFarlane Gray (1831–1908) - Engineer who invented a steam steering mechanism for Isambard Kingdom Brunel's famous SS Great Eastern.
- Keir Hardie (1856–1915) – founder Labour Party Leader
- Ninian MacWhannell (1860-1939) - architect, author and footballer.
- James Maxton (1885–1946) – Independent Labour Party leader and Member of Parliament for Glasgow Bridgeton.
- Jessie M. Soga (1870–1954) – singer/teacher/suffragette
- Sir Daniel Macaulay Stevenson (1851 – 1944), politician, businessman and philanthropist, and Chancellor of the University of Glasgow.

A memorial in the garden of rest erected by the Commonwealth War Graves Commission commemorates one serviceman of World War I and 72 Commonwealth service personnel of World War II who were cremated here.
