= James Finlayson =

James Finlayson may refer to:

- James Finlayson (minister) (1758–1808), of the Church of Scotland
- James Finlayson (industrialist) (1771–1852), Scottish Quaker who, in effect, took the Industrial Revolution to Tampere, Finland
- James Finlayson (actor) (1887–1953), Scottish actor
- James Finlayson (politician) (1823–1903), British Liberal Party politician
- James Finlayson (surgeon) (1840–1906), Scottish physician and writer
- James Finlayson (martyr), 16th-century Scot, one of the Perth Martyrs
- James Gordon Finlayson (born 1964), British philosopher
