= H & D Barclay =

Scottish architects

Hugh Barclay (1829–1892) and David Barclay FRIBA (1846–1917) were Scottish architects operating in the late 19th and early 20th centuries under the name of H & D Barclay. They specialised in the design of schools and colleges, but also did considerable municipal and church work.

== Hugh's Life ==
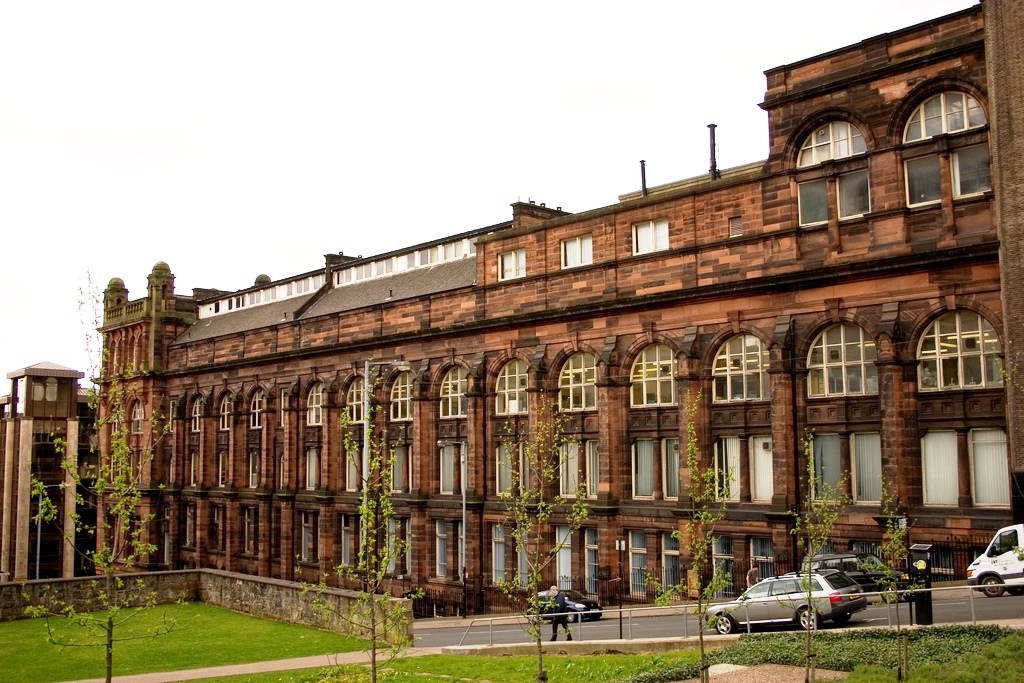
The Royal College Building, Glasgow

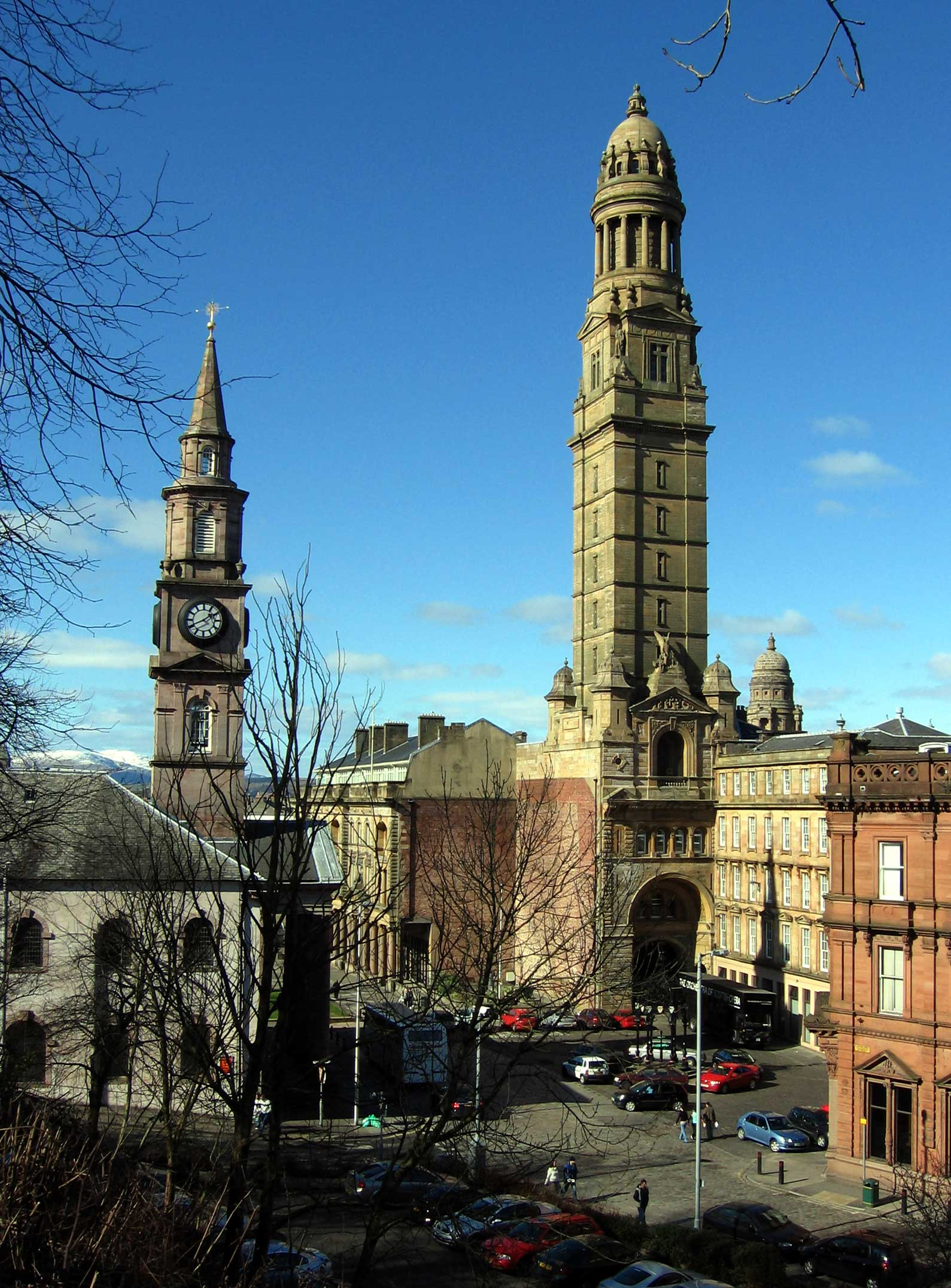
Greenock Municipal Buildings tower (right)

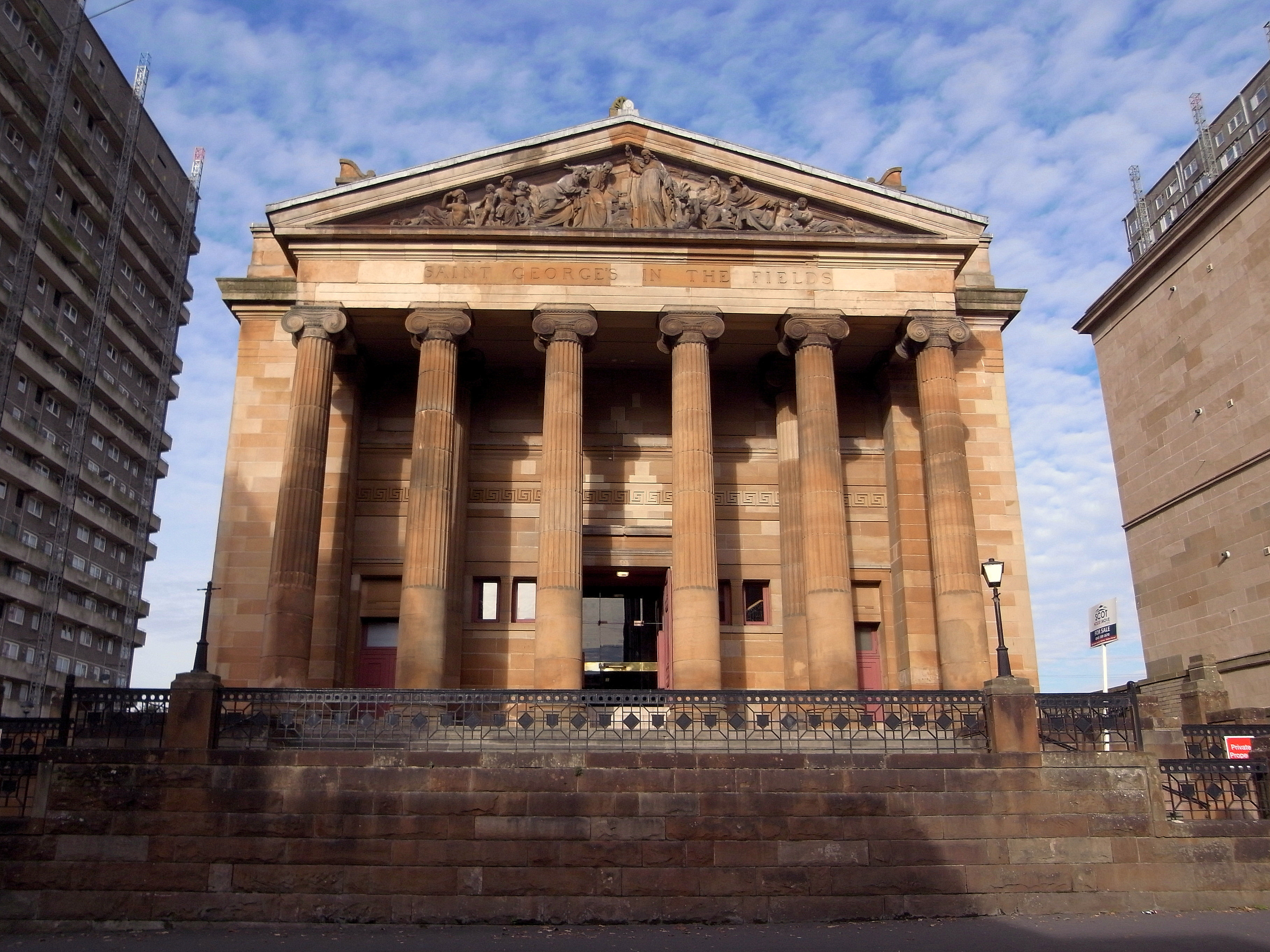
Glasgow. Woodside. St George's in the Fields

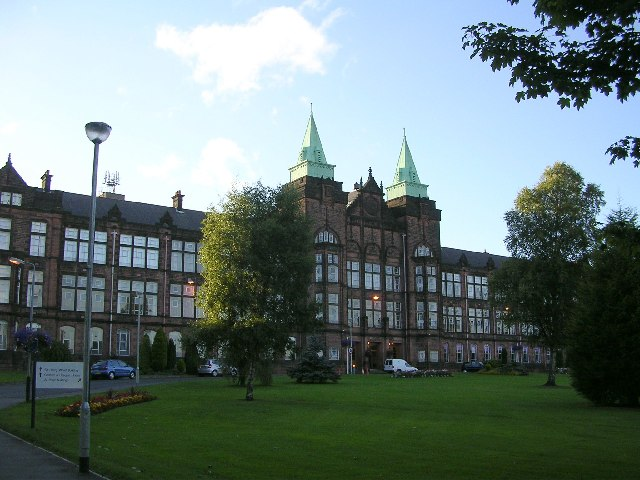
Jordanhill College

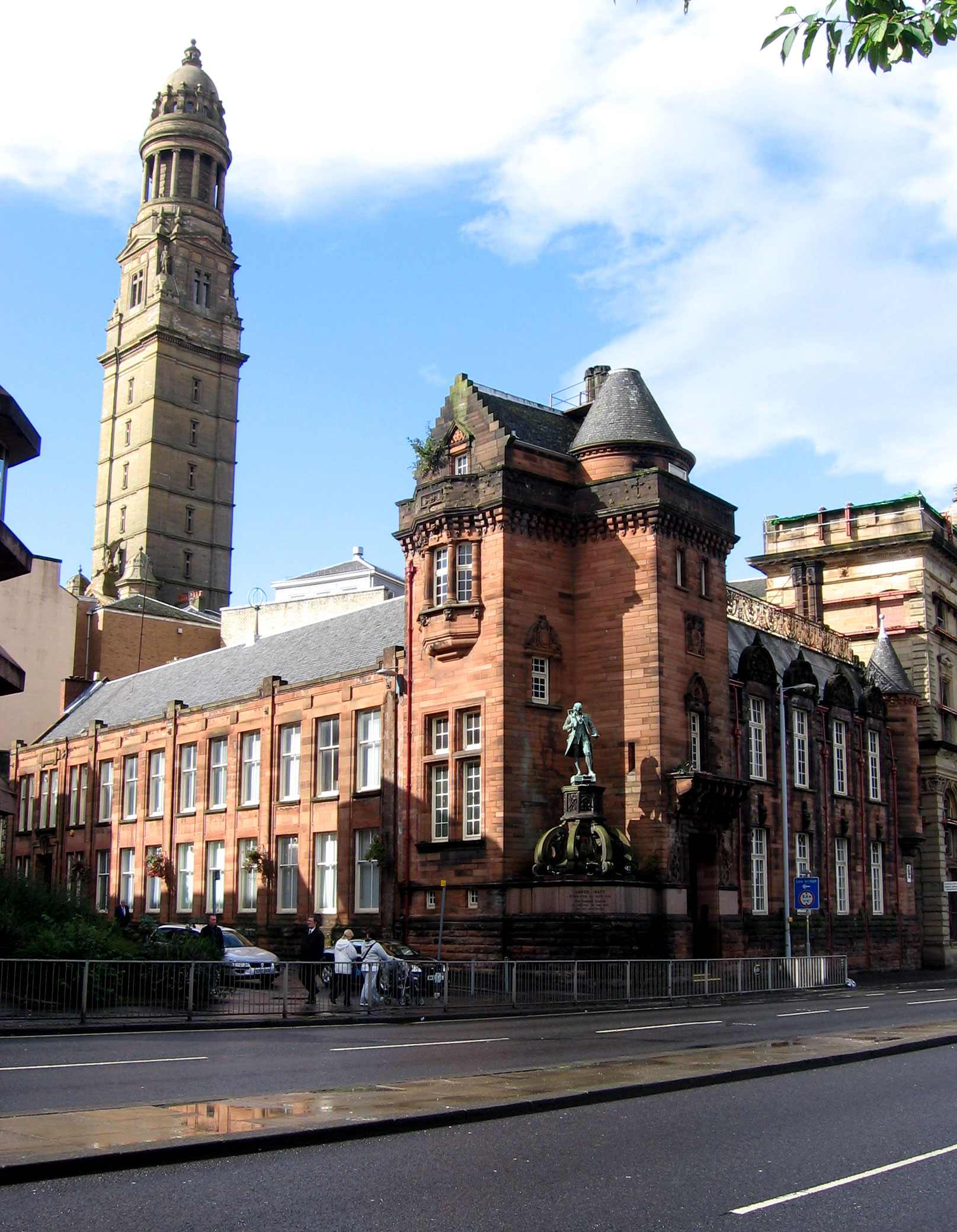
James Watt Memorial College

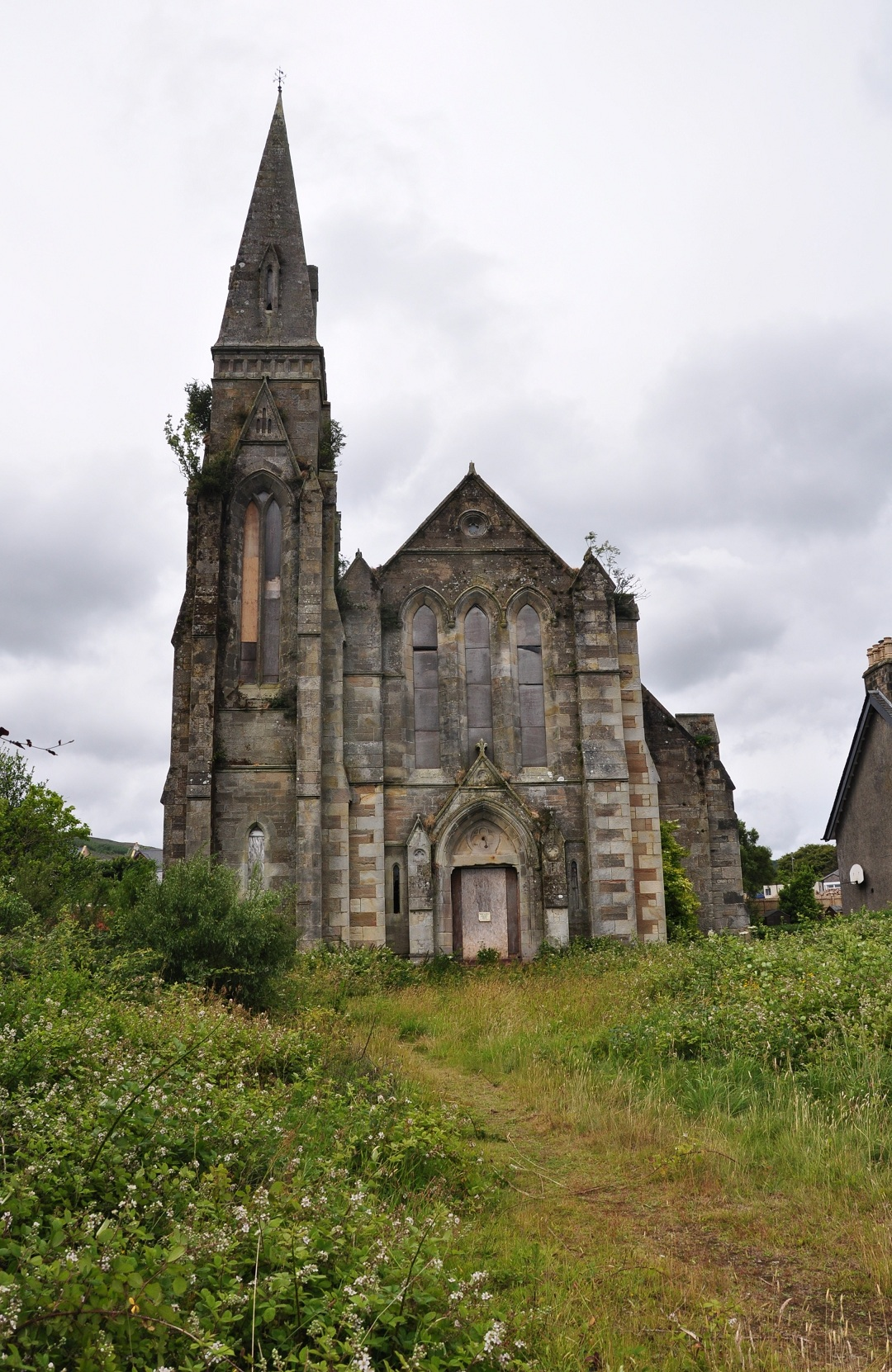
Lamlash church

He was born on 8 February 1829 in Kilmarnock the eldest son of Hugh Barclay, sculptor by his first wife. He trained as an architect under William Spence.

He was briefly in a partnership known as Barclay & Watt, but in 1871 he set up with his brother in partnership as H & D Barclay based at 112 West Regent Street in Glasgow city centre.

He died at home, 6 Buckingham Street in Glasgow, on 25 November 1892. He is buried in the Glasgow Western Necropolis. He was married to Helen Thomson and they had three children. The company name continued long after his death and did not expire until 1942.

== David's Life ==
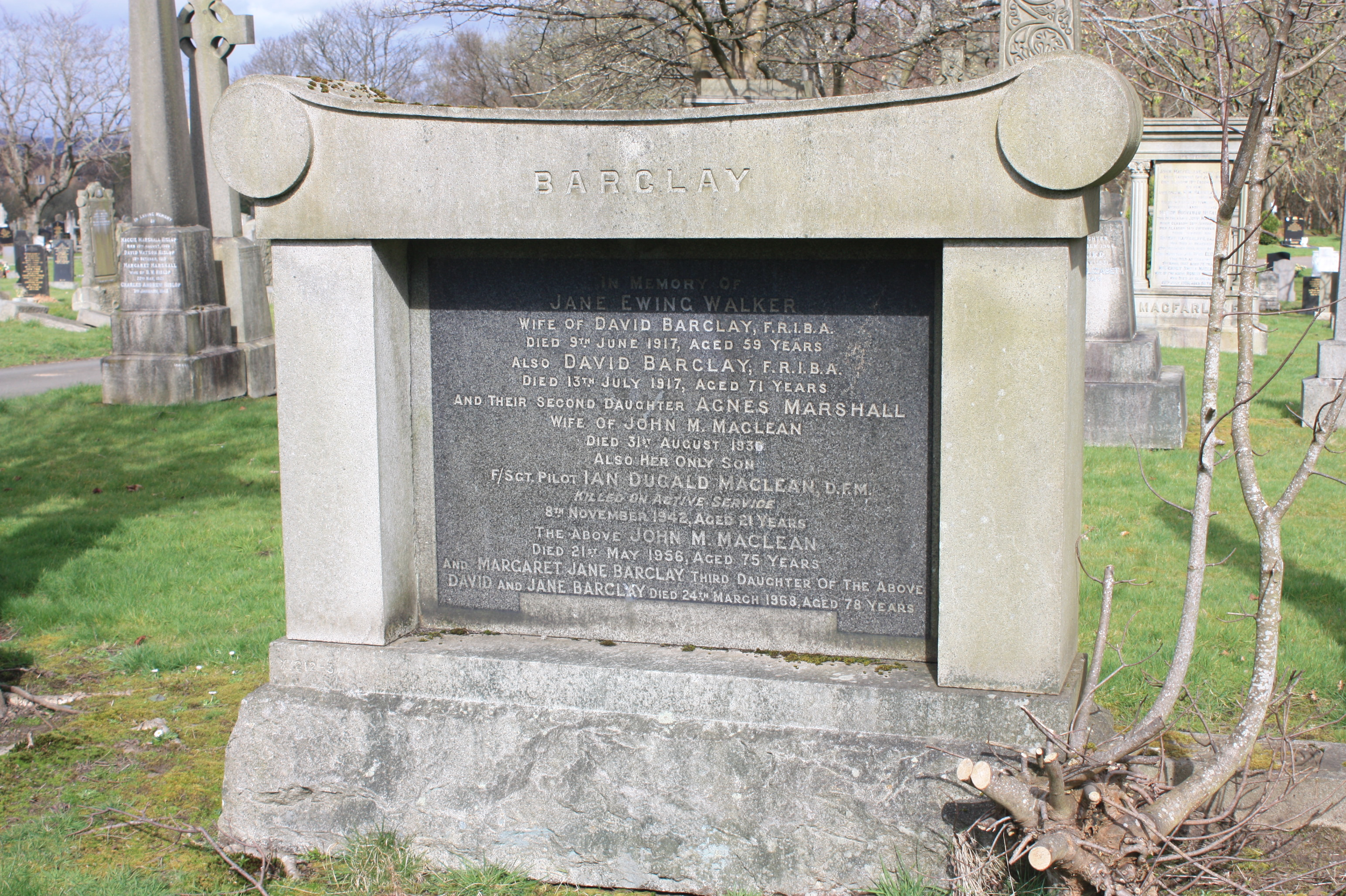
The grave of David Barclay, Western Necropolis, Glasgow

He was born in Glasgow the son of Hugh Barclay, sculptor, by his second wife. In early life his family lived at 45 Taylor Street.

In 1861, aged 14, he was article to his much older brother, Hugh Barclay, who was already an architect. The slightly older James Sellars trained alongside him. He was a Governor of the Glasgow School of Art and twice President of the Glasgow art Club.

He died at 437 Crow Road in Glasgow on 13 July 1917, aged 71. He is buried near the summit of the Western Necropolis in Glasgow.

=== Family ===
He was married to Jane Ewing Walker (1858–1917), eldest daughter of John E. Walker of Kelvinside. David Barclay died only a few days after his wife. They had three daughters and one son.

== Works ==
- Convalescent Home, Kilmun (1872)
- Duke Street UP Church, Glasgow (1872)
- Railwaymen's housing at Cowlairs (1872)
- Mission Sanitorium, Saltcoats (1873)
- Church at Ballantrae (1875)
- Albany Academy, Glasgow (1875)
- Glasgow Academy (1877)
- Partick Academy (1877)
- Regent Place UP Church, Dennistoun, Glasgow (1877)
- Abbotsford School, Glasgow (1878)
- Pollokshields School, Glasgow (1878)
- Greenock Municipal Buildings (1879)
- Polmadie Public School, Glasgow (1880)
- Albert Road Academy, Glasgow (1882)
- Govan High School (1883) and extension of 1901
- Rutland Crescent School, Glasgow (1883)
- Hillhead High School (1884)
- Jean Street School, Port Glasgow (1884)
- St George's-in-the-Fields Church, Glasgow (1885)
- Clune Park School, Port Glasgow (1886)
- Annette Street School, Govanhill (1886)
- Lamlash Church, Isle of Arran (1886)
- Queen Anne Board School, Dunfermline (1890)
- Stewartville School, Partick (1890)
- Cumming & Smith Warehouse, Sauchiehall Street, Glasgow (1891)
- Renton Parish Church (1891)
- Offices for J & P Coats, Glasgow (1891–1901)
- Lennoxtown School (1894)
- Mount Florida School, Glasgow (1895)
- Burgh Chambers, Millport, Cumbrae (1895)
- Finnieston School (1897)
- Miss Cranston’s Tearoom, Argylle Street, Glasgow (1897)
- Hunter Blair Warehouse, Glasgow (1899)
- Crieff Public School (1899)
- Empress Theatre, Partick (1900)
- Queens Park School, Glasgow (1900)
- St Leonards Primary School, Dunfermline (1900)
- Glasgow and West of Scotland College of Science and Technology (1901) known as Royal College Building, Strathclyde University
- James Watt Memorial School, Greenock (1908)
- Swedenborgian Church, Glasgow (1908)
- Dunfermline College of Physical Education (1909)
- Jordanhill College (1913)
