= James Findlay =

James Findlay may refer to:

== Politicians ==
- James Findlay (MP) (1833–1923), Canadian Member of Parliament
- James Findlay (British Columbia politician) (1854–1924), mayor of Vancouver
- James Findlay (Ohio politician) (1770–1835), mayor of Cincinnati; member of United States Congress

== Others ==
- James Findlay (swimmer) (1954–2015), Australian Olympic swimmer
- James Leslie Findlay (1868–1952), Scottish soldier and architect
- James Lloyd Findlay (1895–1983), Royal New Zealand Air Force officer

== See also ==
- James Finlay (disambiguation)
- James Finley (disambiguation)
- James Finlayson (disambiguation)
