= James Finley =

James Finley is the name of:

- James Finley (author) (born 1943), American author, psychologist, and teacher of Christian mysticism
- James Finley (minister) (1725–1795), American Presbyterian minister
- James Finley (engineer) (1756–1828), pioneer suspension bridge builder
- James I. Finley, American politician
- James Bradley Finley (1781–1856), American clergyman

== See also ==
- James Findlay (disambiguation)
- James Finley Watson, American judge and politician
