= James Finlay (rugby union, born 1887) =

Rugby union player from Northern Ireland

- Full name: James Ernest Finlay
- Born: 11 October 1887 Banbridge, County Down, Ireland
- Died: 6 April 1966 (aged 78) Honiton, Devon, England
- University: Queen's University Belfast

Rugby union career
- Position: Forward
International career
Years	Team	Apps	(Points)
1913–20	Ireland	6	(0)

James Ernest Finlay (11 October 1887 — 6 April 1966) was an Irish international rugby union player.

Finlay was born in Banbridge, County Down, and attended Queen's University Belfast, where he played varsity rugby.

A forward, Finlay was capped for Ireland both sides of World War I, with three appearances during the 1913 Five Nations, before gaining a further three caps on his return to the side in 1920.

Finlay subsequently moved to Devon and served 35 years as president of his local rugby club in Honiton.

== See also ==
- List of Ireland national rugby union players
