= James Finlayson (surgeon) =

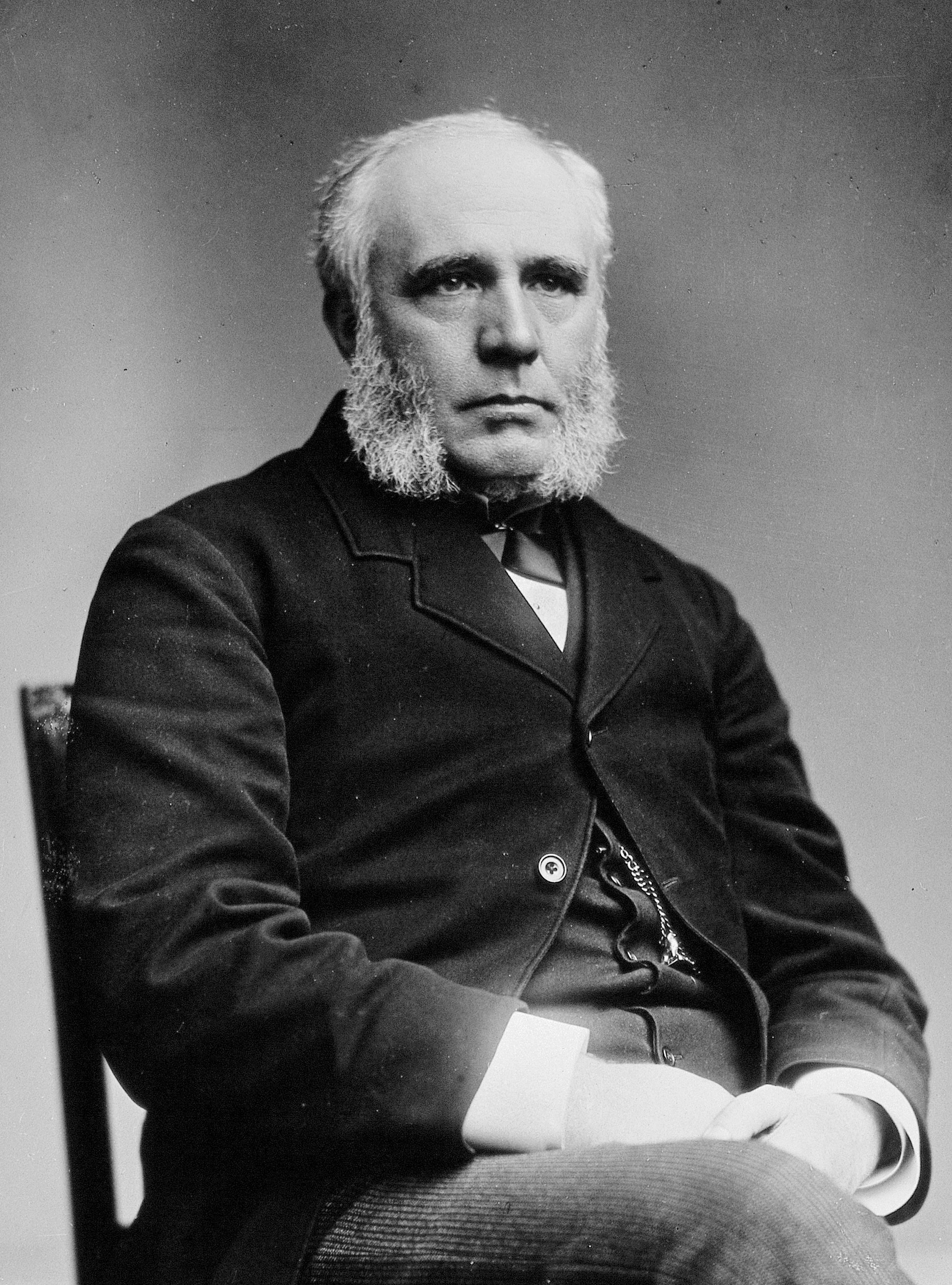
James Finlayson

James Finlayson (22 November 1840 – 9 October 1906) was a Scottish surgeon, physician, and prolific writer on medical and historical topics.

== Life ==
Born in Glasgow, Finlayson was third son and fourth child of the seven children of Thomas Finlayson, a manufacturer, and Georgina Campbell, the daughter of an army surgeon in India. His elder brother Thomas Campbell Finlayson was known as a congregational minister, first at the Congregational Church in Downing Place, Cambridge, and later at Rusholme, Manchester. James Finlayson received his early education at the Glasgow High School, and in 1856 entered the old college of Glasgow University in High Street as an arts student. From 1857 to 1862 he was in his father's business; but in 1863 he began the study of medicine, and graduated M.B. at Glasgow University with honours on 16 May 1867; he proceeded M.D. in 1869, and on 18 April 1899 was made hon. LL.D.

Finlayson was admitted a fellow of the Royal Faculty of Physicians and Surgeons of Glasgow in 1871, and was successively its honorary librarian (1877–1901), visitor (1899), and president (1900–3). After serving as house surgeon at the Children's Hospital, Manchester, he was assistant to Sir William Tennant Gairdner at the Glasgow Royal Infirmary, and in 1875 was elected physician to the Western Infirmary, Glasgow, where he was a recognised teacher until his death. He was also physician (1883–98) and later consulting physician to the Royal Hospital for Sick Children, Glasgow, and for many years was medical adviser to the Scottish Amicable Life Assurance Company. His own practice around Glasgow, was large.

Finlayson, who was unmarried, died suddenly from apoplexy on 9 October 1906 at his residence, 2 Woodside Place, Glasgow; his remains were cremated at the Western Necropolis. Friends endowed the Finlayson Memorial Lecture at the Royal Faculty of Physicians and Surgeons of Glasgow; the first lecture was delivered on 28 February 1908 by Norman Moore on the Schola Salernitana.

== Works ==
Finlayson's M.B. dissertation was titled The value of quantitative methods of investigation in medicine and allied sciences. He wrote on all aspects of medicine, including diseases of children, authoring 150 papers, 60 of which appeared in the Glasgow Medical Journal. He covered the history of medicine, and gave a number of lectures at Glasgow under the title of Bibliographical Demonstrations on Hippocrates, Galen, Herophilus, and Erasistratus (1893–5), the substance of which he contributed to Janus, an international medical journal. His major works were:

- Clinical Manual for the Examination of Medical Cases, 1878; 3rd edit. 1891.
- Account of the Life and Works of Maister Peter Lowe, the Founder of the Faculty of Physicians and Surgeons of Glasgow, 1889.
- An Account of the Life and Works of Dr. Robert Watt, Author of the "Bibliotheca Britannica", 1897.

To John Marie Keating's Cyclopædia of the Diseases of Children (1889) Finlayson contributed the article "Diagnosis".
