= Findlay Weir =

Scottish footballer

Personal information
- Full name: William Findlay Weir
- Date of birth: 18 April 1889
- Place of birth: Lenzie, Scotland
- Date of death: 9 July 1918 (aged 29)
- Place of death: Brighton, England
- Height: 5 ft 8 in (1.73 m)
- Position: Wing half

Senior career*
Years	Team	Apps	(Gls)
1904–1905	Campvale		
1905–1906	Waverley		
1906–1909	Maryhill		
1909–1911	The Wednesday	71	(1)
1912–1915	Tottenham Hotspur	96	(2)
- * Club domestic league appearances and goals

William Findlay Weir (18 April 1889 – 9 July 1918) was a Scottish professional footballer who played as a wing half for The Wednesday and Tottenham Hotspur in the Football League.

== Early life ==
Weir was born on 18 April 1889 in Lenzie, Dunbartonshire, the son of William and Mary Weir, his father was a dairyman. In 1901, Weir was described as an apprentice engine fitter.

== Career ==
A wing half, Weir began his career in Scottish junior football, before joining Maryhill in 1906. He moved to England to join First Division club The Wednesday in May 1909 and made 72 appearances, scoring one goal, before moving to fellow top-flight club Tottenham Hotspur in May 1912. Over the course of the following three seasons, Weir made 101 appearances and scored two goals before competitive football was suspended due to the outbreak of the First World War.

== Personal life ==
In early 1915, during the first year of the First World War, Weir enlisted as a sapper in the Royal Engineers and was posted to the Western Front in November that year. By January 1916, he had risen to the rank of sergeant and was wounded later that year. By mid-1918, Weir was based at Royal Engineers Demolition Training Depot in Newark-on-Trent. He died at 2nd Eastern General Hospital in Brighton on 9 July 1918 and was buried in Lambhill Cemetery, Glasgow.

== Career statistics ==
Appearances and goals by club, season and competition
Club	Season	League			National Cup		Total	
Club	Season	Division	Apps	Goals	Apps	Goals	Apps	Goals
The Wednesday	1909–10	First Division	11	0	0	0	11	0
The Wednesday	1910–11	First Division	36	1	1	0	37	1
The Wednesday	1911–12	First Division	24	0	0	0	24	0
The Wednesday	Total		71	1	1	0	72	1
Tottenham Hotspur	1912–13	First Division	34	1	3	0	37	1
Tottenham Hotspur	1913–14	First Division	33	0	0	0	33	0
Tottenham Hotspur	1914–15	First Division	29	1	2	0	31	1
Tottenham Hotspur	Total		96	2	5	0	101	2
Career total			167	3	6	0	173	3
